= General Suppression Headquarters of Xuzhou Garrison =

Chinese army

On June 29, 1948, the Xuzhou Command Headquarters of Republic of China Army reorganized as General Suppression Headquarters of Xuzhou Garrison (hereinafter referred to GHQ Xuzhou Garrison). Liu Zhi headed as the commander in chief, Du Yuming, Li Yannian, Feng Zhi'an, Liu Ruming, Han Deqin, Sun Zhen as Deputy Commanders in Chief, and Li Su-Cheng served as the Chief of Staff. In the beginning of the Hsuchow-Bengbu Campaign, the GHQ Xuzhou Garrison commanded, with six armies and three pacification zones under its operational jurisdiction, a total of about 800,000 ground troops. Xuzhou Garrison also owned a considerable number of elements of ROC Air Forces stationed in Nanjing, Xuzhou, and Bengbu: either under the direct command of GHQ Xuzhou Garrison, or controlled straight through the mobilization of the Air Force Command authority.

- The 2nd Army (commander: Qiu Qingquan)
- The 6th Army (commander: Li Yannian)
- The 7th Army (commander: Huang Baitao)
- The 13th Army (commander: Li Mi, deputy commander: Chen Bing)
- The 16th Army (commander: Sun Yuanliang)
- The 12th Army (Note: Reinforced from General Suppression Headquarters of Central China after the beginning of Hsuchow-Bengbu Campaign) (commander: Huang Wei, deputy commander: Hu Lien, Wu Shao-Chow)
- First pacification zone (commander: Chou Lei, deputy commander: Gu Xi-Ju, Li Tianxia)
- Third pacification zone (commander: Feng Zhi'an, deputy commander: Zhang Kexia, Ho Kei-Feng)
- Fourth pacification zone and The Eighth Army (commander: Liu Ruming, deputy commander: Cao Fulin, Mi Wen-Ho, and Tien Cheng-Nan)
- Hsuchow Garrison Command (commander: Li Yannian)

January 19, 1949, because of a devastated defeat of the nationalist forces resulted in "Xuzhou-Bengbu Campaign" (Huaihai Campaign), Suppression General Headquarters of Xuzhou Garrison was indefinitely deactivated.
