= Li Yannian =

Li Yannian may refer to:

- Li Yannian (musician) (died 82 BCE), Chinese musician during the Han dynasty
- Li Yannian (general) (1904–1974), Kuomintang lieutenant-general
- Li Yannian (PLA commissar) (born 1928), People's Liberation Army combat hero, former deputy political commissar of Unit 54251
