= Li Yannian (general) =

Chinese general (1904–1974)

Li Yannian 李延年
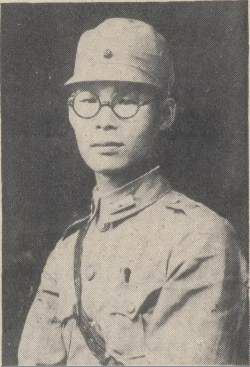
- Yannian in 1933
- Born: 11 March 1904; Le'an County (modern Guangrao County), Shandong
- Died: 17 November 1974 (aged 70) Taipei, Taiwan
- Allegiance: Republic of China
- Branch: (Republic of China (1912–1949)) National Revolutionary Army
- Service years: 1924–1949
- Rank: Lieutenant General
- Commands: 2nd corps, 6th army
- Conflicts: Northern Expedition; Second Sino-Japanese War; Chinese Civil War; Huaihai Campaign
- Awards: Order of Blue Sky and White Sun

Li Yannian (Chinese: 李延年; pinyin: Lǐ Yánnián; Wade–Giles: Li Yen-nien, 11 March 1904 – 17 November 1974) was a Kuomintang lieutenant-general from Shandong.

== Early life and career ==
General Li was a member of the first graduate class of the Whampoa Military Academy. His classmate was General Du Yuming. During the Northern Expedition, he was promoted from platoon leader to regimental colonel in the first corps of the National Revolutionary Army. When the NRA reorganized itself in 1928, he was named as deputy commander of the second Division, and in 1931 he was placed in charge of the garrison brigade of the NRA general headquarters and participated in the anti-communist Encirclement Campaigns.

== Second Sino-Japanese War ==
When the Second Sino-Japanese War broke out, General Li was promoted to commander of the second corps, he was one of the youngest corps commander of the entire NRA. He led his troops in the Battle of Shanghai and the Battle of Wuhan. He was then promoted to commander of the 11th army and commander-in-chief of 34th army group.

== Chinese Civil War ==
In June 1945, he was named deputy commander-in-chief of the 11th war zone and was in charge of the surrender of Imperial Japanese Army units in Shandong Province. In the Huaihai Campaign, he was named the commander of the 6th army, and he and General Liu Ruming's 8th army tried but failed relieved the 12th army led by General Huang Wei in the Shuangduiji Campaign. In the late phase of the Civil War, General Li was in charge of the defense of Fuzhou, Fujian when he believed a rumor spread by a local nationalist commander and abandoned his post without a fight. He was promptly arrested and because the false testimony provided by his chief of staff, he was sentenced to 10 years in prison. He received a parole a year later and died on 17 November 1974.
