= Qiu Qingquan =

Chinese general (1902–1949)

- 邱清泉
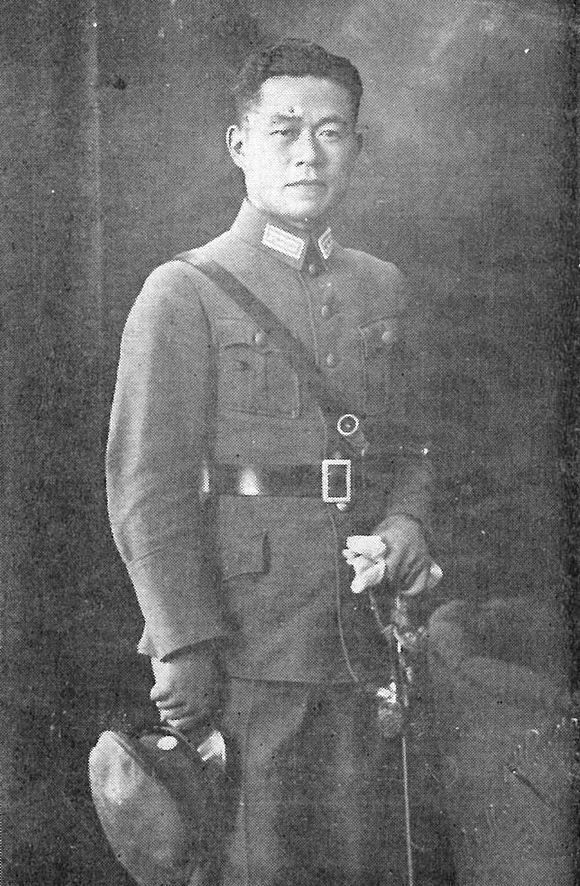
- Born: 27 January 1902; Yongjia County, Zhejiang, Qing China
- Died: 10 January 1949 (aged 46); Yongcheng, Henan, Republic of China
- Military career
- Allegiance: Republic of China
- Branch: (Republic of China (1912–1949)) Republic of China Army
- Service years: 1924–1949
- Rank: General (Posthumous)
- Nickname: Qiu the Madman
- Unit: 10th Division
- Commands: 5th Corps, 2nd Army
- Conflicts: Northern Expedition; Second Sino-Japanese War; Battle of Nanjing; Battle of Kunlun Pass; Chinese Civil War; Huaihai campaign
- Awards: Order of the Cloud and Banner; Order of the Precious Tripod; Order of Blue Sky and White Sun; Presidential Medal of Freedom

Qiu Qingquan (Chinese: 邱清泉; pinyin: Qiū Qīngquán; 27 January 1902 – 10 January 1949) was general of the Republic of China who served during the Northern Expedition, the Second Sino-Japanese War, and Chinese Civil War. In the Huaihai campaign, a major campaign of the Chinese Civil War, he failed to save General Huang Baitao's 7th corps, was encircled, and later committed suicide on the battlefield.

== Early life and career ==
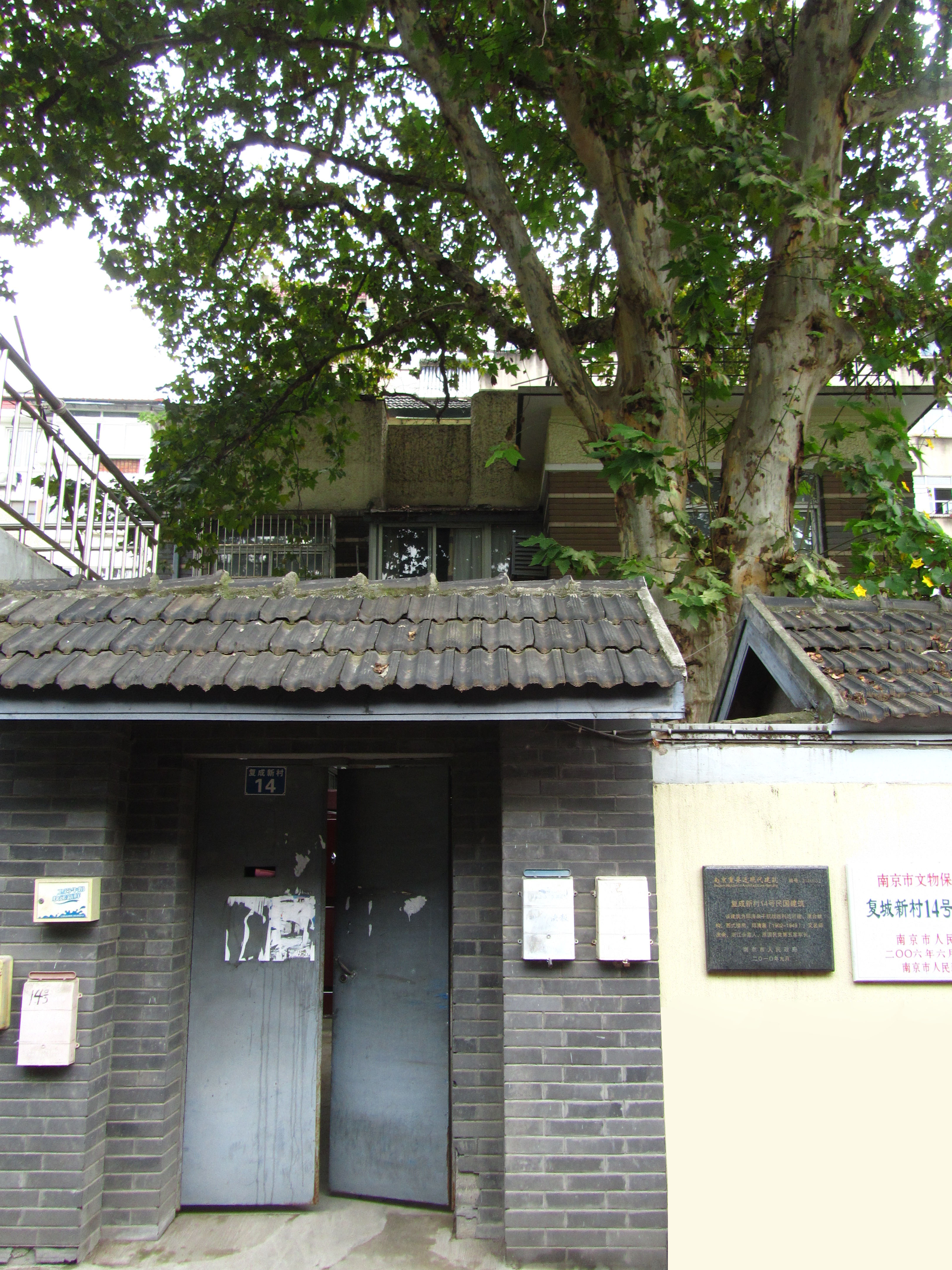
Former residence of Qiu Qingquan in Nanjing.

Qiu was born in a poor rural family in Zhejiang in 1902. In 1922, he enrolled at the University of Shanghai, majoring in sociology. In 1924, he went to Guangdong and was admitted into the Kuomintang's newly founded Whampoa Military Academy, majoring in military engineering. He served in a series of campaigns in which the Nationalist government became the dominant political authority in the Pearl River Delta. In 1926, Chiang Kai-shek became the commander-in-chief of the Kuomintang's National Revolutionary Army (NRA) and Qiu was promoted to captain. He served in the Northern Expedition, but when the right-wing elements of the Kuomintang purged the communists within its ranks, Qiu was arrested along with other Chiang protégés by the left-wing, Communist sympathetic government in Wuhan under Wang Jingwei. The group later escaped to Nanjing. Qiu was then promoted to the rank of major by Chiang. In 1928 he was promoted to lieutenant colonel and battalion commander, and participated in the Central Plains War against the rebelling warlords. In 1931 he was promoted to regimental colonel of the 10th division, and in 1933 he was promoted to major general. In 1934 he was sent to Germany to study tank warfare and became a student of Heinz Guderian in the Prussian Military Academy, when he returned to China he became a founding member of the NRA's armored troops, and was assigned as chief of staff of the Training Division, one of Chiang's elite units.

== Second Sino-Japanese War ==
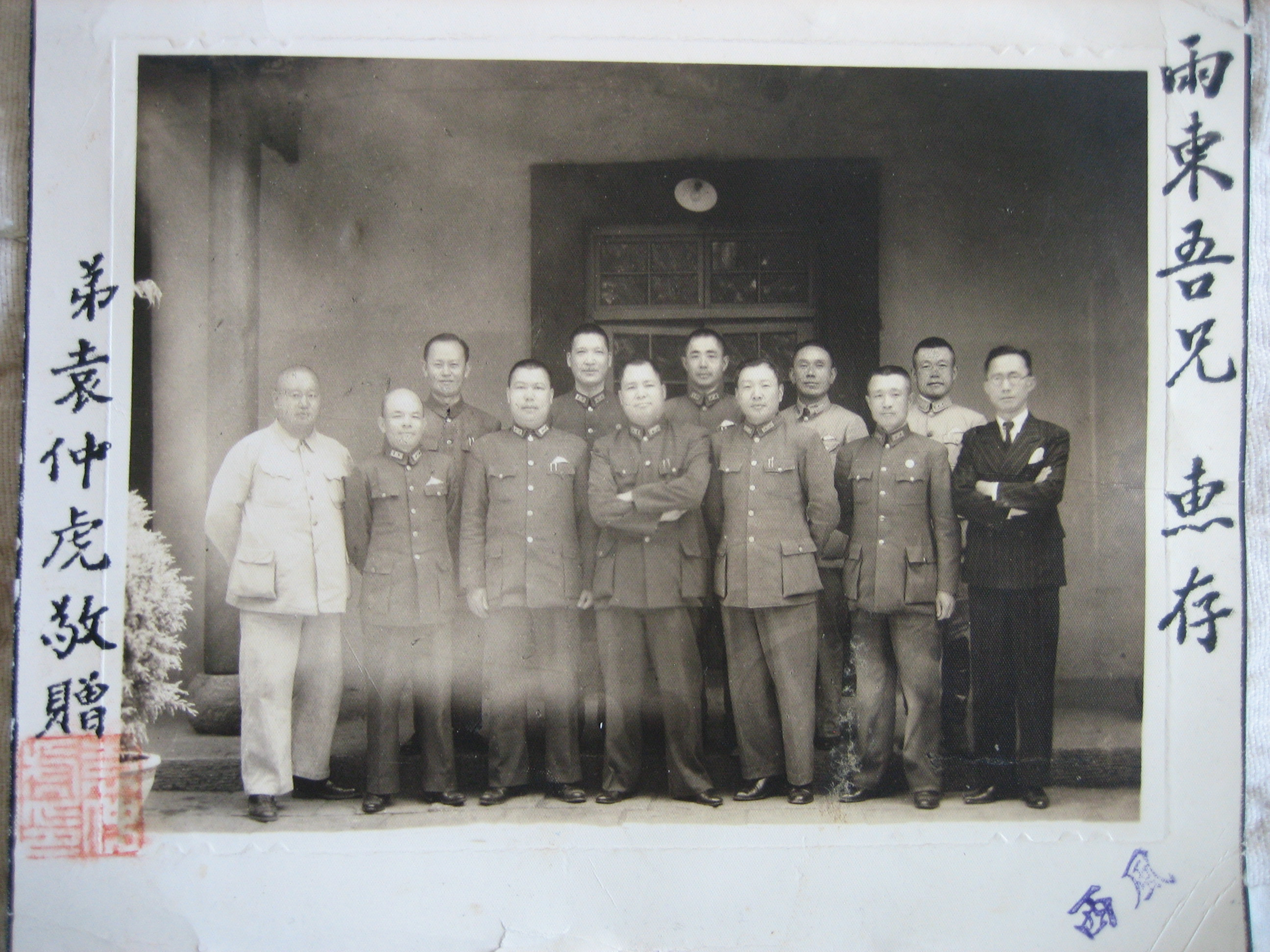
Nationalist generals in Yunnan, General Qiu is on the far right in the second row.

During the Battle of Nanjing Qiu was trapped within the city and conscripted by the Japanese forces a laborer. He managed to escape the following year and was appointed deputy commander of the elite 200th Division (National Revolutionary Army), China's only armoured division. In 1939, Qiu led the New 22nd division, (now part of the 5th corps) to in the Battle of Kunlun Pass. His troops cut off the Japanese retreat route and killed the Japanese commander, Major General Masao Nakamura. Qiu was awarded the Order of Precious Tripod and a promotion to deputy commander of the 5th corps; he earned his nickname Qiu the Mad from this battle. In 1942, after working as a staff officer for Chiang Kai-shek, he was promoted to lieutenant general, and became the commander of the 5th corps and participated a number of campaigns against the Imperial Japanese Army in Yunnan. The 5th corps became the garrison of Kunming in early 1945 until the end of the war with Japan.

Shortly after the end of the war, President Chiang Kai-shek decided to remove the local warlord Long Yun from power. Qiu and his old superior officer, General Du Yuming surrounded Long in his provincial headquarters in Kunming and forced him to resign.

== Chinese Civil War and death ==
In 1946, Qiu's unit was moved to Nanjing, and he participated in a series of military offensives that occupied most of the Communist-controlled area in central China. In 1948, he saved Huang Baitao's 25th army from Communist encirclement in eastern Henan. However, Qiu was not promoted or awarded for his actions while Huang was promoted to the command of the 7th army. The Communist moles inside the Nationalist high command, including the deputy chief of staff and director of the war planning board spread rumors that resulted in a complete breakup of any working relations between the two generals.

In November 1948, the Huaihai campaign broke out. However, because of intelligence leaks, Huang Baitao and his 7th army was besieged in Nianzhuang village, east of Xuzhou. Qiu's newly formed 2nd army and Li Mi's 13th army were tasked to relieve Huang's army. But after 11 days of fighting, Nationalist forces were unable to break the defense lines of the Communist forces. On 22 November, Huang committed suicide in his headquarters and the 7th army was defeated. The Nationalist high command ordered Xuzhou to be abandoned and the 2nd, 13th and 16th armies were to withdraw to the south of the Huai River, but their retreat route were blocked by massive numbers of refugees from Xuzhou. While en route to the Huai River, they received new orders from Chiang Kai-shek to move to the southeast to relieve Huang Wei's 12th army, but in turn they were surrounded by the Communists' Eastern China Field Army. After a month of siege, the Nationalist troops were unable to breakout on their own. Mao Zedong personally wrote to Qiu and Du Yuming with an opportunity to surrender, but Qiu firmly refused. Qiu led his army headquarters in an attempted breakout from the Communist encirclement on 10 January 1949, but after learning that a breakout was impossible, he committed suicide by shooting himself in the stomach. He was posthumously promoted to General and awarded the Order of Blue Sky and White Sun.

== Personal life ==
Qiu Qinguan married twice and had two sons and two daughters. His family later relocated to Taiwan.

Ching Chuan Kang Air Base in Taichung is named after Qiu.
