= Li Mi (Republic of China general) =

Chinese general (1902–1973)

Li Mi 李彌
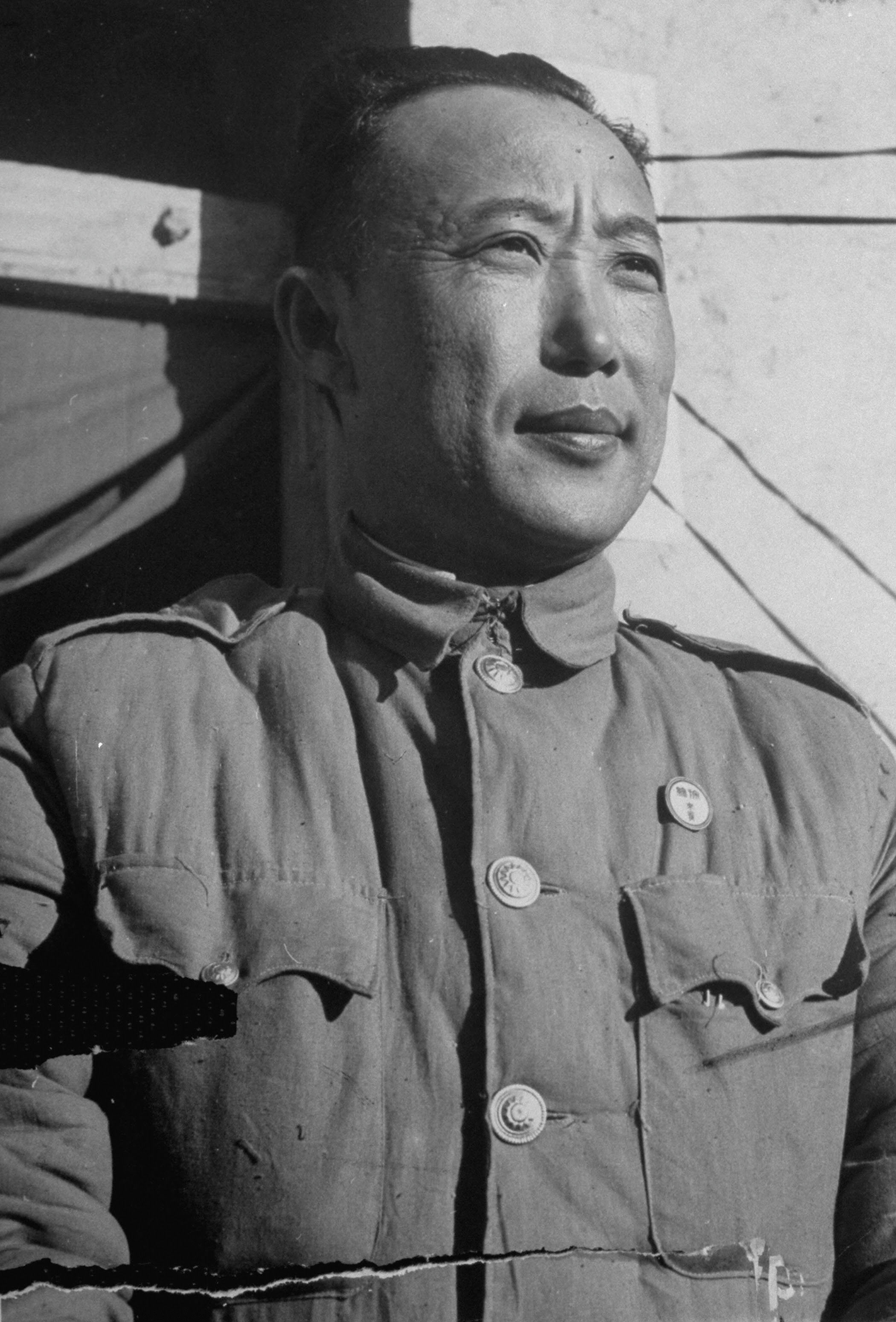
- Lieutenant General Li Mi in 1948
- Born: 21 November 1902; Tengchong County, Yunnan Province, China
- Died: 8 December 1973 (aged 71); Taipei, Taiwan
- Military career
- Allegiance: Republic of China
- Service years: 1927–1954
- Rank: Lieutenant General
- Unit: National Revolutionary Army
- Commands: 8th Corps, 13th Army
- Conflicts: Northern Expedition; Encirclement Campaigns; Second Sino-Japanese War; Battle of South Guangxi; Battle of Kunlun Pass; South-East Asian theatre of World War II; Burma campaign; Burma campaign; Battle of Northern Burma and Western Yunnan; Battle of Mount Song; Chinese Civil War; Nanma–Linqu Campaign; Huaihai Campaign; Landing Operation on Hainan Island; Kuomintang Islamic insurgency; 1960–61 campaign at the China–Burma border
- Awards: Order of Blue Sky and White Sun, Order of the Cloud and Banner
- Other work: Politician

Li Mi (Chinese: 李彌; pinyin: Lǐ Mí; 21 November 1902 – 8 December 1973) was a high-ranking Nationalist general who participated in the anti-Communist Encirclement Campaigns, Second Sino-Japanese War and Chinese Civil War. He was one of the few Kuomintang commanders to achieve notable victories against both Chinese Communist forces and the Imperial Japanese Army. Following the founding of the People's Republic of China in 1949, he withdrew his forces to Burma and Thailand, where he continued to carry out guerrilla raids into Communist-held territory.

== Early life and career ==
Li Mi was born in Tengchong County, Yunnan Province. He had a difficult childhood but his family managed to give him a modern education. In 1924, he went to Guangdong Province and entered the fourth class of the Whampoa Military Academy. He participated in the Northern Expedition with his classmates Hu Lien, Zhang Lingfu, Liu Yuzhang and Lin Biao. During the anti-Communist Encirclement Campaigns his superior commander, General Chen Cheng, accused him of harboring Communist sympathies and tried to take over his unit. Li Mi was able to prove his loyalty to Generalissimo Chiang Kai-shek and was named a county magistrate of one of the "red territories" the Kuomintang Nationalists had just taken over.

In the early 1930s Li joined General Xue Yue's staff, leading a crack Nationalist unit to drive the Communist forces out of the Jiangxi Soviet. Li then pursued the retreating Communist forces, chasing them over 1,000 miles, on foot, over the Long March. After the Communists had based themselves in northern China, Li devised battle plans which helped to defeat the famous Red Army commanders like He Long and Ye Ting, occupying of the territories the communists had previous controlled. By the outbreak of the Second Sino-Japanese War, Li had been promoted to colonel.

== Second Sino-Japanese War ==
When the war between China and Japan broke out, Chiang Kai-shek had Li Mi transferred to the regular army after rumors surfaced about his loyalty towards the KMT government. His corps commander saved him from certain arrest and execution by vouching for Li's loyalty. In 1940, Li Mi was promoted to command of the First Honor Division and fought against the Imperial Japanese Army in Central China, managing to destroy a Japanese airfield. In 1940 he participated the Battle of Kunlun Pass with General Du Yuming and General Qiu Qingquan and wiped out a Japanese brigade. In 1944 he joined the "Y-Force", commanded by General Wei Lihuang, in the Battle of Northern Burma and Western Yunnan, which destroyed the Japanese 55th and 56th divisions. By 1945, Li Mi was promoted to the rank of lieutenant general, and placed in command of the 8th Corps while retaining his command of the First Honor Division.

== Chinese Civil War ==
Under President Chiang Kai-shek's personal orders, Generals Li Mi, Du Yuming and Qiu Qingquan removed local warlord Long Yun of Yunnan Province from power in June 1945. American troops provided many supplies and provisions to Li's 8th corps, which proved invaluable in the coming struggle against the Chinese Communist forces. Until the outbreak of the 1948–1949 Huaihai Campaign, he was able to score a number of important victories against the Communists in Eastern China.

In November 1948, Li Mi, Sun Yuanliang and Qiu Qingquan were tasked to relieve General Huang Baitao's 7th army, but they were blocked by an enemy force. While attempting to assault enemy positions in Henan, he, Du Yuming, Sun Yuanliang and Qiu Qingquan became surrounded by PLA forces. Following this encirclement, Du was captured, Qiu committed suicide or was killed in action (actual cause unknown), and only Li was able to escape back to Nanjing (Another general, Sun Yuanliang, had escaped earlier).

President Chiang Kai-shek instructed him to rebuild his former 13th army and defend his home province, Yunnan, from Communist attacks. By the time that Communist forces had taken the mainland in 1949, Li had already withdrawn his armies south and west, into Thailand and the Shan states of Northern Burma. When Burma declared independence in 1948, Li established an independent Shan regime for his "Anti-Communist National Salvation Army". From these bases, Li's units continued to carry out guerrilla attacks against the Communist authorities in Yunnan.

Nationalist forces from Yunnan also attempted to move into French Indo-China, but these troops were quickly disarmed and arrested by the French. The troops which moved into Burma initially settled around Tachilek, in the state of Kengtung, near the Thai border. The troops who moved there under Li joined earlier Nationalist troops who had remained in the area after fighting the Japanese in World War II. Following Li's withdrawal to this region, Li reorganized all available Nationalist forces in the region, placing them under his command. Li's forces subsequently became known to foreign observers as the "93rd Division".

== Post-Civil War ==
Li's Kuomintang militants in Burma were partially supported secretly by weapons and other supplies and by CIA military advisors provided by the United States, but mostly supported itself through opium cultivation and distribution. At first, American strategists considered Li's "irregulars" useful to their regional efforts to contain communism; but, within a few years, Washington began to think of them as a threat to that same objective, and put serious pressure on Chiang Kai-shek to remove them. In 1953, 7,000 troops, including Li Mi, were airlifted to Taiwan, but many more troops decided to remain behind. 7,000 troops remained entrenched around the Burma-Laos border, while several thousand more remained in Thailand. By the time that a second withdrawal was announced, in 1961, American credibility, US-Burmese relations, and the effort to contain communism in the region were in serious disarray.

After achieving independence, the prime minister of Burma, U Nu, attempted to suppress Li's activities and ordered his forces to surrender, but Li refused. After the Burmese army attacked Li, he moved his troops to Mong Hsat. At the time, Burma was fighting four other insurgencies, including two communist guerrilla movements, and was not strong enough to seriously pursue Li's irregulars.

The CIA programme to aid Li's troops in Burma was called "Operation Paper". Operation Paper involved the use of Thailand as a transit route, transporting weapons and supplies between Taiwan and Burma. Once arriving in Thailand, these supplies would then be transported via air by CAT (Civil Air Transport), a CIA proprietary airline, under the command of General Chennault, working through two dummy corporations as diplomatic cover. The Thai prime minister at the time, Plaek Phibunsongkhram (also known as "Phibun"), agreed to aid Operation Paper, due to poor Thai-Burmese relations and the promise of American economic and military aid.

Between 1949 and 1953 Li's men impressed thousands of local tribesmen into joining them, and were reinforced with several hundred former army officers and trainers from Formosa. Refugees from communist-held Yunnan also joined his army. Many married local women, and they systematically "took over" the local opium trade. With the help of the Thai military, Li's army traded their opium through Thailand, exchanging it for weapons and supplies delivered from Taiwan. They made serious attempts to take control of Yunnan during this period, but did not achieve long-term success. At one point there were 20,000 pro-KMT soldiers attempting to recover Yunnan. The operation liberated four counties before their logistical network broke down, and Mi's forces were not able to achieve their goal.

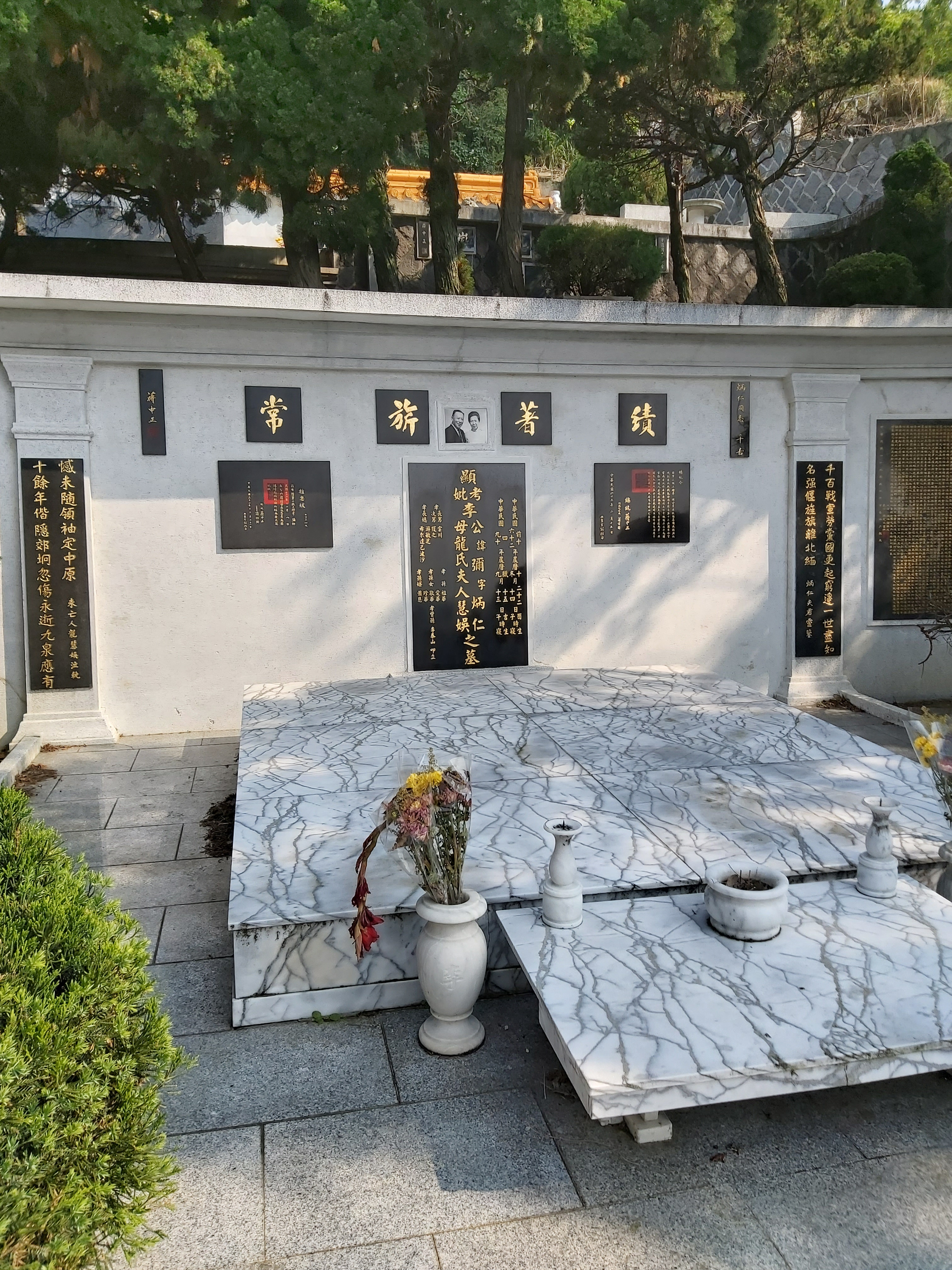
Grave of Li Mi in Yangmingshan Cemetery, Taipei.

There were several reasons for the American decision to put pressure on Chiang to remove Nationalist troops from Burma. An internal document investigating the usefulness of the Burmese Nationalist troops to the United States concluded that they were "of less military value to the free world as a support to regional defense than the regularly organized Burmese Army". Communist insurgents then present in Burma were known to cite the presence of Li's troops as their justification for being there. Additionally, if Rangoon were to devote their resources to defeating Li's troops, it would weaken their ability to defeat these other, communist guerrilla movements. The American secretary of state, John Foster Dulles, was concerned that the Burmese government might form a coalition with communist groups to remove Li's troops. There were also concerns that China might invade Burma in order to suppress them.

After returning to Taiwan in 1953, Li Mi retired from active military service, becoming a member of the Nationalist legislature and the party's central committee. He died in Taipei on 10 March 1973.

== Legacy ==
Following a partial withdrawal of troops to Taiwan, in 1960 the Burmese Army continued military efforts to remove them, possibly with the assistance from the PLA. By 1961, most remaining Nationalist forces had moved their bases inside Laos and Thailand, with the consent of those nations' governments and armies. Many were used by the governments of Thailand and Laos to combat anti-imperialist insurgents in their countries.

By 1967, Nationalist Chinese troops fought a war against a rival warlord, Khun Sa, for control of local opium production and distribution. They were quickly successful in the ensuing "Opium War", and continued to monopolize the local opium trade. Subsequent efforts by Chiang Kai-shek to reassert control over these troops failed, and they became effectively independent of Nationalist control.

In 1961, Li's former troops who had retreated into northwestern Thailand agreed to combat local Communist insurgents in exchange for official residence, as they had no legal status. Under the nominal command of the Thai army, the unit was renamed the "Chinese Irregular Forces" (CIF), and continued to grow and distribute opium in order to fund their anti-communist activities. In the late 1980s, the Thai government concluded that the CIF's anti-Communist activities had been successful, and they were granted Thai resident status. Their descendants mostly settled around village of Santikhiri.

== External References ==
- https://web.archive.org/web/20090326011824/http://cgsc.leavenworth.army.mil/carl/download/csipubs/bjorge_huai.pdf
- http://www.generals.dk.html
- Ministry of National Defense R.O.C
- US Naval War College
- https://web.archive.org/web/20090326011824/http://cgsc.leavenworth.army.mil/carl/download/csipubs/bjorge_huai.pdf
- Portrait of Li in 1948
