= Sun Yuanliang =

Chinese general (1904–2007)

Sun Yuanliang 孫元良
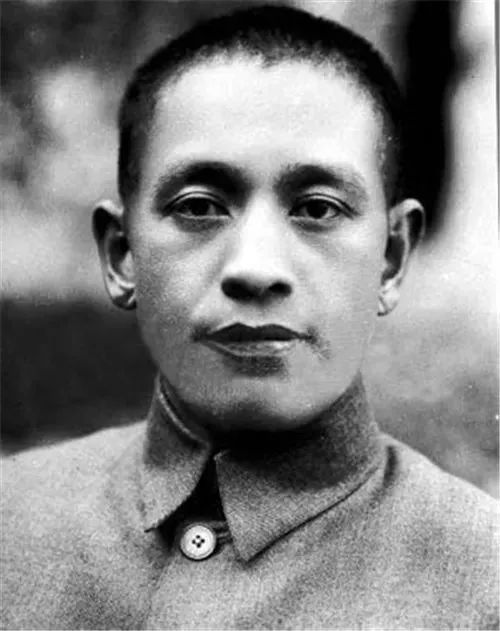
- Born: March 17, 1904; Chengdu, Sichuan Province, Qing dynasty
- Died: May 25, 2007 (aged 103); Taipei, Taiwan
- Children: Chin Han
- Military career
- Allegiance: Republic of China
- Branch: (Republic of China (1912–1949)) National Revolutionary Army
- Service years: 1924–1949
- Rank: General
- Nickname: The Flying General
- Unit: first corps
- Commands: 88th Division, 72nd Corps, 16th Army
- Conflicts: Northern Expedition, Second Sino-Japanese War, Huaihai Campaign
- Awards: Order of Blue Sky and White Sun
- Other work: general manager, author, entrepreneur, businessman

Sun Yuanliang (Chinese: 孫元良; pinyin: Sūn Yúanlíang; Wade–Giles: Sun Yüan-liang; March 17, 1904 – May 25, 2007) was a Chinese military general of the National Revolutionary Army of the Republic of China. Sun was the last surviving member of the first graduating class of the Whampoa Military Academy, as well as the last surviving nationalist army-level commander of the Second Sino-Japanese War. His career spanned the January 28 Incident, Second Sino-Japanese War and the Chinese Civil War.

His son Chin Han is an actor. He was the last living general of the World War II era.

== Early life and career ==
Sun was born in Chengdu, Sichuan in 1904. From 1922 to 1924, he studied in the University of Nanjing. He transferred to University of Beijing later. His uncle, Sun Zhen, helped him to secure an appointment in the newly formed Whampoa Military Academy. He performed well in the Northern Expedition and Chiang Kai-shek sent him to study in Japan. Sun attended the Imperial Military Academy in Japan and returned home in 1928. He was appointed as the first commander of the elite German trained 88th Division. In 1934, Sun and Tang Enbo succeed in surrounding the Jiangxi Soviet area and cut off communists retreat route to the south and he was promoted to lieutenant general.

== Second Sino-Japanese War ==
In the 1932 Japanese invasion of Shanghai, Sun led his division to defeat the Japanese at Miaohang (廟行鎮), in what the media billed as the first Chinese military victory over Japan. When full-scale war broke out between China and Japan in 1937, Sun led his 88th Division in the Battle of Shanghai. He personally gave the order to regimental commander Xie Jinyuan to hold onto the Sihang Warehouse at the conclusion of the three-month battle. During the Battle of Nanking in December 1937, he and his troops were surrounded by nearly a quarter million Japanese troops. Sun's superior, Tang Shengzhi, fled the city without giving his commanders any clear instructions on a possible breakout. Sun was forced to abandon his post during the ensuing chaos and escape from Nanking. Chiang Kai-shek reluctantly suspended him for two month and Sun did not receive another command until 1939. In 1944, the Imperial Japanese Army under Hata Shunroku launched Operation Ichi-Go, the largest military offensive against the nationalist government since the Battle of Wuhan, most of China's best troops were in Yunnan and Burma, and over half million Japanese soldiers attacked major railroad links and large cities, and the vanguard of the Japanese Eleventh Army were only 150 miles from Chongqing itself. Chiang Kai-shek dispatched nine hundred men of Sun's 29th corps to the south of Chungking and they drove away the two regiments of the Japanese 3rd Infantry Division despite complete numerical and technological inferiority. Sun was promoted to General and commander of the 16th army. Chiang personally bestowed the Order of Blue Sky and White Sun upon him.

== Chinese Civil War ==
After the war against Japan was over, Sun was named garrison commander of Chongqing and Nanjing, while keeping the command of the 16th army. He participated early successful campaigns against the Communist forces along with his old classmates, they were Du Yuming, Fan Hanjie, Hu Lien and Liu Yuzhang. The communists lost all of their holdings in Central and Eastern China except Shandong and Henan Provinces. In November 1948, the determining battle of the Chinese Civil War, the Huaihai Campaign broke out. Due to the poor leadership of Liu Zhi, one of the least effective Kuomintang commanders and major security breaches caused by Communist spies, Sun's troops were encircled by the communist Eastern China Field Army commanded by Su Yu. As a seasoned veteran, he urged Du Yuming, the deputy commander of the nationalist troops to break out before it is too late. Du, being a noted Chiang Kai-shek loyalist, decided to wait for reinforcement as Chiang had promised. Sun decided to breakout on his own, his 16th army was destroyed by the communist troops, but he made it safely to Nanjing in 1948. Chiang again appointed him as commander of the 16th army and tasked to reorganize his unit. In 1949, while he was defending Sichuan province from communist attack, many of his officers went to the communists. Sun was forced to resign as army commander and retired shortly after following Chiang Kai-shek to Taiwan.

His civilian life was quite successful and he ran a business in Taiwan.

Sun died at the age of 103 on May 25, 2007, in Taiwan.
