= Sun Zhen =

Chinese general (1892–1985)

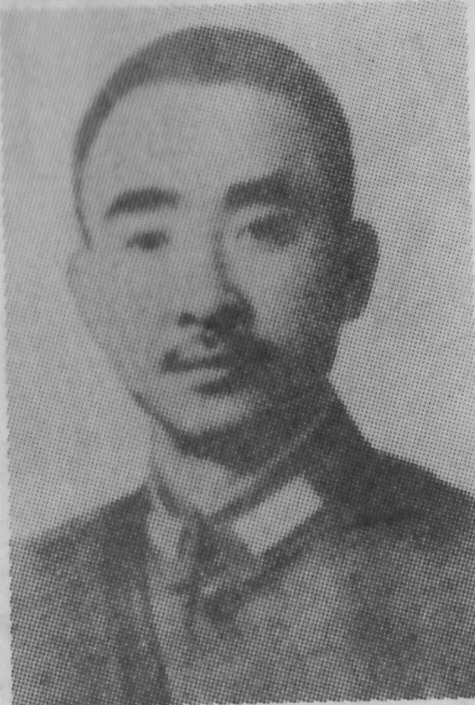
Sun Zhen

Sun Zhen (traditional Chinese: 孫震; simplified Chinese: 孙震; pinyin: Sūn Zhèn; Wade–Giles: Sun Chen; 5 February 1892 – 9 September 1985) was a general of the National Revolutionary Army during the Second Sino-Japanese War and Chinese Civil War.

== Biography ==
Sun was born in Sichuan in 1892. He joined the Tongmenghui in 1906 and entered the Baoding Military Academy in 1912. After graduating, he joined the anti-Yuan Shikai forces during the National Protection War. He joined the Kuomintang's National Revolutionary Army in 1926 and participated in the Northern Expedition. In 1933 Sun was made a general commanding the garrison of Sichuan's Northwestern District. He then participated in the suppression of the Chinese Communists in Sichuan and was promoted to lieutenant general in 1936. After the outbreak of the war with Japan, he was made acting commander-in-chief of the 22nd Army Group in 1938 and simultaneously held the command of the 41st Corps, which he retained until 1940. His command fought in the Battle of Xuzhou, defending to the north of Taierzhuang between Xuecheng and Tengxian, in Shandong.

In 1939 he became the commander-in-chief of 22nd Army Group which he commanded until 1945. His forces fought in the Battle of Suixian-Zaoyang, the 1939-40 Winter Offensive, the Battle of Zaoyang-Yichang, the Central Hubei Operation, and in 1945 he was commander-in-chief of the Western Henan Central Force during the Battle of West Henan-North Hubei.

During the Chinese Civil War in 1948, he was sent to participate in the Huaihai campaign, but his troops were mauled by the Communists and he was eventually given a position in Sichuan. As the Communists closed in on Sichuan in late 1949, he left for Taiwan. He retired in 1952 and died in Taipei on 9 September 1985 at the age of 93.

Sun Zhen was the uncle of fellow Nationalist general Sun Yuanliang.
