= Liu Zhi (ROC) =

Republic of China general (1892–1971)

- 劉峙
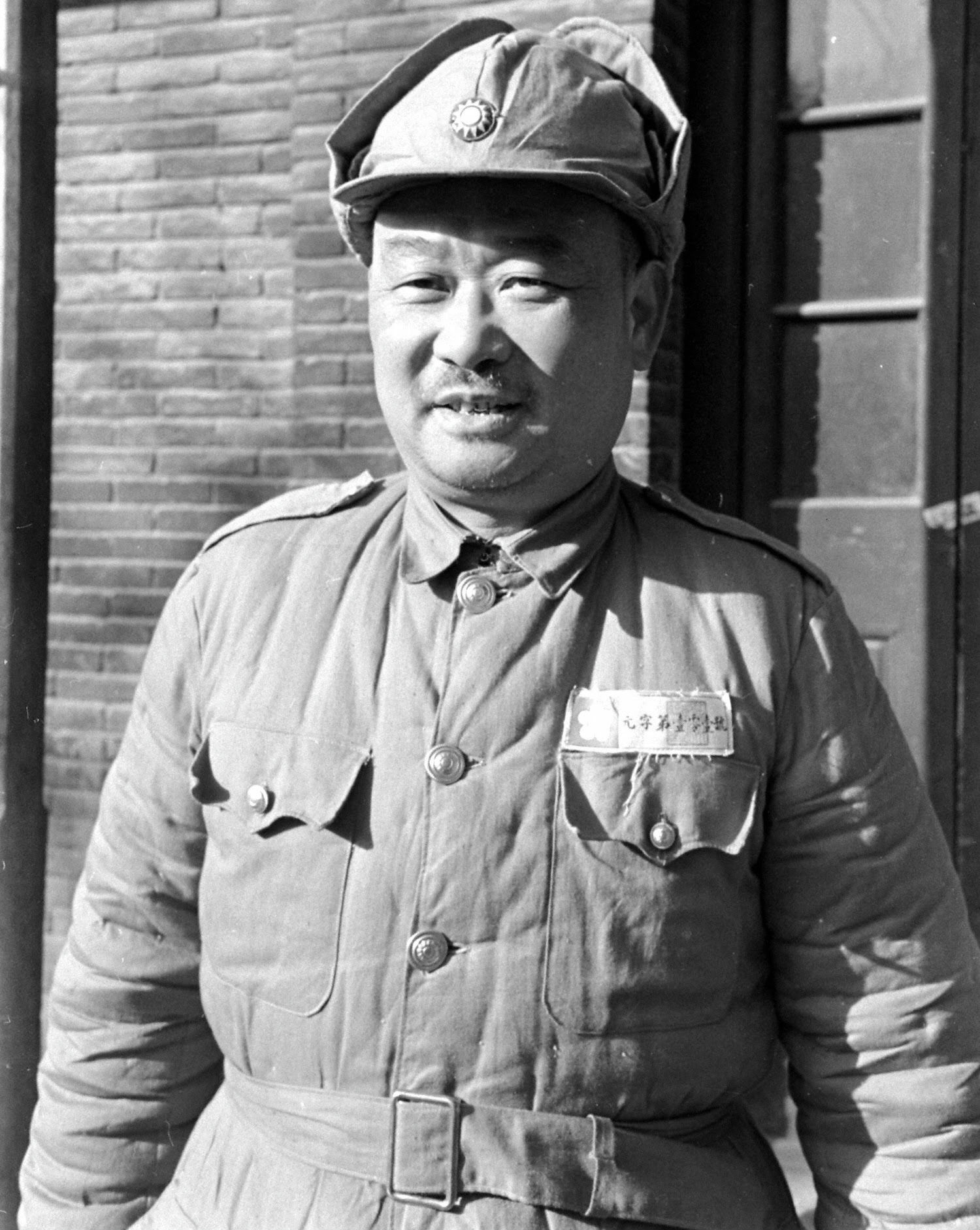
- Born: 30 June 1892; Ji'an, Jiangxi, Qing dynasty
- Died: 15 January 1971 (aged 78); Taichung, Taiwan
- Alma mater: Baoding Military Academy
- Military career
- Allegiance: Republic of China
- Branch: (Republic of China (1912–1949)) National Revolutionary Army
- Service years: 1914–1970
- Rank: General
- Nickname: The Long-Legged General
- Unit: First corps
- Commands: Suppression General Headquarter of Xuzhou Garrison
- Conflicts: Northern Expedition; Central Plains War; Second Sino-Japanese War; Bombing of Chongqing; Chinese Civil War; Campaign of the North China Plain Pocket; Huaihai Campaign
- Awards: Order of Blue Sky and White Sun
- Other work: Politician, Historian

Liu Zhi (Chinese: 劉峙; Wade–Giles: Liu Chih; 30 June 1892 – 15 January 1971) was a Chinese general and politician of the Republic of China from Jiangxi.

== Early life ==
Liu Zhi was born into a peasant family in Jiangxi on 30 June 1892. He attended private schools. His parents died when he was young and he was raised by his grandfather. He was educated in a local school before traveling to Japan to continue his education. When the Japanese government started to expel Chinese students at the request of the Qing dynasty government, he returned to China and enrolled in military academies in Wuhan. In 1914 he entered the Baoding Military Academy and after serving in numerous regional armies, Liu joined the faculty of the Whampoa Military Academy in 1924 and became a field commander during the Northern Expedition. He became friends with many important allies of Generalissimo Chiang Kai-shek, which helped him rise within the Kuomintang government.

== Career ==
He was instrumental in defeating the rebelling warlords in the Central Plains War and expanding Kuomintang military power throughout the 1930s by defeating the Chinese Communist forces in Henan. Chiang Kai-shek rewarded him by appointing him governor of Henan and naming a county after him. When the Second Sino-Japanese War broke out, Liu was named deputy commander of the First War Zone and commander-in-chief of the 2nd Army Group. By this time, he seemed to have gradually lost his military prowess, and the Imperial Japanese Army easily overwhelmed his forces and broke through the Chinese defensive lines despite being greatly outnumbered. Liu was forced to abandon much of Hebei in North China. This defeat contributed to the Chinese government decision to cause the 1938 Yellow River flood in order to slow down the Japanese advance, after which he was relieved from his posts by Chiang. When the Nationalist government retreated to Chongqing, Chiang named him as commander of the city's air defenses. When the Imperial Japanese Army Air Service began the Bombing of Chongqing, Liu's leadership was ineffective in stalling Japanese terror raids and raising civilian morale. He was dismissed again in 1942.

In February 1945 he became commander-in-chief of the fifth war zone, a post previously held by Li Zongren. When the war with Japan was over, he was named as pacification director of Zhengzhou garrison, controlling the first and fifth war zones. When the Campaign of the North China Plain Pocket broke out in the summer of 1946, he failed to destroy the Communist People's Liberation Army forces under Marshal Liu Bocheng and Deng Xiaoping and was relieved of his command again. In the fall of 1948, he became the commander-in-chief of the General Suppression Headquarters of Xuzhou Garrison and commanded some 800,000 nationalist soldiers. Liu's more capable deputy commander-in-chief Du Yuming was recalled to Manchuria to reinforce the Nationalist positions after the Liaoshen Campaign broke out on 12 September 1948. Liu went into a panic and did not organize an effective defensive line around his command sector when Communist forces under Su Yu attacked Xuzhou in the Huaihai Campaign. Although Chiang Kai-shek again dispatched Du Yuming to reinforce Liu, Liu's ineffective leadership and timidness had already doomed the Nationalist position in Central China. When the Communist forces finally defeated the Nationalist troops the next year and deputy commander-in-chief Du Yuming was captured, Liu was relieved by Chiang Kai-shek, who was fortunate to escape Xuzhou via plane.

== Later life ==
In 1950, Liu first moved to British Hong Kong, and later on made a living in Indonesia as a Chinese language teacher. In 1953, he was allowed to return to Taiwan and serve as a political adviser to Chiang Kai-shek. He was decorated with the Order of Blue Sky and White Sun. He died in Taichung on 15 January 1971.

== Evaluation and personal life ==
Liu Zhi's early military career was full of victories and successes, but he became a ineffective commander after the outbreak of the Second Sino-Japanese War. He was given opportunities in part because he was a staunch Chiang Kai-shek loyalist.

His granddaughter Jessamyn Liu graduated from West Point as valedictorian in 2006. Then U.S. President George W. Bush presented a diploma to her during the graduation ceremonies.

== See also ==
- Military history of the Republic of China
