= Order of the Sacred Tripod =

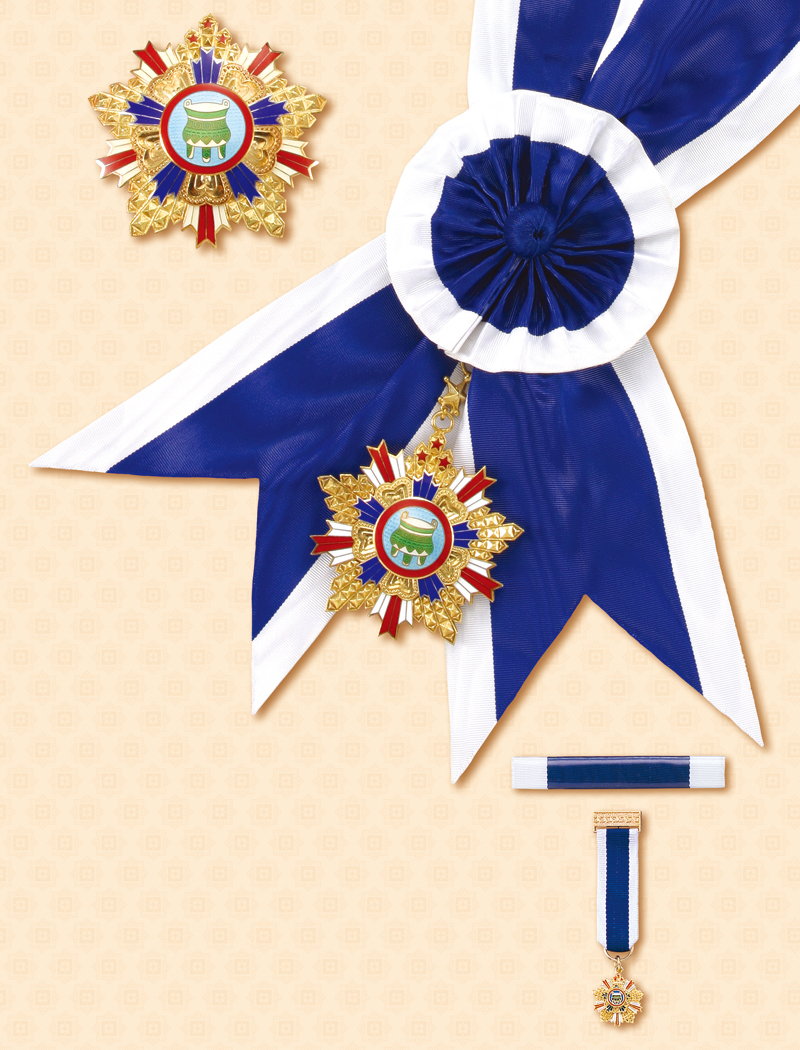
- Order of Sacred Tripod with Special Grand Cordon
- Awarded for: Significant contributions to national security
- Country: Republic of China
- Presented by: President of the Republic of China (Taiwan)
- Status: Currently awarded
- Established: 15 May 1929

Precedence
- Next (higher): Order of Blue Sky and White Sun
- Next (lower): Order of the Cloud and Banner

The Order of the Sacred Tripod (Chinese: 寶鼎勳章), also referred to as the Order of the Precious Tripod or Pao Ting, is a military award of the Republic of China. It was created on 15 May 1929 by Chiang Kai-shek for significant contributions to national security. The order is organized into nine grades. The central design of the order's insignia is an image of a tripod surrounded by golden rays. The symbolism of this is that as the tripod is considered a national treasure, so too is the recipient of the order.

== Grades ==
The order is divided into nine grades, they are as follows:

Grade	Name	Grade	Ribbon
1st	Order of the Sacred Tripod	with Special Grand Cordon	
2nd	Order of the Sacred Tripod	with Grand Cordon	
3rd	Order of the Sacred Tripod	with Red Grand Cordon	
4th	Order of the Sacred Tripod	with Special Cravat	
5th	Order of the Sacred Tripod	with Cravat	
6th	Order of the Sacred Tripod	with Special Rosette	
7th	Order of the Sacred Tripod	with Rosette	
8th	Order of the Sacred Tripod	with Special Ribbon	
9th	Order of the Sacred Tripod	with Ribbon	

== Notable recipients ==
- Chiang Kai-shek
- Gao Zhihang
- Charles D. Griffin
- William G. Farrow
- Bruce K. Holloway
- Huang Wei
- Ernest King
- Thomas C. Kinkaid
- Alexander von Falkenhausen (Special Grand Cordon, 28 November 1958)
- Douglas MacArthur
- Thomas Hinman Moorer
- Ng Yat Chung
- Chester W. Nimitz
- George H. Olmsted
- Alfred M. Pride
- Qiu Qingquan
- Bhim Shamsher Jang Bahadur Rana
- Padma Shamsher Jang Bahadur Rana
- Bertram J. Rodgers
- Alexander Vandegrift
- Hoyt Vandenberg
- Yan Xishan
- WWI Unknown Soldier (American)
- Zhang Lingfu
- Heng Hsieh
- Ma Bufang
