= Liu Ruming =

Chinese general (1895–1975)

Liu Ruming 劉汝明
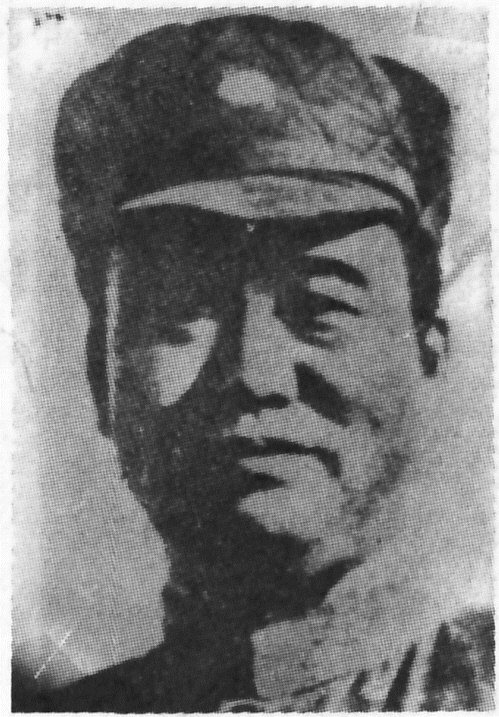
- Born: 12 May 1895; Xian County, Zhili, Qing China
- Died: 28 April 1975 (aged 79); Taipei, Taiwan
- Military career
- Allegiance: Republic of China
- Branch: (Republic of China (1912–1949)) National Revolutionary Army
- Service years: 1912–1952
- Rank: General
- Unit: Northwestern Army
- Commands: 68th Corps; 8th Army
- Conflicts: Northern Expedition; Central Plains War; Second Sino-Japanese War; Operation Chahar; Battle of Henan-Hunan-Guangxi; Chinese Civil War; Huaihai Campaign
- Awards: Order of Blue Sky and White Sun
- Other work: author

Liu Ruming (traditional Chinese: 劉汝明; simplified Chinese: 刘汝明; Wade–Giles: Liu Ju-ming; 12 May 1895 – 28 April 1975) was a general of the Republic of China during the Second Sino-Japanese War and the Chinese Civil War.

== Biography ==
Born in Hebei, he became an important military officer in Feng Yuxiang's Northwestern Army. He served during the Northern Expedition. After the 1930 Central Plains War he took the post of 29th Army Deputy commander. He became chairman of the government of Chahar Province in June 1936, holding it until October 1938.

In July 1937 he was commander of the 143rd Division, at the outbreak of the Second Sino-Japanese War. Later during Operation Chahar he commanded the defense of the provincial capital of Kalgan with the 7th Army Group Detachment as the Deputy commander of 7th Army in addition to command of his division. From then on he commanded the 68th Corps in the later phase of the Peiping – Hankow Railway Operation, and during many of the important battles in the war, the Battle of Xuzhou, Battle of Wuhan, Battle of Suixian-Zaoyang, Battle of Zaoyang-Yichang, Battle of South Henan.

During the Battle of Henan-Hunan-Guangxi, at the time of the Battle of West Henan-North Hubei in 1945 he was in command of the Western Henan Garrison and the Western Henan Forces, 2nd Army Group.

During the Chinese Civil War in 1948 Liu was in command of 8th Army in the Huaihai Campaign. His army tried but failed to relieve other trapped Nationalist forces in the battle. In 1949 Liu was given a command to defend Fujian, but his troops were defeated during the Battle of Xiamen and he took much of the blame for the defeat.

In 1949 he moved to Taiwan along with the Nationalist government. He retired in 1952 and died in Taipei on 28 April 1975 at the age of 79.
