= Huaihai campaign =

Battle of the Chinese Civil War (1948–49)

- Part of the Chinese Civil War
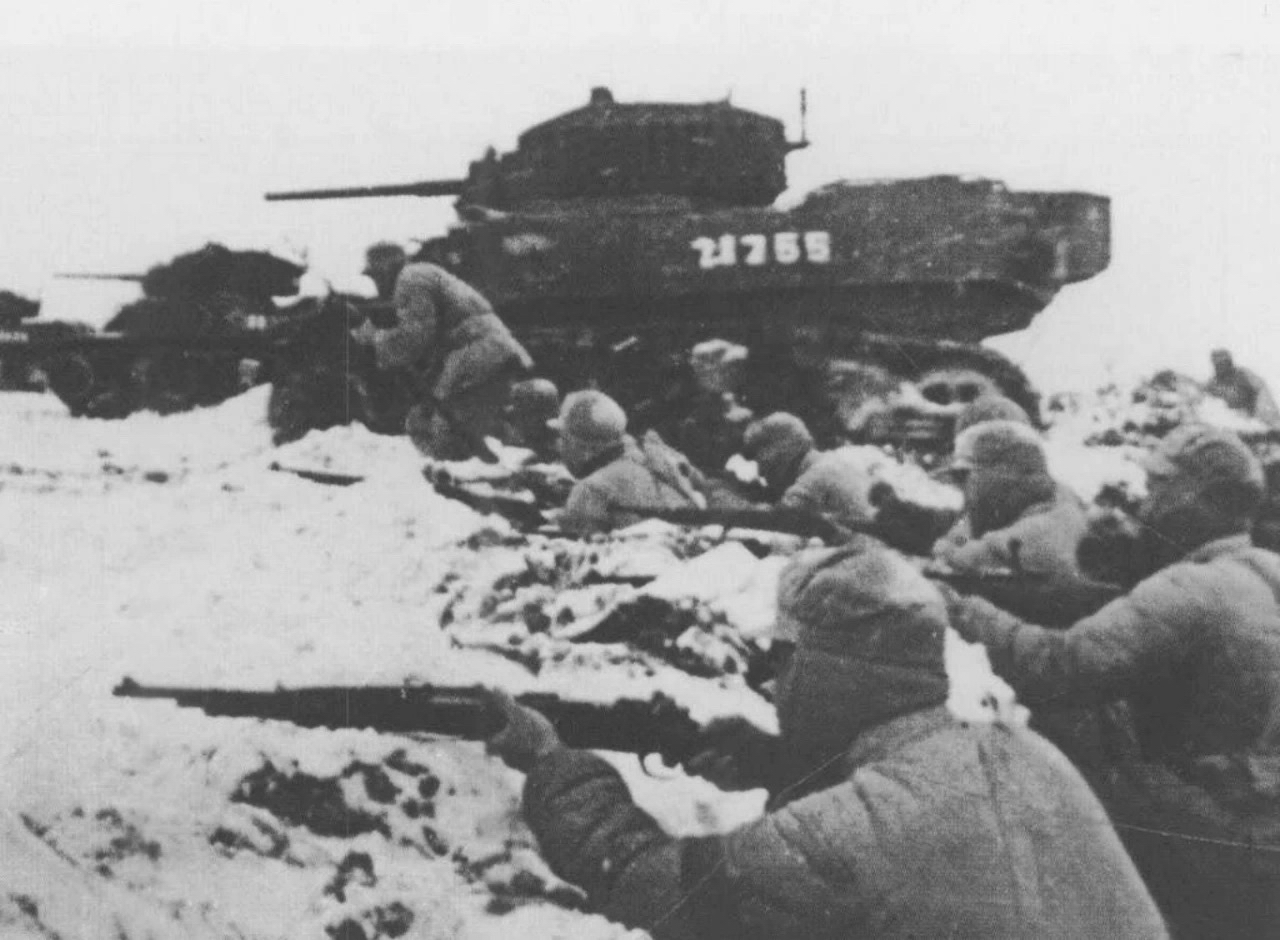
- People's Liberation Army troops, supported by captured M5 Stuart light tanks, attacking the Nationalist lines
Date	6 November 1948 – 10 January 1949 (2 months and 4 days)
Location	Shandong, Jiangsu, Anhui, Henan, China
Result	Communist victory
Territorial changes	Communists occupy areas north of the Yangtze

Belligerents
(Republic of China (1912–1949)) Republic of China government: Republic of China Army; General Suppression Headquarters of Xuzhou Garrison	Chinese Communist Party: Third Field Army (East China Field Army); Second Field Army (Central Plains Field Army)

Commanders and leaders
(Republic of China (1912–1949)) Liu Zhi; (Republic of China (1912–1949)) Du Yuming (POW); (Republic of China (1912–1949)) Huang Wei (POW); (Republic of China (1912–1949)) Huang Baitao ‡‡; (Republic of China (1912–1949)) Qiu Qingquan ‡‡; (Republic of China (1912–1949)) Hu Lien; (Republic of China (1912–1949)) Li Mi; (Republic of China (1912–1949)) Li Yannian; (Republic of China (1912–1949)) Liu Ruming; (Republic of China (1912–1949)) Sun Yuanliang	Liu Bocheng; Deng Xiaoping; Su Yu; Tan Zhenlin; Chen Yi

Strength
800,000	1,060,000 combatants - 660,000 regulars, 400,000 irregulars

Casualties and losses
Total: 555,099 of which 327,000 were either captured or went over to the Communists.	Total: 134,000

The Huaihai campaign (Chinese: 淮海戰役; pinyin: Huáihǎi Zhànyì) (Note: Huai for Huai'an and Huaibei, Hai for Haizhou), or Battle of Hsupeng (traditional Chinese: 徐蚌會戰; simplified Chinese: 徐蚌会战; pinyin: Xúbèng Huìzhàn) (Note: Hsu for Xuzhou (previously spelled as Hsuchow), Peng for Bengbu (previously spelled as Pengpu)), was the second of the three major campaigns that was fought between the Kuomintang (KMT) and the Chinese Communist Party (CCP) during the Chinese Civil War. The campaign started when the People's Liberation Army (PLA) of the CCP launched a major offensive against KMT forces operating between the city of Xuzhou and Huai River areas on 6 November 1948, and ended on 10 January 1949 with the destruction or surrender of major KMT forces in the region.

The Huaihai campaign was the most important campaign of the Chinese Civil War as it resulted in the heaviest losses of KMT forces. Following the end of the campaign, the CCP had captured a vast area of territories north of the Yangtze River and threatened the defence of Nanjing, Shanghai and Wuhan directly.

== Background ==
After the fall of Jinan to the CCP on 24 September 1948, the PLA began planning for a larger campaign to engage the remaining Nationalist forces in the Shandong province and their main force in Xuzhou.

In the face of the rapidly deteriorating military situation in the Northeast, the Nationalist government decided to go on a strategic defence and deploy their forces on both sides of the Tianjin–Pukou Railway to prevent the PLA from advancing south toward the Yangtze River.When opportunity arises, the KMT will seek to engage and destroy the CCP forces in a decisive battle.

=== PLA strategy ===
Su Yu (粟裕), the acting commander of the East China Field Army proposed an plan to the CCP Central Military Commission (CMC) to maintain operational momentum following the Jinan campaign and proceed southwards to seize more territories before the onset of winter. He wanted a thrust southwards towards to secure cities of Huaian (淮安), Baoying (宝应), Gaoyou (高邮) along the Grand Canal followed by the coastal cities of Haizhou (海州) and Lianyungang (连云港). He dubbed it the 'Huaihai' Campaign. Mao Zedong agreed to this plan but included the destruction of the KMT 7th Field Army at Xin'an (新安, present day Xinyi, Jiangsu) as an additional objective.

Mao Zedong further expanded this initial plan by ordering the Central Plains Field Army under Liu Bocheng and Deng Xiaoping to advance from the west to attack eastwards to capture Zhengzhou (郑州), Suxian (宿县) and Bengbu 蚌埠 in order to isolate Xuzhou.

It was the first time the CCP coordinated and executed a multi-army group operation. On 1 Nov, 1948, it was decided that Chen Yi and Deng Xiaoping will have operational command of this campaign.

The aim of this campaign was not about the seizing of territories but the destruction of major KMT forces (numbering 800,000 men) to prevent their withdrawal south of the Yangtze River.

== Order of Battle ==
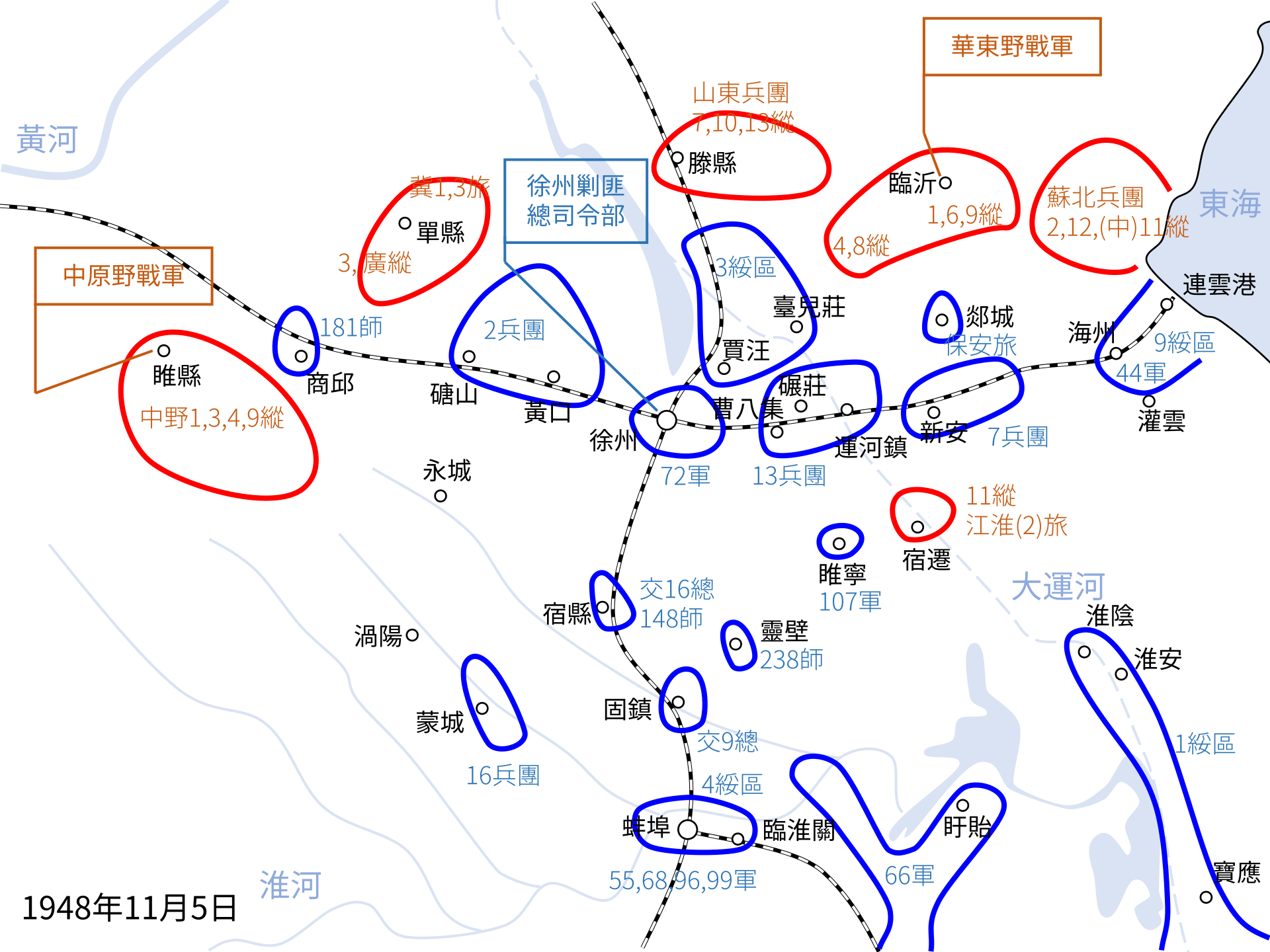
Map of Hsupeng battle (Huaihai campaign) on Nov 05 1948

=== People's Liberation Army ===
Two field armies of the People's Liberation Army were directly involved. The East China Field Army, holding the sector between Teng county and the East China Sea, was led by Chen Yi with Su Yu acting; the Central Plains Field Army, holding the region northwest of Xuzhou in Henan, was led by Liu Bocheng with Deng Xiaoping as commissar.

=== Deployments ===
- East China Field Army (华东野战军) – Chen Yi, Su Yu (acting)
  - 1st Column – Ye Fei
  - 3rd Column – Sun Jixian
  - 4th Column – Tao Yong
  - 6th Column – Wang Bicheng
  - 8th Column – Zhang Renchu
  - 10th Column – Song Shilun
  - Southwest Shandong Column (鲁中南纵队) – Qian Jun
  - Guangdong-Guangxi Column (两广纵队) – Zeng Sheng
  - Special Forces Column (特种兵纵队) – Chen Ruiting
  - Shandong Army (山东兵团) – Xu Shiyou, Tan Zhenlin (acting)
    - 7th Column – Cheng Jun
    - 9th Column – Nie Fengzhi
    - 13th Column – Zhou Zhijian
    - Bohai Column – Yuan Yelie
  - North Jiangsu Army (苏北兵团) – Wei Guoqing
    - 2nd Column – Teng Haiqing
    - 11th Column – Hu Bingyun
    - 12th Column – Xie Zhenhua
  - Field Army Mobilization Command (野战军动员地方部队)
    - North Jiangsu Military District (苏北军区) – Guan Wenwei
    - Jianghuai Military District (江淮军区) – Chen Qingxian
    - Central-South Shandong Military District (鲁中南军区) – Fu Qiutao
    - Jiaodong Military District (胶东军区) – Tan Xilin
    - Bohai Military District (渤海军区) – Yuan Yelie
    - Hebei-Shandong-Henan Military District (冀鲁豫军区) – Zhao Jianmin
- Central Plains Field Army (中原野战军) – Liu Bocheng, Deng Xiaoping (Commissar)
  - 1st Column – Yang Yong
  - 2nd Column – Chen Zaidao
  - 3rd Column – Chen Xilian
  - 4th Column – Chen Geng
  - 6th Column – Wang Jinshan
  - 9th Column – Qin Jiwei
  - 11th Column – Wang Bingzhang
  - Field Army Mobilization Command (野战军动员地方部队)
    - Henan-Anhui-Jiangsu Military District (豫皖苏军区) – Zhang Guohua
    - South Shaanxi Military District (陕南军区) – Liu Jinxuan
    - Tongbai Military District (桐柏军区) – Wang Hongkun
    - Hubei-Henan Military District (鄂豫军区) – Wang Shusheng
    - West Anhui Military District (豫西军区) – Zeng Shaoshan

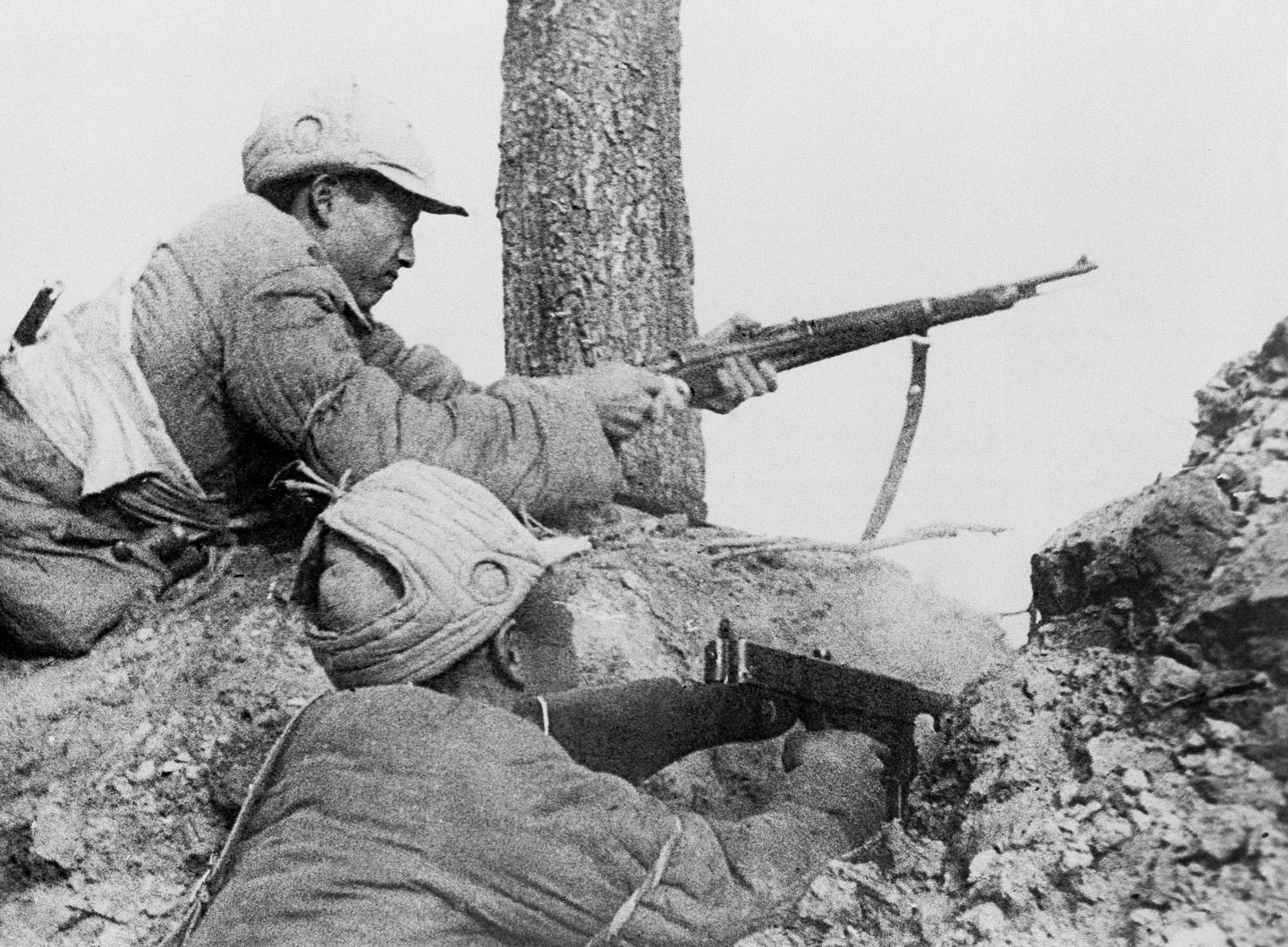
Nationalist troops defending hilltop positions during the campaign

=== Republic of China Army ===
All Nationalist forces involved in the battle (except 12th Army) were under the command of the General Suppression Headquarters of Xuzhou Garrison. Xuzhou Garrison also owned a considerable number of elements of ROC Air Forces stationed in Nanjing, Xuzhou, and Bengbu: either under the direct command of GHQ Xuzhou Garrison, or controlled straight through the mobilization of the Air Force Command authority.

=== Deployments ===
A Nationalist soldier and machine gunner deployed at the front-line artillery position

General Suppression Headquarters of Xuzhou Garrison – Liu Zhi (刘峙)

- GHQ Xuzhou Garrison Forward Headquarters – Du Yuming (杜聿明)
  - 20th Corps – Yang Gancai(杨干才)
    - 133rd Division
    - 134th Division
  - 107th Corps – Sun Liangcheng] (孙良诚)
    - 260th Division - surrendered to the CCP on 13 Nov in the vicinity of Suining (睢宁)
    - 261st Division - refused to surrender and destroyed on 14 Nov.
- 2nd Field Army (第二兵团) – Qiu Qingquan (邱清泉)
  - 5th Corps – Xiong Xiaosan (熊笑三)
    - 45th Division
    - 46th Division
    - 200th Division
  - 70th Corps – Deng Junlin (邓军林)
    - 32nd Division
    - 96th Division
    - 139th Division
  - 72nd Corps – Yu Jinyuan (余锦源)
    - 34th Division
    - 122nd Division
    - 233rd Division
  - 74th Corps – Qiu Weida (邱维达)
    - 51st Division
    - 57th Division
    - 58th Division
  - 12th Corps – Shu Rong (舒荣)
    - 112th Division
    - 238th Division
  - 116th Corps – Tan Xin (谭心)
    - 287th Divison
    - 288th Division
- 6th Field Army – Li Yannian (李延年)
  - 39th Corps – Wang Boxun (王伯勋) - evacuated from Northeast and attached to 6th Field Army
    - 91st Division
    - 103rd Division
    - 147th Division
  - 54th Corps – Que Hanqian (阙汉骞) - evacuated from Northeast and attached to 6th Field Army
    - 8th Division
    - 198th Division
    - 291st Division
  - 96th Corps – Yu Zhaolong (于兆龙)
    - 141st Division
    - 212th Division
  - 99th Corps – Hu Changqing (胡长青)
    - 92nd Division
    - 99th Division
    - 268th Division
- 7th Field Army – Huang Baitao (黄百韬)
  - 25th Corps – Chen Shizhang (陈士章)
    - 40th Division
    - 108th Division
    - 148th Division - destroyed in the defence of Suxian on 15 Nov 1948.
    - 238th Division - destroyed in the defence of Lingbi (灵璧)
  - 44th Corps – Wang Zejun (王泽浚)
    - 150th Division
    - 162nd Division
  - 63rd Corps – Chen Zhang (陈章)
    - 152nd Division
    - 186th Division
  - 64th Corps – Liu Zhengxiang (刘镇湘)
    - 156th Division
    - 159th Division
  - 100th Corps – Zhao Zhidao (周志道)
    - 19th Division - destroyed in the battle of Jinan.
    - 44th Division
    - 63rd Division
- 8th Field Army (formerly 4th Pacification Zone) – Liu Ruming (刘汝明)
  - 55th Corps – Cao Fulin (曹福林)
    - 29th Division
    - 74th Division
    - 181st Division - attached to 2nd Field Army for the defence of Shangqiu (商丘), destroyed between 7-8 Nov 1948 at Zhanggongdian (张公店)
  - 68th Corps – Liu Ruzhen (刘汝珍)
    - 81st Division
    - 119th Division
    - 143rd Division
- 13th Field Army (第十三兵团) – Li Mi (李弥)
  - 8th Corps – Zhou Kaicheng (周开成)
    - 42nd Division
    - 170th Division
    - 237th Division
  - 9th Corps – Huang Shu (黄淑)
    - 3rd Division
    - 166th Division
    - 253rd Division
  - 115th Corps – Si Yuankai (司元恺)
    - 39th Division
    - 180th Division - reconstituted from remnants that did not defect with the 3rd Pacification Zone
- 16th Field Army (第十六兵团) – Sun Yuanliang (孙元良)
  - 41st Corps – Hu Lincong (胡临聪)
    - 122nd Division
    - 124th Division
  - 47th Corps – Wang Xiafeng (汪匣锋)
    - 125th Division
    - 127th Division
  - 2nd Rapid Response Column – Chen Shijun (陈仕俊)
- 3rd Pacification Zone – Feng Zhi'an (冯治安)
  - 59th Corps – Liu Zhensan (刘振三)
    - 38th Division - defected to the CCP on the night of 8 Nov 1948
    - 180th Division - defected to the CCP on the night of 8 Nov 1948
  - 77th Corps – Wang Changhai (王长海)
    - 37th Division - one regiment defected to the CCP on the night of 8 Nov 1948
    - 132nd Division - defected to the CCP on the night of 8 Nov 1948
- 12th Field Army (第十二兵团) – Huang Wei (黄维)
  - 10th Corps – Tan Daoshan (覃道善)
    - 18th Division
    - 75th Division
    - 114th Division
  - 14th Corps – Xiong Shouchun (熊绶春)
    - 10th Division
    - 83rd Division
    - 85th Division
  - 18th Corps – Yang Botao (杨伯涛)
    - 11th Division
    - 49th Division
    - 118th Division
  - 85th Corps – Wu Shaozhou (吴绍周)
    - 23rd Division - defected to the CCP
    - 110th Division - defected to the CCP
    - 216th Division
  - 4th Rapid Response Column – Yin Zhongyue (尹钟岳)

== Campaign ==
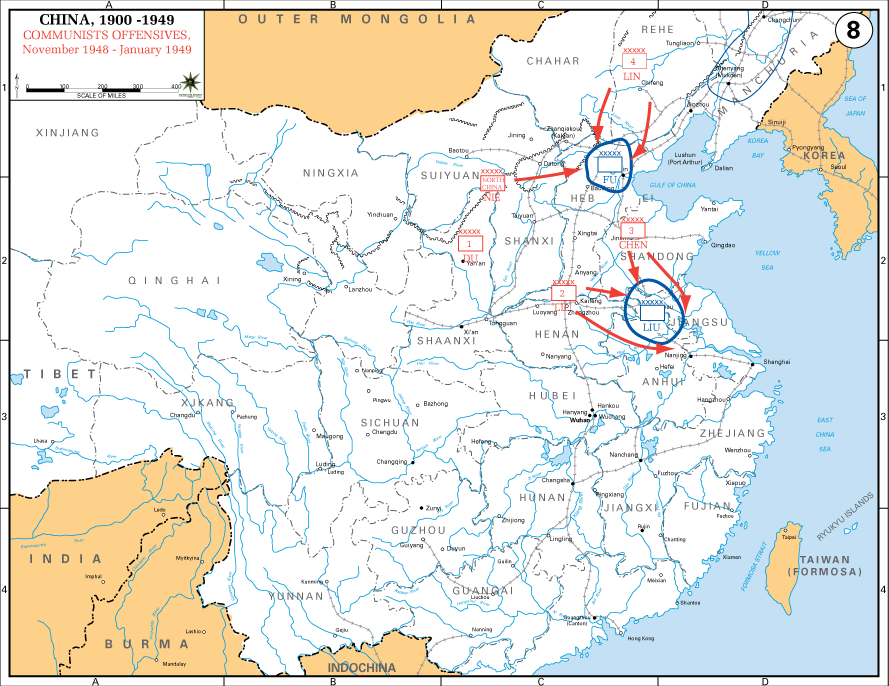
Communist forces' campaigns during November 1948 up to January 1949, the northern one being the Ping-Jin campaign, and the southern one being the Huai-Hai campaign.

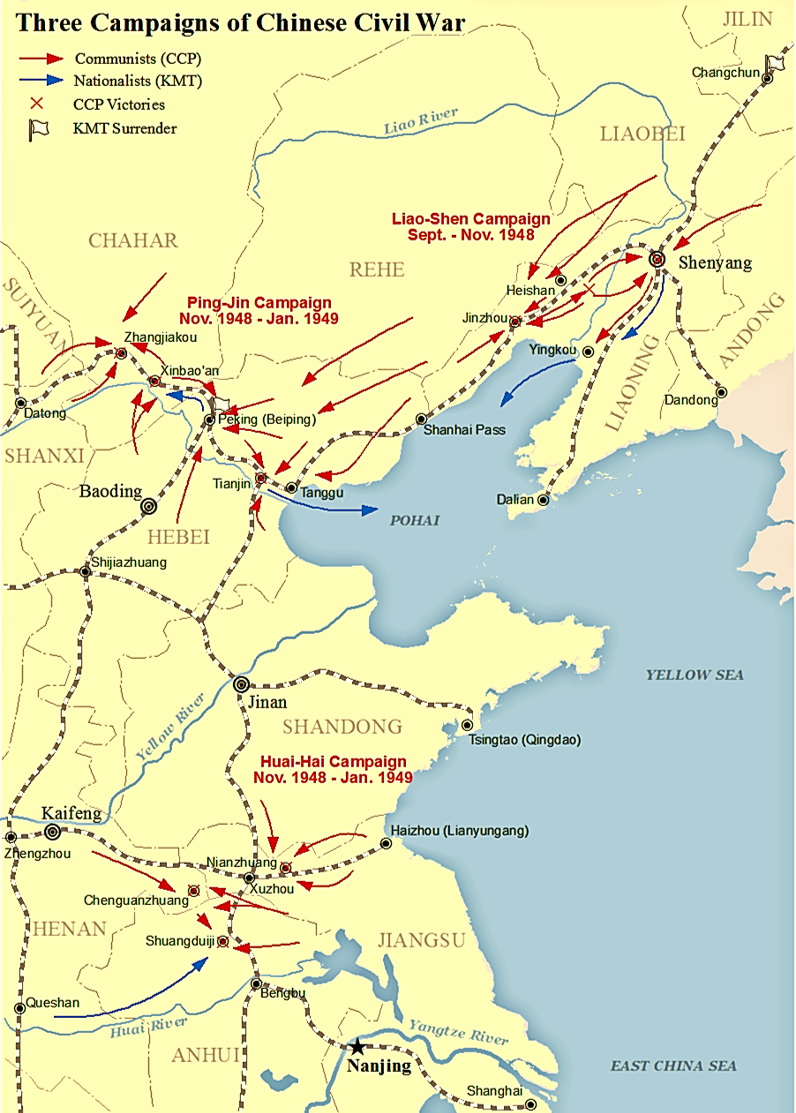
Map showing the Huaihai campaign as one of the three campaigns during the Chinese Civil War

=== Preliminary Moves (Oct - Nov 1948) ===
On 22 Oct, 1948, the CCP's Central Plains Field Army launched their attack on Zhengzhou (郑州) and captured it within the day. Thereafter Kaifeng (开封) fell on 24 Oct. Following discussions with the CMC, the Central Plains Field Army now split into 2 with (1) 4 columns advancing to assemble at Yongcheng (永城) area and prepare to disrupt the Tianjin–Pukou Railway and (2) 2 columns moving south to delay and disrupt the KMT 12th Field Army which was moving to reinforce Xuzhou.

The East China Field Army continued to deploy their forces southwards from Jinan and planned to launch their attack on the KMT 7th Field Army on the evening of 8 Nov.

Within the KMT, there were differing views on the defence plan. Xuzhou, although strategically valuable was deemed to be hard to defend and easily isolated. The alternative was withdraw further south to realign the defence to the Huai River at Bengbu. In the end, Chiang Kai Shek decided to centre the defence around Xuzhou.

On 5 Nov, 1948, the KMT issued the latest defence orders; the 16th Field Army was to redeploy from Mengcheng (蒙城) to reinforce Xuzhou, the 7th Field Army at Xin'an (新安, present day Xinyi, Jiangsu) was to withdraw to the east of Xuzhou, the 2nd Field Army was to defend west of Xuzhou and the 13th Field Army at Caobaji (曹八集) and Daxujia (大许家) areas was to tuck in closer to defend east of Xuzhou. In addition, the 12th Field Army at Zhumadian (驻马店) in Henan was also ordered to reinforce Xuzhou.

=== First Encirclement (6–22 November 1948) ===
As the KMT 7th Field Army, under the command of Lieutenant General Huang Baitao began its redeployment to Xuzhou on 6 Nov, they were delayed by the single bridge crossing across the Grand Canal at Yunhe (运河镇) as well as the need to link up with the 44th Corps/9th Pacification Zone which was withdrawing from Haizhou (海州) about 60 km away. Realizing that the 7th Field Army was moving, units of the CCP East China Field Army brought forward their attack and began pursuing the 7th Field Army on the night of 6 Nov.

The 7th Field Army began crossing the Grand Canal on the morning of 7 Nov. The order of crossing was 64th Corps, Army HQ, 44th Corps, 100th Corps and 25th Corps. 63rd Corps was the rearguard and will cross separately at Yaowan (窑湾). However by the night of 8 Nov, the 100th, 25th and 63rd Corps remained on the east side of the Grand Canal and the advance elements of the East China Field Army began attacking the bridgehead. The crossing continued under fire throughout 9 Nov until the bridge was blown.

On the night of 8 Nov, three quarters of the 3rd Pacification Zone which had been defending Grand Canal about 20 km the northwest of the 7th Field Army defected. The 13th Field Army at Caobaji (曹八集) and Daxujia (大许家) areas had withdrawn as planned towards Xuzhou, further exposing a large gap in the withdrawal route for the 7th Field Army.

Huang Baitao decided to reorganize his forces in Nianzhuang (碾庄) before proceeding westwards. A defensive perimeter was set-up with 100th Corps defending the west, 25th Corps to the north, 44th Corps to the south and 64th Corps to the east. The perimeter was 3 km in depth and 6 km in length. His last troops, the 63rd Corps, was unable to cross the Grand Canal at Yaowan and remained cut-off from the rest of the 7th Field Army. It was destroyed in-situ by the CCP's 1st Column between 10-12 Nov 1948.

By 11 Nov, the 7th, 10th and 13th Columns of the East China Field Army successfully crossed the Grand Canal in the defence area previously occupied by the defected 3rd Pacification Zone, captured Caobaji (曹八集) and Daxujia (大许家) and succeeded in cutting 7th Field Army's withdrawal route to Xuzhou. Other elements the East China Field Army completed the encirclement of the 7th Field Army at Nianzhuang, 60 km from Xuzhou. Huang Baitao decided to hold at Nianzhuang to await relief from Xuzhou.

To the west, the 2nd Field Army was able to complete its withdrawal to Xuzhou as planned. However, the rearguard 181st Division was left at Zhanggondian (张公店). It was attacked by CCP forces which succeeded in destroying/capturing 181st Division by 8 Nov.

Attempted Relief of 7th Field Army

On 10 Nov, Chiang Kai-shek ordered Du Yuming, the Deputy Commander of the Nationalist garrison in Xuzhou to relief the 7th Field Army encircled at Nianzhuang. Du Yuming flew to Xuzhou in the early morning of 11 Nov and set about organizing forces for the relief. He want to wanted to employ the 2nd, 13th and 12th Field Armies to destroy the Central Plains Field Army that were approaching to the west before swinging east to relief the 7th Field Army. Liu Zhi was rejected this idea because he was worried that the 7th Field Army could not hold out that long. The final agreed relief plan was (1) 74th Corps/2nd Field Army to defend to the northwest of Xuzhou (2) 16th Field Army will redeploy from Suxian (宿县) and defend Xuzhou to the south (3) the rest of 2nd Field Army and the 13th Field Army will attack eastwards from Xuzhou so as to link up with the 7th Field Army. The redeployment of forces were to take place throughout 12 Nov and the relief effort was to be launched on 13 Nov.

Between 13 - 22 Nov, 1948, the KMT relief forces from the 2nd and 13th Field Armies were successfully blocked by 7th, 10th and 11th Columns. The 7th Field Army put up a tenacious defence but remained trapped in a shrinking perimeter under repeated attacks. The failure to destroy the 7th Field Army also frustrated Su Yu.

The 16th Field Army which had previously occupied Suxian (宿县) had been redeployed to the north to defend Xuzhou, leaving a single re-fitting division (148th Div/25th Corps/2nd Field Army) to defend it. The weakened defence allowed the Central Plains Field Army to capture Suxian (宿县) between 13-15 Nov and severed the link between Xuzhou and Bengbu. Chiang ordered the 12th Field Army to recapture Suxian from the southwest and also ordered the newly organized 6th and 7th Field Armies to launch attacks from Bengbu to support the 12th Field Army.

By 19 Nov, the 44th and 100th Corps had been largely decimated leaving Huang Baitao's 7th Field Army with only the 25th and 64th Corps. The final assault launched on the night of 19 Nov overrun the 25th Corps. All resistance in the final 64th Corps perimeter ceased on 22 Nov. The destruction of the 7th Field Army was completed when its commander, Huang Baitao committed suicide on the night of 22 Nov, 1948. Between 2,000 to 3,000 men escaped back to friendly lines, 25,000 were killed and 80,000 were either wounded or captured.

=== Second Encirclement (23 November – 15 December 1948) ===
Since 16 Nov, 1948, the CCP had successfully blocked the efforts by the KMT 6th (led by Lieutenant General Li Yannian) and 7th Field Armies (led by Lieutenant General Liu Ruming) to recapture Suxian (宿县) from Bengbu (蚌埠). The CCP focused their next effort on the destruction of the KMT 12th Field Army (led by Lieutenant General Huang Wei) which was advancing to recapture Suxian from the southwest. The destruction of these KMT forces will further isolate the KMT forces holding Xuzhou.

By 21 Nov, 1948, the 12th Field Army had reached Nanpingji (南坪集, present day Nanping) which was about 16 km southwest of Suxian. Having detected CCP efforts to encircle his forces, Huang Wei ordered the 12th Army on 23 Nov to switch their direction of advance towards Guzhen (固镇) in the southeast and attempt to link up with the 6th Field Army. However, the rapid movement of CCP Central Plains Field Army managed to entrap the KMT 12th Field Army in the Shuangduiji (双堆集) area by 25 Nov. A breakout effort on 27 Nov was disrupted by the defection of its 110th Division. Thereafter, the 12th Field Army decided to sit tight and await relief.

On 28 Nov, Chiang Kai-shek ordered Du Yuming to evacuate the remaining KMT forces (2nd, 13th and 16th Field Armies) at Xuzhou and withdraw towards Fuyang (阜阳), almost 200 km to the southwest. The evacuation of Xuzhou by its 300,000 KMT forces commenced on the night of 30 Nov.

The withdrawal of the Xuzhou garrison was hotly pursued by the CCP's East China Field Army. Other CCP forces moved to Yongcheng (永城) to block their withdrawal. On 3 Dec, Chiang Kai Shek airdropped a handwritten order for Du Yuming to attack southeast towards Shuangduiji to rescue the encircled 12th Field Army.

By then, the withdrawing Xuzhou garrison had themselves become encircled in the Chenguanzhuang (陈官庄) area. Du Yuming's attempt to breakout of the encirclement on 6 Dec towards the 12th Field Army was repulsed. 30,000 men of the 16th Field Army was either killed or captured and the remnants rejoined the encircled perimeter at Chenguanzhuang (陈官庄). Sun Yuanliang, the commander of the 16th Field Army managed to escape and made his way south to rejoin other KMT forces.

In the meantime, continual attacks in the past 2 weeks on the 12th Field Army shrank the defence perimeter further. The CCP launched their final assault on 12 Dec and destroyed the remaining ten divisions of the 12th Field Army by 15 Dec. Its commander, Huang Wei was captured.

=== Third Encirclement (15 December 1948 – 10 January 1949) ===
Following the destruction of the KMT 12th Field Army at Shuangduiji, the CCP switched their focus to the encircled 2nd and 13th Field Armies at Chenguanzhuang. The CCP conducted an operational pause and urged Du Yuming to surrender. He refused. Bad winter weather hampered the resupply of the trapped KMT forces by air. As food and ammunition diminished, many KMT soldiers killed their horses to feed themselves and CCP forces conducted psychological warfare to degrade the KMT forces' will to fight.

On 6 Jan 1949, the CCP forces launched their final assault on the encircled 13th and 2nd Field Armies. The KMT forces fought till 10 Jan before they were overrun. Du Yiming was captured, Qiu Qinquan (commander of the 2nd Field Army) was killed and Li Mi (commander of the 13th Field Army) managed to escape.

In the latter half of Jan, 1949, the remaining 6th and 8th Field Armies withdrew from Bengbu to prepare for the defence of Nanjing. The Huaihai campaign was concluded.

== Aftermath ==
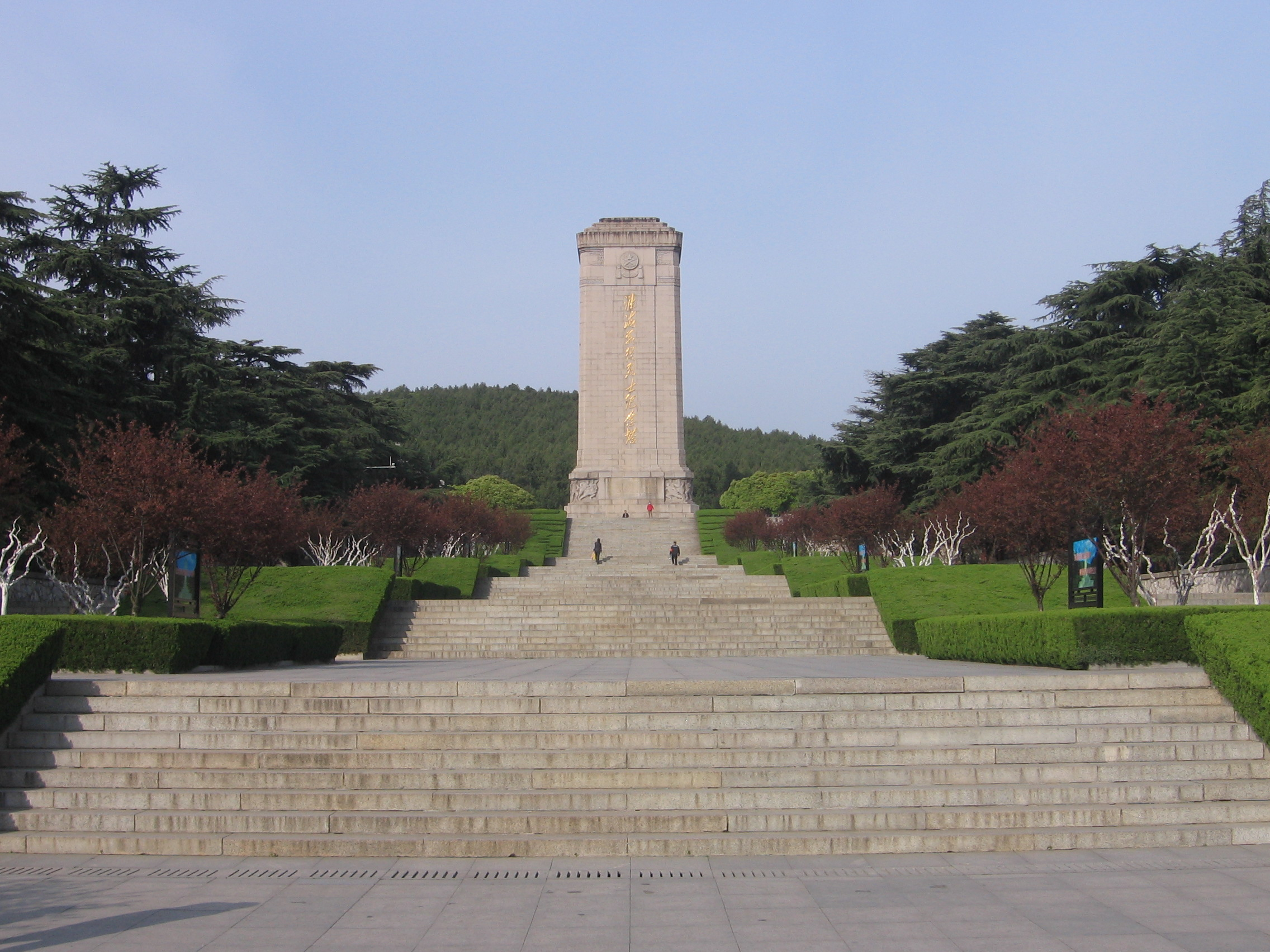
Huaihai Campaign Memorial Tower in Xuzhou

The heavy losses suffered by Whampoa-trained troops under the direct command of Chiang significantly weakened the position of Chiang in the Nationalist government. With pressure from former political rivals such as Li Zongren and Bai Chongxi, Chiang announced his temporary retirement. As the PLA approached the Yangtze, the momentum shifted completely toward the CCP side. Without effective measures against PLA advance across the Yangtze, the Nationalist government in Nanjing began losing their support from the United States, as American military aid gradually came to a stop. As a result, Chiang Kai-shek, the President of the Nationalist government, stepped down on January 21, 1949.

For the Huaihai Campaign, a special silver-plated copper medal was issued in the form of a badge with a star and rifles, which was awarded to Joseph Stalin and the city of Stalingrad.

=== Films ===
In 1991, the August First Film Studio released the epic war trilogy Decisive Engagement in commemoration of the 70th anniversary of the establishment of the CCP, the second film of which was centered on the Huaihai Campaign, starring Gu Yue as Mao Zedong, Zhao Hengduo as Chiang Kai-shek, Fu Xuecheng as Liu Bocheng, Liu Xitian as Chen Yi, Xie Weicai as Su Yu, Lu Qi as Deng Xiaoping, Xu Zhengyun as Du Yuming, Xu Huanshan as Huang Baitao and Sheng Zhong as Qiu Qingquan. The 2007 film Assembly was also based on the Huaihai campaign. More recently the Shanghai Film Studio (上海电影制片厂) made the 2009 film, The Founding of a Republic to commemorate the 60th year of the founding of the People's Republic of China; there was a scene dedicated to this campaign, also Assembly was initially set on this part of campaign, which the protagonist's group was sacrificed to save the whole regiment.

== See also ==
- Outline of the Chinese Civil War
- Outline of the military history of the People's Republic of China
