= Huang Wei =

Chinese general (1904–1989)

- 黃維
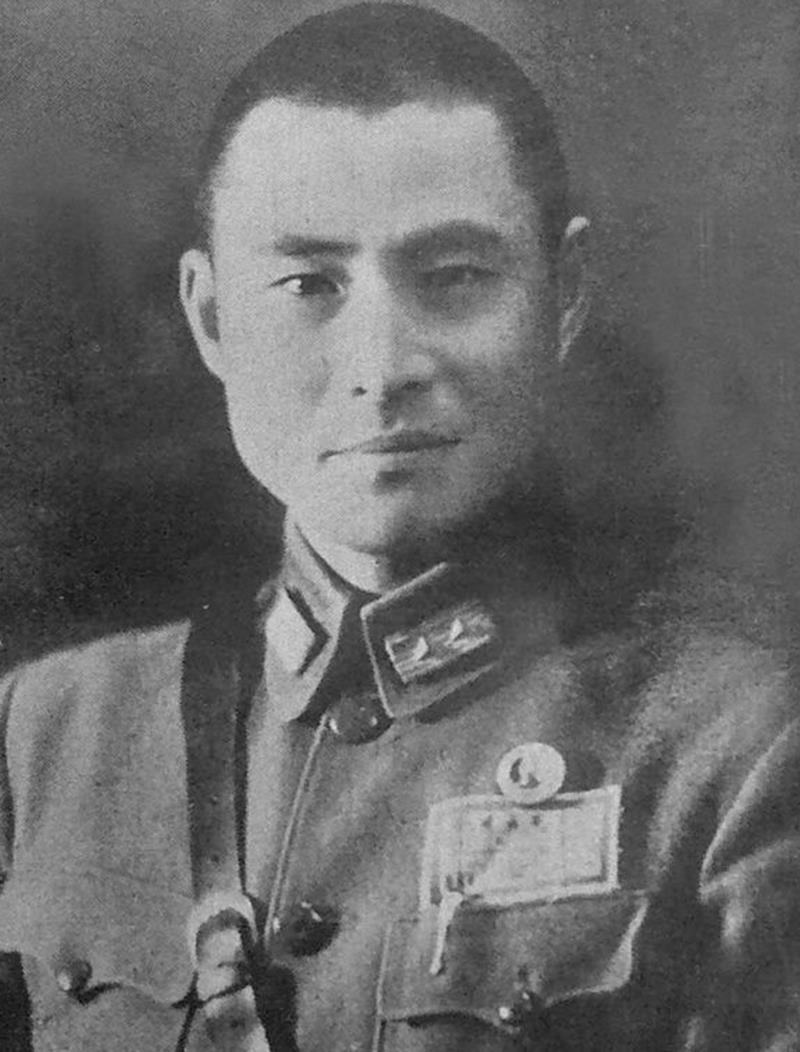
- Born: 28 February 1904; Guixi, Jiangxi
- Died: 30 March 1989 (aged 85); Beijing, People's Republic of China
- Military career
- Allegiance: Republic of China
- Branch: (Republic of China (1912–1949)) National Revolutionary Army
- Service years: 1927–1948
- Rank: Lieutenant General
- Nicknames: The Bookworm, The nerd
- Unit: 11th division
- Commands: 18th corps, 12th army
- Conflicts: Second Sino-Japanese War; Battle of Shanghai; Battle of Wuhan; Chinese Civil War; Huaihai Campaign
- Awards: Order of Precious Tripod, Order of Cloud and Banner
- Other work: inventor and writer

Huang Wei (Chinese: 黃維; 28 February 1904 – 30 March 1989) was a Chinese Nationalist military general who fought in the Encirclement Campaigns, Second Sino-Japanese War and Chinese Civil War.

== Early life and career ==
Huang was born into a rural intellectual family in Guixi, Jiangxi province in 1904. With the help of local friends and townsmen he was admitted to the elite Whampoa Military Academy. He was loyal, dutiful and brave in battle and caught the attention of Chen Cheng, his superior and senior military instructor who introduced him to Generalissimo Chiang Kai-shek. By the end of 1927, he was promoted to regimental commander of the 9th corps, in 1928 he was reassigned as regimental colonel of the 11th division, which Chen Cheng was the commander. In 1928 he was enrolled in the Army War College and after graduation he was promoted to 32nd brigade commander in the 11th division, now as part of the 18th corps, again Chen Cheng was the Corps superior general officer.

In 1933 he went to Germany to study and returned to China in 1937, while in his absence he was promoted to commander of the 11th division in 1934. In September 1937, he led the 67th division of the 18th corps in the Battle of Shanghai against the Imperial Japanese Army. In 1938 he was promoted to Corps commander of 18th corps and elevated to the rank of lieutenant general next year. In 1940 he was assigned as commander of the 54th corps and defense commander of Kunming, Yunnan province. Over next several years, he was assigned to a series important positions in the National Military Council and army training department. In 1945 he became commander of 31st army and deputy head of the logistical department. In 1948 he was made commandant of the newly established officer candidate school and headed the 12th army.

== Huaihai Campaign ==
In November 1948, Huang Wei led the 12th army from Henan province toward the East of Xuzhou to fight the communists. However, communist moles in the Kuomintang department of defense, such as Guo Ruhuai and Liu Fei, leaked vital military plans to the communist commanders. The American-armed 12th army headed into a trap sprang by the communist forces in nearly Su County, Anhui province, less than 30 miles from Xuzhou. In the Shuangduiji Campaign, which lasted nearly a month, the 12th army was destroyed. Huang's attempt to breakout from communist encirclement was foiled when nationalist Major General Liao Yunzhou, a secret member of the Chinese Communist Party, led his 110th Division to defect to the communist side. By December 13, nationalist forces under the command of Huang Wei held a small area of 1.5 km across. As Huang attempted to break out, his tank broke down and he was captured alive. The 12th Army was totally annihilated by dusk on December 15, 1948. Only his deputy commander Hu Lien was able to break out with eight thousand soldiers and escape back to Nanjing. Huang entered a period of initial interrogation and isolation typical for senior KMT captives, as documented in CCP military dispatches urging further surrenders.

== Imprisonment and political re-education ==
Huang Wei, one of the more famous KMT captives in CCP prison ranks, was politically valuable. Mao Zedong was pleased with his capture and did not allow his execution. Huang was classified as a Class A war criminal by the People's Republic of China and detained in specialized re-education facilities for captured Kuomintang (KMT) officers, including the Fushun War Criminals Management Centre in Liaoning Province and Beijing's Gongdelin Prison. These sites emphasized reform through labor and thought, involving daily group study sessions on Mao Zedong Thought, recitations of communist propaganda, and self-criticism meetings where prisoners publicly confessed to "counterrevolutionary crimes". Huang remained loyal to Chiang Kai-shek. His captivity was marked by his refusal to participate in reform, often challenging cadres during sessions by defending Nationalist actions and questioning communist narratives, which led to isolation, restricted privileges, and extended detention beyond the 1959-1960 releases of compliant generals like Du Yuming and Wang Yaowu. Huang was released in March 1975 after 26 years of imprisonment under a special amnesty granted by Mao Zedong to the remaining 10 unreformed KMT detainees.

== Study of perpetual motion ==
Initially, due to the relatively light workload assigned to high-ranking officers like him in prison, he began researching perpetual motion machines to combat boredom and escape the reality of his defeat and capture. However, after years of working in isolation within the confined environment, he became convinced that he could actually develop one. In 1968, believing Huang was mentally unwell, Zhou Enlai began funding Huang's research out of his own pocket, driven by both pity and curiosity. The experiments did not succeed, but when he was released in 1975 he continued to pursue the concept. He died in Beijing on March 30, 1989.
