= Du Yuming =

Chinese general (1904–1981)

- 杜聿明
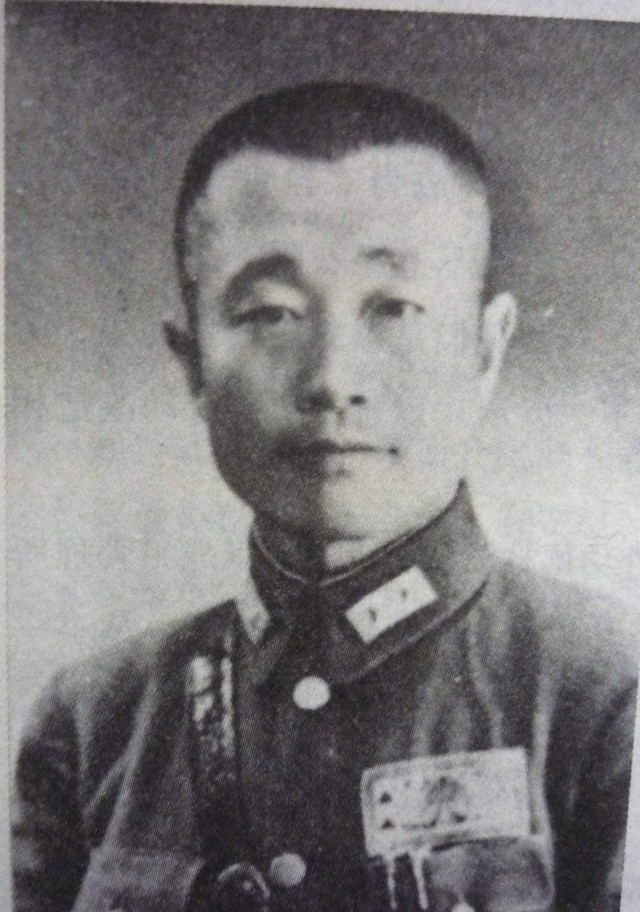
- Lieutenant General Du Yuming
- Born: 28 November 1904; Mizhi County, Shaanxi, Qing China
- Died: 7 May 1981 (aged 76); Beijing, China
- Relatives: Yang Chen-Ning (son-in-law)
- Military career
- Allegiance: Republic of China
- Branch: (Republic of China (1912–1949)) National Revolutionary Army
- Service years: 1924–1949
- Rank: Lieutenant General
- Unit: 200th Division
- Commands: 5th Corps, 2nd Army, Xuzhou Forward Command Center
- Conflicts: Northern Expedition; Second World War; Defense of the Great Wall; Battle of South Guangxi; Battle of Kunlun Pass; Burma Campaign; Chinese Civil War; Campaign to Defend Siping; Linjiang Campaign; Liaoshen Campaign; Huaihai Campaign
- Awards: Order of Blue Sky and White Sun
- Other work: Writer, researcher, historian

Du Yuming (Chinese: 杜聿明; pinyin: Dù Yùmíng; Wade–Giles: Tu Yü-ming; 28 November 1904 – 7 May 1981) was a Chinese National Revolutionary Army general. A graduate of the first class of the Whampoa Military Academy, he founded the Nationalists' first armoured units, won the Battle of Kunlun Pass in 1939 and commanded the Fifth Army in the Burma campaign of 1942. During the Chinese Civil War, he led Nationalist forces in Northeast China from 1945 to 1947, and he was captured at the end of the Huaihai campaign in January 1949. He was pardoned in 1959 and later worked on historical materials for the Chinese People's Political Consultative Conference. His son-in-law was the physicist Yang Chen-Ning.

== Early life ==
Du was born on 28 November 1904 in the city of Mizhi County, Shaanxi, into a landowning family. His father Du Liangkui was a juren who joined the Tongmenghui and opposed Yuan Shikai's attempt to make himself emperor. Du studied at Yulin Middle School, whose headmaster was his cousin Du Bincheng, and in August 1923 he married Cao Xiuqing, a woman from Mizhi. In 1924, with eleven other young men from Shaanxi, he travelled to Guangzhou, and on the recommendation of Yu Youren he entered the first class of the Whampoa Military Academy.

== Early career ==
After graduating in November 1924, Du served in the academy's 1st Training Regiment and took part in the Eastern Expedition of 1925. During the Northern Expedition, he was imprisoned by the forces of Sun Chuanfang in Nanjing but escaped to Wuhan, where he served under Zhang Zhizhong. From 1928, he held posts at the Central Military Academy in Nanjing and in the 4th Division under Xu Tingyao, rising to command a regiment and, in December 1932, a brigade of the 25th Division.

In March 1933, during the Defense of the Great Wall, Du was deputy commander of the 25th Division at Gubeikou. When the divisional commander Guan Linzheng was wounded, Du took over and led the division until it was withdrawn on 12 March. He was promoted to major general in October 1936.

== Second Sino-Japanese War ==
=== Armoured forces and Kunlun Pass ===
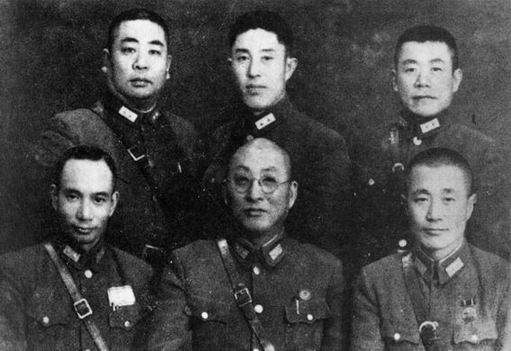
NRA Generals who took part in the Defense of the Great Wall, in a group photo in Chongqing. Du is sitting, far right (1942)

In May 1937, Du became the first commander of the Nationalists' first armoured regiment, formed from the tank battalion of the army's transport school. During the Battle of Shanghai, two of its companies helped the infantry resist Japanese landings at the Huishan docks. On 15 January 1938, the regiment was expanded into the 200th Division, the Nationalists' first mechanised division, with Du as its commander. In 1939, the division became the core of the new Fifth Army, and on 19 November 1939 Du was appointed its commander.

In December 1939, during the Battle of South Guangxi, the Fifth Army attacked the Japanese at Kunlun Pass, which they had taken after landing on the Guangxi coast and occupying Nanning. The army took the pass on 31 December after 18 days of fighting, and the Japanese brigade commander Nakamura Masao was killed during the battle. The battle was the first in which Chinese forces combined infantry, tanks, artillery and aircraft.

=== Burma campaign ===
In 1941, Du was a member of a Chinese military mission that toured Burma, India and Malaya. On 16 March 1942, he was appointed deputy commander, and acting commander, of the First Route Army of the Chinese Expeditionary Force, while keeping command of the Fifth Army. The army fought the Japanese at Toungoo, and in late March Du withdrew the 200th Division from the town against the wishes of the American general Joseph Stilwell. According to the American official historians Charles F. Romanus and Riley Sunderland, Du had ignored Stilwell's orders at Toungoo, and the later plan for a counteroffensive at Pyinmana was known as "General Tu's Plan".

When the Allied front collapsed in April 1942, Chiang Kai-shek ordered the Fifth Army to retreat to Myitkyina and China rather than to India. Much of the Fifth Army withdrew into China against the advice of Sun Li-jen and suffered heavy losses, while Sun's division reached India intact. The commander of the 200th Division, Dai Anlan, was mortally wounded as his division fought its way back to China. Du led the rest of his forces through the mountains of northern Burma and, when the monsoon blocked the way, into India. According to Chinese accounts, only about 40,000 of the expeditionary force's 100,000 men returned, and more died during the retreat than in battle. Chiang wrote in his diary that the loss of Dai could have been avoided if Du had followed his orders.

=== Kunming ===
In January 1943, Chiang made Du commander of the new 5th Army Group and of the Kunming garrison. He was promoted to lieutenant general on 20 February 1945. On Chiang's orders, Du prepared to remove Long Yun, the governor of Yunnan. On 3 October 1945, after the central government ordered Long's transfer to Chongqing, troops of the Fifth Army surrounded Yunnan forces in and around Kunming, and fighting lasted several hours. Long held out on Wuhua Hill until Premier T. V. Soong flew in and persuaded him to leave for Chongqing. On 16 October, Chiang publicly dismissed Du for mishandling the affair, and Du later said that he had taken the blame on Chiang's behalf.

== Chinese Civil War ==
=== Northeast China ===
Two days after his dismissal, Du was appointed commander of the Northeast Security Command. In November 1945, he retook strategic positions around Shanhaiguan from Communist forces, and on 22 November he took the city of Jinzhou, which led the Communists to abandon attempts to take the region's major cities and agree to a temporary ceasefire. In March 1946, he had a kidney removed in a hospital in Beiping. Fighting resumed in April 1946, and in May Du defeated Lin Biao in the Battle of Siping. He then pursued the Communists, capturing Gongzhuling on 21 May and Changchun on 23 May, until his advance was halted on the south bank of the Songhua River for fear of overextending his forces. His victory at Siping led to a general ceasefire brokered by George Marshall, during which Du consolidated his lines of communication and supply.

The ceasefire in Northeast China held until January 1947, when Du sent most of his forces against Communist positions near the Korean border. Lin Biao then sent 20,000 soldiers across the Songhua River, where they raided garrisons, ambushed relief columns and destroyed bridges, railways and other infrastructure. When Du turned north, Communist forces in the south besieged his troops at Tonghua, and when he sent them back south against the Communist base at Linjiang, they were ambushed and destroyed. Chiang Kai-shek rejected his request for reinforcements. After these defeats, Du concentrated on defending Changchun, Jilin City, Siping and western Liaoning, and he lost the initiative.

On 11 June 1947, Lin's forces besieged Siping, which was held by Chen Mingren with 29,000 men. The defenders, supported from the air, twice drove the Communists out of the city, and on 1 July the siege was broken and the attackers withdrew north of the Songhua. Chiang treated the battle as a decisive victory, but he recalled Du from the northeast and replaced him with Chen Cheng. Du had fallen ill, and on 8 July 1947 he left for treatment in Shanghai.

=== Liaoshen and Huaihai ===
In August 1948, Du was appointed deputy commander of the Xuzhou Forward Command Center. In October, during the Liaoshen campaign, Chiang sent him back to the northeast to lead the attempt to retake Jinzhou, and after its failure he organised the evacuation of Nationalist troops by sea from Huludao. On 11 November, he arrived in Xuzhou as commander of its forward command headquarters, charged with relieving Huang Baitao's army, which was encircled at Nianzhuangxu.

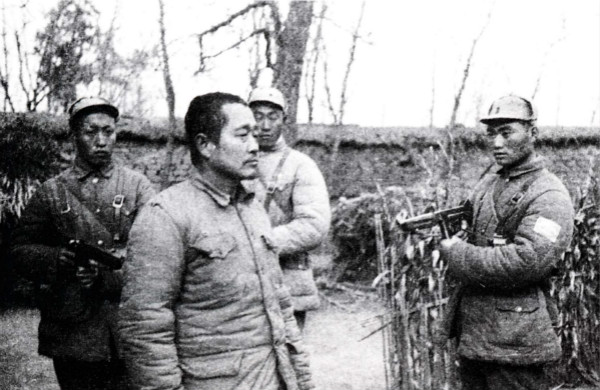
Du following his capture by the People's Liberation Army following his surrender (1948)

After Huang's army was destroyed, Du planned the withdrawal of the Xuzhou armies to the west, which began on 1 December 1948. On 3 December, an order from Chiang was dropped from the air, directing Du to turn south to relieve Huang Wei's army instead. Du's army group of about 250,000 men was surrounded the next day near Chenguanzhuang, and on 6 December its Sixteenth Army was destroyed in a failed breakout. On 17 December, the People's Liberation Army broadcast an appeal urging Du to surrender. Chiang offered to fly him out for medical treatment, but Du refused to leave his men. The final Communist attack began on 6 January 1949, and Du was captured during the breakout on 10 January.

== Imprisonment and later life ==
After his capture, Du was tried as a war criminal and held at the Gongdelin prison in Beijing. On 4 December 1959, he was among the first 33 war criminals pardoned by the People's Republic of China, together with Puyi. According to the American historian Gary Bjorge, family connections contributed to his release. On 1 March 1961, he joined the first group of commissioners for literary and historical materials of the Chinese People's Political Consultative Conference. In this role, he wrote accounts of the Burma, Liaoshen and Huaihai campaigns and of the removal of Long Yun. During the Cultural Revolution, he and other former Nationalist generals were harassed by Red Guards, but Zhou Enlai intervened to protect them. In 1978, he became a deputy to the 5th National People's Congress and a member of the standing committee of the 5th National Committee of the CPPCC, and he wrote and broadcast appeals to former colleagues in Taiwan to support reunification.

Du died of kidney failure in Beijing on 7 May 1981. At his memorial service on 21 May, which Deng Xiaoping attended, the CPPCC vice-chairman Xiao Ke described him as a noted patriot. His ashes were first placed at the Babaoshan Revolutionary Cemetery, and in 2015 his children moved them to the family cemetery in Mizhi.

== Personal life ==
Du's younger half-brother Du Yude was a commander in the Chinese Red Army and was captured and killed in 1928. His cousin Du Bincheng, a member of the China Democratic League, was arrested by the Nationalists in 1947 and executed, and Du was criticised for doing little to save him.

Du and his wife Cao Xiuqing had three sons and three daughters. After his capture, Cao took their children to Taiwan, and she later moved to the United States before rejoining Du in Beijing in 1963. Their eldest daughter Du Zhili married the physicist Yang Chen-Ning in 1950. Their eldest son Du Zhiren died in the United States in 1956.

== Assessments ==
In July 1947, the American general Albert C. Wedemeyer told the Chinese ambassador Wellington Koo that Du was unfit for his command in the northeast, and that Sun Li-jen was better suited to it. Bai Chongxi praised the training and combat record of Du's Fifth Army. Zhang Fakui, under whom Du fought in Guangxi, described him in his memoirs as a capable but arrogant soldier.

== Promotions ==
- Colonel (2 May 1935)
- Major general (5 October 1936)
- Lieutenant general (20 February 1945)

== Honours ==
- Order of the Precious Tripod, fourth class (1940)
- Order of Loyalty and Diligence (10 October 1945)
- Medal of Victory in the War of Resistance (5 May 1946)
- Order of Blue Sky and White Sun (13 March 1947)
- Order of the Cloud and Banner, third class (14 March 1947)
- Medal of the Armed Forces, A-1

== See also ==
- Sun Liren
- New 1st Army
- Yang Chen-Ning, once son-in-law of Du
