= Huang Baitao =

Chinese general (1900–1948)

- 黄百韬
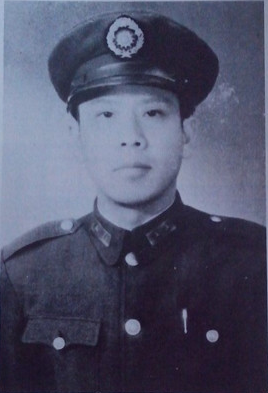
- Born: 9 September 1900; Tianjin, Zhili, Qing China
- Died: 22 November 1948 (aged 48); Nianzhuang, Jiangsu, Republic of China
- Military career
- Allegiance: Republic of China
- Branch: (Republic of China (1912–1949)) National Revolutionary Army
- Service years: 1927–1948
- Rank: General
- Nickname: Huang the Bald
- Unit: Jiangxi Provincial Army
- Commands: 25th Corps, 7th Army
- Conflicts: Second Sino-Japanese War; New Fourth Army Incident; Battle of Zhejiang-Jiangxi; Chinese Civil War; Huaihai Campaign
- Awards: Order of Blue Sky and White Sun

Huang Baitao (Chinese: 黄百韬; 9 September 1900 – 22 November 1948), also known as Huang Botao (黄百韬), was a Chinese Nationalist general active in the Second Sino-Japanese War and Chinese Civil War, for which he was twice awarded the Order of Blue Sky and White Sun, the second highest military award in the Nationalist and then Republic of China military honors system.

== Early years and career ==
Huang's family was from Meixian, Guangdong, but he was born in Tianjin. After a stint of serving in the units of various northern warlords, he joined Chiang Kai-shek's forces during the Northern Expedition. During the Second Sino-Japanese War, he was promoted from a staff officer to command positions in regiment, brigade and division levels solely based on merit and attended the Chinese Army War College, and assigned as chief of staff of the third, six and ninth war zones, and he helped to plan the New Fourth Army Incident and wiped out a large numbers of Communist troops. In 1946, when the Chinese Civil War restarted he was promoted to command the 25th Corps.

== Rise to fame ==
In December 1947, Huang helped the Nationalist army to evacuate from the Shandong province, and stopped the Communist advances led by Su Yu at Central China in the Eastern Henan Campaign around the summer of 1948. His actions helped save two KMT units from destruction. President Chiang Kai-shek decorated him with the Order of Blue Sky and White Sun and promoted him to command the 7th army. However, his promotion did not sit well with other Nationalist commanders, notably Lieutenant General Qiu Qingquan, commander of 5th corps, and Communist moles in the KMT army spread rumors so their working relationship was very tense.

== Huaihai Campaign and death ==
On November 8, 1948, the Huaihai Campaign was about to start, and the Nationalist department of defense decided to withdraw the 7th army and the 6th army from northern Jiangsu province to the Nationalist military headquarters in Xuzhou. Huang was ordered to wait for another KMT corps (44th corps) to arrive from the 9th pacification zone in Haizhou (海州) before he can travel across the Grand Canal, precious time of 2 days were wasted. He also made the crucial mistake of not securing a bridgehead on the grand canal, and the 320,000 Communist soldiers of the Eastern China Field Army under Su Yu caught up with him, and the 63rd corps under his command were wiped out of the 7th army's order of battle while trying route to cross the grand canal at Yaowan (窑湾) after finishing the rearguard duties. On the same day (November 8, 1948), as Huang continued to retreat toward Xuzhou, Communist underground members of the 3rd pacification zone suddenly revolted on the battlefield, surrendering 23,000 troops to the Communist forces. The Nationalist headquarters in Xuzhou under Liu Zhi panicked and ordered the 13th army under Lieutenant General Li Mi, which was defending the east side of Xuzhou, to retreat to back to Xuzhou. Those developments allowed the Communist forces to completely cut off Huang's 7th army from the rest of the Nationalist forces by taking Caobaji (曹八集) and Daxujia (大许家) vacated by Li Mi's 13th army. Chiang Kai-shek ordered the KMT 2nd army and 13th army to relieve the 7th army; But Lieutenant General Qiu Qingquan, commander of the 2nd army, was not eager to save his beleaguered colleague because of their previous feuds and feared the Communists might encircle his unit as well. Li Mi attempted but his relief efforts were beaten back by the Communist forces, despite the support of planes and tanks. After 15 days of brutal fighting, the 7th army was destroyed in Nianzhuang (碾庄) village, only 20 miles from Xuzhou. On the night of 22 November 1948, Huang Baitao committed suicide after he successfully broke out from his army headquarters with his deputy commander of the 25th corps, who smuggled his body and personal belongings through the Communist security checkpoints. Since Huang Baitao was one of the few KMT army commanders who chose death rather than being taken prisoner by the Communists, President Chiang Kai-shek personally arranged a state funeral for him. The Nationalist Government posthumously promoted him to four-star general and awarded him with his second Order of Blue Sky and White Sun. When the People's Liberation Army approached on Nanjing in the summer of 1949, the survivors of the 7th army transferred his remains to Taiwan.
