= Order of Blue Sky and White Sun =

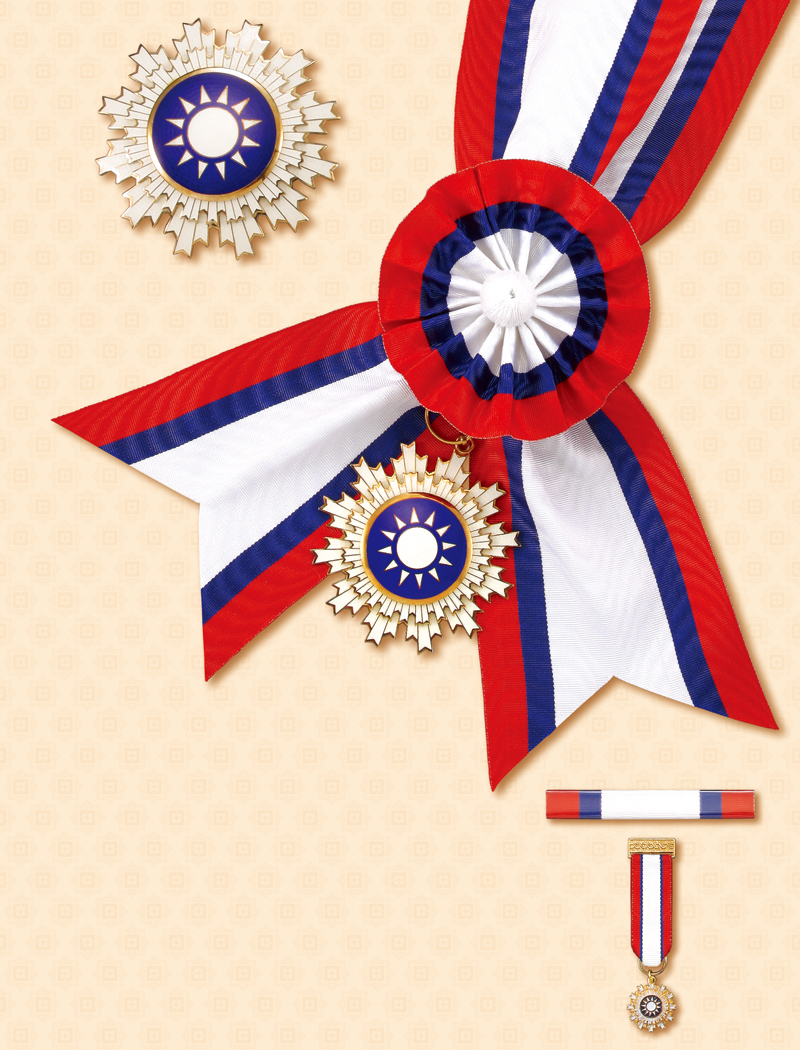
- Order of Blue Sky and White Sun without the Grand Cordon
- Type: Single-grade Grand Cordon
- Awarded for: Outstanding contributions to national defense
- Presented by: the Republic of China
- Eligibility: Military personnel only
- Status: Last awarded 2020
- Established: 15 May 1929
- First award: 1930
- Final award: 3 January 2020

Highlights
- Total: 209
- Total awarded posthumously: 1
- Total recipients: 210
- Ribbon of the Order of the Blue Sky and White Sun

Precedence
- Next (higher): Order of National Glory
- Next (lower): Order of Precious Tripod

The Order of Blue Sky and White Sun with Grand Cordon (Chinese:青天白日勳章 or 青天白日勛章) is the Republic of China's second highest military award. Created in 1929, it is awarded for "outstanding contributions to national security under foreign invasion" and is second only to the Order of National Glory. The name and the design come from the Blue Sky with a White Sun symbol of the Republic of China and the Kuomintang.

Unlike many other ROC medals, Order of Blue Sky and White Sun comes only as a first-class medal, without varying degrees of commendation; since 1981, it has been presented with the Grand Cordon, a very large ribbon, in this case, a white ribbon with red and blue edges. Before that, it came with a plain ribbon that is the smaller version of the modern grand cordon.

== Notable recipients ==
- Albert C. Wedemeyer, for his role in reorganizing the training of the Chinese army.
- Chen Qingkun (陳慶堃), for his leading role in the Breakout of Yangtze River 長江突圍 during the civil war in 1949 in which he successfully got away from Communist forces after his admiral surrendered to the Communists.
- Chiang Chung-ling former Minister of Defense
- Claire Lee Chennault, for his aid in defending China during World War II
- Gao Youxin, one of China's top ace-fighter pilots during the Second Sino-Japanese War-Second World War
- Huang Baitao, for his campaign in Henan in 1948
- Hu Lien, Hu commanded 11th Division and defended western Hubei. This was easiest route to capture China's capital Chungking for the Japanese army, but Hu fought gallantly and deflected the Japanese.
- Xie Jinyuan, for his defense of Sihang Warehouse in Shanghai during early part World War II
- Zhang Zizhong, one of the highest-ranked Allied officers killed in action in World War II
- General Shen Yi-ming, killed when a Black Hawk crashed alongside 7 other personnel. He was serving as the Chief of the General Staff of the Republic of China Armed Forces at the time of his death. (posthumously awarded)
- Xue Yue 薛岳 for his role in fighting Japanese forces in Changsha, Hunan.

== See also ==
- Recipients of the Order of Blue Sky and White Sun with Wikipedia biographies.
