= March 1942 =

Month of 1942

<<	March 1942					>>
Su	Mo	Tu	We	Th	Fr	Sa
1	2	3	4	5	6	7
8	9	10	11	12	13	14
15	16	17	18	19	20	21
22	23	24	25	26	27	28
29	30	31

The following events occurred in March 1942:

== March 1, 1942 (Sunday) ==
- The Second Battle of the Java Sea was fought, resulting in Japanese victory. The cruiser HMS Exeter and the destroyers HMS Encounter and USS Pope were sunk.
- The Battle of Sunda Strait ended in Japanese victory. The Allies lost 1 heavy cruiser, 1 light cruiser and 1 destroyer while the Japanese lost 1 minelayer and 4 troopships sunk or grounded.
- Construction of the Sobibór extermination camp began.
- Near Christmas Island, the fuel tanker USS Pecos was bombed and sunk by Aichi D3A dive bombers, while the American destroyer USS Edsall was bombed and damaged by Japanese aircraft and then shelled and sunk by the battleships Hiei and Kirishima.
- The Dutch steamship Roseboom was torpedoed and sunk west of Sumatra by the Japanese submarine I-159.
- German submarine U-656 was depth charged and sunk off Cape Race, Newfoundland by an American Lockheed Hudson.
- Died: George S. Rentz, 59, United States Navy chaplain (killed in action); Cornelius Vanderbilt III, 68, American military officer, inventor, engineer and yachtsman

== March 2, 1942 (Monday) ==
- The Japanese began heavy air strikes on New Guinea in preparation for an invasion.
- Australia declared war on Thailand.
- Ships at Surabaya in the Dutch East Indies were scuttled to keep them from being captured by the Japanese.
- The American destroyer Pillsbury was shelled and sunk west of Christmas Island by the Japanese cruisers Atago and Takao.
- Born:
  - John Irving, novelist and screenwriter, in Exeter, New Hampshire;
  - Claude Larose, ice hockey player, in Hearst, Ontario, Canada;
  - Lou Reed, musician, in Brooklyn, New York (d. 2013)
- Died: Charlie Christian, 25, American swing and jazz guitarist (tuberculosis)

== March 3, 1942 (Tuesday) ==
- The Battle of Pegu, concerning the defence of Rangoon, began.
- Attack on Broome: Japanese fighter planes attacked the town of Broome, Western Australia and killed 88 people.
- KNILM Douglas DC-3 shootdown: A Douglas DC-3 airliner was shot down over Australia by Japanese warplanes, resulting in the deaths of four passengers and the loss of diamonds worth an estimated A£ 150,000–300,000. The diamonds were presumably looted from the crash site but their fate remains a mystery.
- The American gunboat Asheville was sunk south of Java by the Japanese destroyers Arashi and Nowaki.
- An exhibition titled "Artists in Exile" opened at the Pierre Matisse Gallery in New York. Fourteen artists including Marc Chagall, Max Ernst, Fernand Léger and Piet Mondrian were represented at the exhibition with one piece each.
- German submarine U-92 was commissioned.
- Died: Prince Amedeo, Duke of Aosta, 43, Italian prince (died in a POW camp in Nairobi)

== March 4, 1942 (Wednesday) ==
- The Japanese conducted Operation K, a reconnaissance of Pearl Harbor and disruption of repair and salvage operations there. Two Kawanishi H8K flying boats were dispatched but failed to see much due to heavy clouds and only did negligible bombing damage.
- The Sook Ching massacre ended in Singapore. Official Japanese statistics show fewer than 5,000 killed while the Singaporean Chinese community claims the numbers to be around 100,000.
- The British sloop Yarra was sunk in the Indian Ocean by Japanese cruisers.

== March 5, 1942 (Thursday) ==
- Japanese forces entered Batavia, the capital of the Dutch East Indies.
- German submarines U-462 and U-612 were commissioned.
- Born: Felipe González, Prime Minister of Spain, in Seville, Spain
- Died: Grand Duke Dmitri Pavlovich of Russia, 50, Russian royal

== March 6, 1942 (Friday) ==
- Elements of the Japanese 2nd Infantry Division on Java entered Buitenzorg, while Dutch forces withdrew toward Bandung.
- Romania broke off diplomatic relations with Brazil.
- A controversial political cartoon by Philip Zec appeared in the Daily Mirror, depicting a merchant seaman clinging to the remains of a ship in rough seas with the caption, "The price of petrol has been increased by one penny – Official." Winston Churchill interpreted the cartoon as "defeatist" and considered taking action to ban the Daily Mirror from publication.

== March 7, 1942 (Saturday) ==
- The Battle of Pegu ended in a Japanese victory.
- The first class of five African-American Tuskegee Airmen graduated.
- Netherlands Indies Radio went off the air with the final message, "Goodbye till better times. Long live the Queen!"
- German submarines U-179 and U-211 were commissioned.
- Born:
  - Michael Eisner, businessman and CEO of the Walt Disney Company, in Mount Kisco, New York;
  - Tammy Faye Messner, evangelist, singer and television personality, in International Falls, Minnesota (d. 2007)
- Died: Pierre Semard, 55, French communist leader (executed)

== March 8, 1942 (Sunday) ==
- The Japanese Invasion of Salamaua–Lae began.
- Japanese forces entered Rangoon.
- The British and U.S. governments extended loans of £50 million and $500 million, respectively, to the Nationalist Chinese government.
- The Dutch minesweeper Jan van Amstel was sunk by a Japanese destroyer in the Madura Strait with heavy loss of life.
- Jacques Maritain gave the annual Aquinas Lecture at Marquette University.
- Born: Dick Allen, baseball player, in Wampum, Pennsylvania (d. 2020)
- Died: José Raúl Capablanca, 53, Cuban chess player

== March 9, 1942 (Monday) ==
- The Dutch East Indies campaign ended in a Japanese victory. The Japanese occupation of the Dutch East Indies began.
- The Battle of Borneo ended as Japanese forces captured Pangkalan Bun on the same day that the airfield at Samarinda formally surrendered.
- The Japanese began the Invasion of Buka and Bougainville in the South Pacific.
- Vannevar Bush delivered a report to President Roosevelt expressing optimism on the possibility of producing an atomic bomb.
- Slovak authorities required all Jews to wear the yellow badge.
- Miklós Kállay became Prime Minister of Hungary.
- Ali Soheili became Prime Minister of Iran.
- Born:
  - Pedro Bandeira, children's author, in Santos, São Paulo, Brazil;
  - John Cale, musician, composer and record producer, in Garnant, Wales;
  - Bert Campaneris, baseball player, in Pueblo Nuevo, Cuba

== March 10, 1942 (Tuesday) ==
- The Johns Hopkins Applied Physics Laboratory was founded.
- The Japanese captured the port of Finschhafen, New Guinea.
- Lend-Lease was granted to Iran.
- Died: Julia Britton Hooks, 89, American musician and educator

== March 11, 1942 (Wednesday) ==
- Douglas MacArthur's escape from the Philippines began.
- The British light cruiser Naiad was torpedoed and sunk south of Crete by German submarine U-565.
- Brazilian President Getúlio Vargas by decree reiterated his powers to declare war or a state of national emergency, clearing the way for the seizure of subjects and property of Axis countries.

== March 12, 1942 (Thursday) ==
- The Battle of Java ended in Japanese victory.
- The U.K. Ministry of War Production was renamed the Ministry of Production and Oliver Lyttelton was appointed its new head.
- Brothers Anthony and William Esposito were executed by electric chair five minutes apart at Sing Sing for the January 14, 1941 slaying of a police officer and a holdup victim, which had led to a sensational trial in which they feigned insanity. Both brothers were in such fragile health that they had to be brought into the death chamber in wheelchairs because they had refused all food for the past 10 months that was not fed them forcibly.
- The American cargo ship Texan was torpedoed, shelled and sunk by German submarine U-126.
- German submarine U-613 was commissioned.
- Born:
  - Ratko Mladić, Bosnian Serb military leader, in Božanovići, Independent State of Croatia;
  - Jimmy Wynn, baseball player, in Hamilton, Ohio (d. 2020)
- Died:
  - William Henry Bragg, 79, British physicist, chemist and Nobel laureate;
  - Robert Bosch, 80, German industrialist, engineer and inventor;
  - Enric Morera i Viura, 76, Spanish musician and composer

== March 13, 1942 (Friday) ==
- The Japanese completed the Invasion of Salamaua–Lae.
- The Canadian Women's Army Corps was integrated into the Canadian Army.
- The musical comedy film Song of the Islands starring Betty Grable and Victor Mature was released.
- Born:
  - Dave Cutler, software engineer, in Lansing, Michigan;
  - Mahmoud Darwish, poet and author, in al-Birwa, Mandatory Palestine (d. 2008);
  - George Negus, author, journalist and television presenter, in Brisbane, Australia; (d. 2024)
  - Scatman John, musician, in El Monte, California (d. 1999)
- Died: Žikica Jovanović Španac, 27 or 28, Yugoslav partisan (killed in battle)

== March 14, 1942 (Saturday) ==
- U.S. President Franklin D. Roosevelt sent a proposal to all 48 state governors that speed limits throughout the nation be reduced to 40 miles per hour (64 km/h) to conserve rubber.
- German submarine U-133 sank off the Greek island of Salamis after striking a naval mine.
- German submarines U-177 and U-260 were commissioned.
- Died: René Bull, 69, British illustrator and photographer

== March 15, 1942 (Sunday) ==
- Nazi occupying forces and local collaborationists committed the First Dünamünde Action in the Biķernieki forest near Riga, massacring about 1,900 people.
- German submarine U-503 was depth charged and sunk off Newfoundland by a Lockheed Hudson.
- The British destroyer Vortigern was torpedoed and sunk off Cromer by the German E-boat S-104.
- While sailing from Norfolk, Virginia to Beaumont, Texas, the United States Navy tanker Olean was torpedoed and heavily damaged by the German submarine U-158. The ship was abandoned, towed to Hampton Roads and repaired.

== March 16, 1942 (Monday) ==
- A tornado outbreak struck a large area of the Central and Southern United States. 153 people were killed over the next two days.
- Members of the far-right Swiss National Front were sentenced to long prison terms for propagandistic activities.
- German submarine U-706 was commissioned.
- Born: James Soong, Chinese-born Taiwanese politician, in Xiangtan

== March 17, 1942 (Tuesday) ==
- Bełżec extermination camp became operational in occupied Poland.
- Douglas MacArthur arrived in Australia and was appointed commander of the combined Allied forces in the southwest Pacific.
- The British government announced the introduction of fuel rationing.
- The British motor tanker San Demetrio was torpedoed and sunk in the Atlantic Ocean near Cape Charles, Virginia by German submarine U-404.
- Born: John Wayne Gacy, serial killer, in Chicago, Illinois (d. 1994)

== March 18, 1942 (Wednesday) ==
- The Battle of Yunnan-Burma Road had its first clash when the two-day Battle of Tachiao began.
- President Roosevelt signed Executive Order 9102, ordering the creation of the War Relocation Authority.
- German submarine U-411 was commissioned.
- The Cecil B. DeMille-directed adventure film Reap the Wild Wind starring Ray Milland and John Wayne was released.

== March 19, 1942 (Thursday) ==
- The Battle of Tachiao ended when the Japanese captured Pyu.
- The Battle of Toungoo began.
- The American tanker Papoose was torpedoed and sunk 15 nautical miles southeast of Cape Lookout, North Carolina by German submarine U-124.
- German submarine U-614 was commissioned.
- Died: José Díaz, 46, Spanish communist politician (died in Tbilisi, Georgian SSR of apparent suicide)

== March 20, 1942 (Friday) ==
- The Battle of Oktwin in the Burma Campaign began.
- When reporters met the train of General Douglas MacArthur north of Adelaide, Australia, he declared: "The President of the United States ordered me to break through the Japanese lines and proceed from Corregidor to Australia for the purpose, as I understand it, of organizing the American offensive against Japan, a primary object of which is the relief of the Philippines. I came through and I shall return."
- The British destroyer Heythrop was torpedoed northeast of Bardia by German submarine U-652. She was towed by the destroyer Eridge towards Tobruk but foundered five hours later.

== March 21, 1942 (Saturday) ==
- The last British cavalry charge in history occurred when about 60 Sikh sowars of the Burma Frontier Force attacked Japanese infantry at Taungoo. Most were killed.
- German submarines U-442 and U-517 were commissioned.
- The spy film Secret Agent of Japan starring Preston Foster premiered at the Globe Theatre in New York City. It was the first film to include the attack on Pearl Harbor as part of the plot.
- Born: Ali Abdullah Saleh, 1st President of Yemen, in Al-Ahmar, Yemen (d. 2017)
- Died:
  - J. S. Woodsworth, 67, Canadian politician;
  - Václav Morávek, 37, Czechoslovak Brigadier General and national hero (killed in a gunfight with the Gestapo)

== March 22, 1942 (Sunday) ==
- Second Battle of Sirte, the escorting warships of a British convoy to Malta held off a much more powerful Regia Marina (Italian Navy) squadron.
- Allied forces abandoned the Magwe airfield in Burma, 100 miles (160 km) east of Akyab.
- Cripps' mission: The British government sent Stafford Cripps to India to disclose the British constitutional proposals for a postwar India. Britain promised self-government for India after the war in exchange for their co-operation in the war effort.
- The BBC began transmitting news bulletins in Morse Code for the benefit of resistance fighters in occupied Europe.
- The Manzanar Japanese-American internment camp first opened.

== March 23, 1942 (Monday) ==
- The Japanese occupation of the Andaman Islands began.
- The British tanker British Prudence was torpedoed and sunk in the Atlantic Ocean by the German submarine U-754.
- Hitler issued Directive No. 40, pertaining to the command organization of the Atlantic Wall.
- German submarine U-166 was commissioned.
- Born: Walter Rodney, historian, political activist and scholar, in British Guiana (d. 1980)
- Died:
  - Marcelo Torcuato de Alvear, 73, 20th President of Argentina
  - Franz Walter Stahlecker, 41, commander of Einsatzgruppe A, killed by Soviet partisans

== March 24, 1942 (Tuesday) ==
- The Battle of Oktwin ended when the Chinese fell back to the main defensive line at Toungoo.
- The British destroyer Southwold sank off Malta after hitting a naval mine.
- German submarine U-655 was rammed and sunk in the Barents Sea by the minesweeper HMS Sharpshooter.
- The romantic drama film To the Shores of Tripoli starring John Payne, Maureen O'Hara and Randolph Scott had its world premiere in San Diego, California.

== March 25, 1942 (Wednesday) ==
- British destroyer Jaguar was torpedoed and sunk in the Mediterranean Sea off Sidi Barrani by German submarine U-652.
- British destroyer Legion and submarine P39 were bombed and sunk in the Grand Harbor, Valletta, Malta.
- The White House Communications Agency was formed.
- Holocaust in Slovakia: The first mass transport of Jews to Auschwitz concentration camp departed from Poprad railway station in the Slovak Republic, consisting of 997 young women.
- Born: Aretha Franklin, soul singer, in Memphis, Tennessee (d. 2018)

== March 26, 1942 (Thursday) ==
- The Battle of Suursaari began on the frozen Gulf of Finland between Finnish and Soviet forces.
- The Second Dünamünde Action massacred another 1,840 people near Riga.
- The Nazis began the deportation of Jews to Auschwitz concentration camp with the transport of 1,000 single women from Slovakia via Poprad transit camp. This was also the first deportation of Slovak Jews; of the 57,000 deported in 1942 only a few hundred survived the Holocaust.
- The Germans launched Operation Bamberg, an anti-partisan operation in occupied Belarus.
- Police in Rio de Janeiro announced that they had smashed a Nazi spy ring with the arrest of 200 operatives.
- The ruling Wafd Party won parliamentary elections in Egypt.
- German submarines U-337 and U-615 was commissioned.
- The USS Atik was torpedoed and sunk in action by U-123, all hands on board the Q-ship were lost.
- The tanker SS Dixie Arrow was torpedoed off Cape Hatteras by U-71
- Born: Erica Jong, author and teacher, in New York City

== March 27, 1942 (Friday) ==
- For French Jews, deportations began when the first convoy left Paris for Auschwitz.
- The Australian government imposed a state of emergency over the northern portion of the continent.
- The Action of 27 March 1942 was fought in the Atlantic Ocean. German submarine U-123 sank the American Q-ship USS Atik.
- German submarine U-587 was depth charged and sunk in the Atlantic Ocean by British warships.
- Joe Louis knocked out Abe Simon in the sixth round at Madison Square Garden to retain the World Heavyweight Boxing Championship.
- The Italian merchant steamship Oreste, sailing from Split to Bar, struck a mine around 10:00 local time near Jaz and sank.
- Born:
  - John Sulston, biologist, in Cambridge, England (d. 2018);
  - Michael York, actor, in Fulmer, Buckinghamshire, England
- Died:
  - Julio González, 65, Spanish sculptor;
  - John W. Wilcox, Jr., 60, American admiral (lost overboard in stormy weather)

== March 28, 1942 (Saturday) ==
- The Japanese completed the invasion of Sumatra.
- Bombing of Lübeck: The port city of Lübeck was the first German city attacked in substantial numbers by the Royal Air Force. The night attack caused a firestorm that caused severe damage to the historic centre and led to the retaliatory Baedeker raids on historic British cities.
- The British conducted the St Nazaire Raid on the heavily defended Normandie dry dock at Saint-Nazaire in German-occupied France. All British objectives were achieved although 169 were killed and 215 taken prisoner. The destroyer HMS Campelltown was expended as a floating bomb.
- The Panamanian cargo ship Howick Hall of convoy PQ 13 was bombed and sunk in the Barents Sea by Junkers Ju 88 aircraft.
- German submarine U-261 was commissioned.
- Stanford beat Dartmouth 53–38 in the NCAA Men's Division I Basketball Tournament Final.
- Born:
  - Daniel Dennett, philosopher, writer and cognitive scientist, in Boston, Massachusetts; (d. 2024)
  - Neil Kinnock, politician, in Tredegar, Wales;
  - Mike Newell, film director and producer, in St Albans, Hertfordshire, England;
  - Conrad Schumann, East German border guard, in Zschochau, Saxony, Germany (d. 1998);
  - Jerry Sloan, basketball player and coach, in McLeansboro, Illinois (d. 2020)
- Died: Pompiliu Ștefu, 31, Romanian typographer, communist activist and anti-fascist militant (executed)

== March 29, 1942 (Sunday) ==
- The Battle of Toungoo ended in Japanese victory.
- Stafford Cripps met with Mahatma Gandhi in New Delhi and presented his plan for postwar independence for India.
- The British cargo ship Hertford was torpedoed and sunk south of Halifax, Nova Scotia by German submarine U-571.
- German destroyer Z26 was shelled and sunk in the Barents Sea by British cruiser Trinidad and destroyer Eclipse.
- The Hukbalahap Rebellion began when former Hukbalahap soldiers rebelled against the Philippine government. The rebellion would not end until 1954.
- Following a coup d'état, the Free Republic of Nias was proclaimed by a group of freed Nazi German prisoners in the Indonesian island of Nias. The republic existed for less than a month until the island was fully occupied by Japanese troops.
- Born:
  - Kenichi Ogata, voice actor, in Tagawa District, Fukuoka, Japan;
  - Scott Wilson, actor, in Thomasville, Georgia (d. 2018)
- Died: Yogbir Singh Kansakar, 56, Nepalese poet and social reformer

== March 30, 1942 (Monday) ==
- As a result of the collapse of American-British-Dutch-Australian Command (ABDACOM), the US Joint Chiefs of Staff assumed responsibility for control of Allied forces in the Pacific; these were divided into several supreme commands, including Pacific Ocean Areas (POA), under Admiral Chester Nimitz and South West Pacific Area (SWPA), under General Douglas MacArthur.
- German submarine U-585 struck a naval mine and sank in the Barents Sea.
- The exclusion of Japanese-American internees began in Bainbridge Island, Washington.
- Born: Ruben Kun, President of Nauru, in Nauru (d. 2014)

== March 31, 1942 (Tuesday) ==
- The Japanese began the Indian Ocean raid.
- The Battle of Christmas Island was fought. Japanese soldiers were able to occupy Christmas Island without resistance, although the American submarine Seawolf damaged the Japanese cruiser Naka.
- Allied convoy PQ 13 reached Murmansk despite fierce German attacks.
- German submarine U-353 was commissioned.
