= Development of Chinese armoured forces (1927–1945) =

This article deals with the chronology and development of Chinese armoured forces from 1927 to 1945.

== Introduction ==
The Chinese warlord Zhang Zuolin introduced tanks to China. Surprised during the Northern Expedition by Chiang Kai-shek's National Revolutionary Army, he bought several Renault FT tanks armed with 37 mm guns from France in 1927. It is uncertain how these tanks were used in combat, but they were eventually captured by the Japanese and the Chinese Nationalists. The tanks captured by the Japanese army were deployed in the Kwantung Army and later used during the Mukden Incident. The Nationalists in the meantime also bought 36 FTs. However, they saw no action but were used mainly for training. Also about 6 or 10 Renault UE light armoured carriers armed with Browning MG were bought in France.

== Additions ==
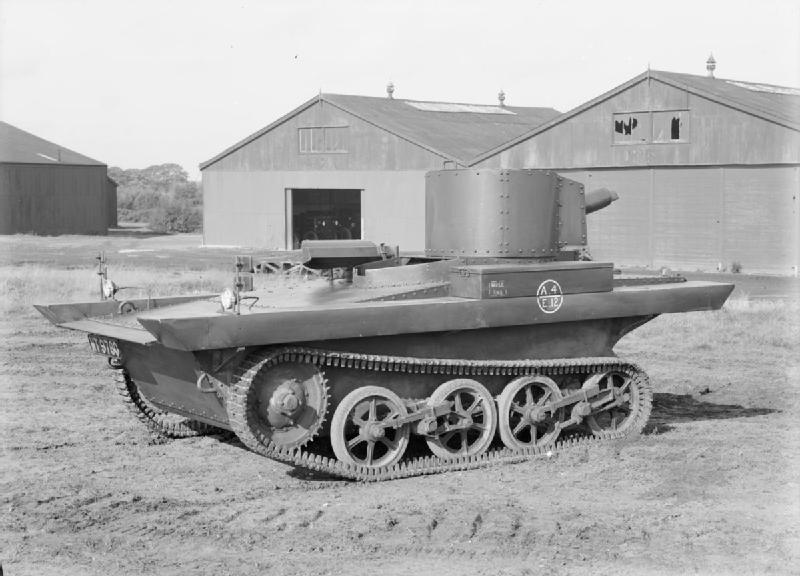
Vickers A4E12 amphibious tank.

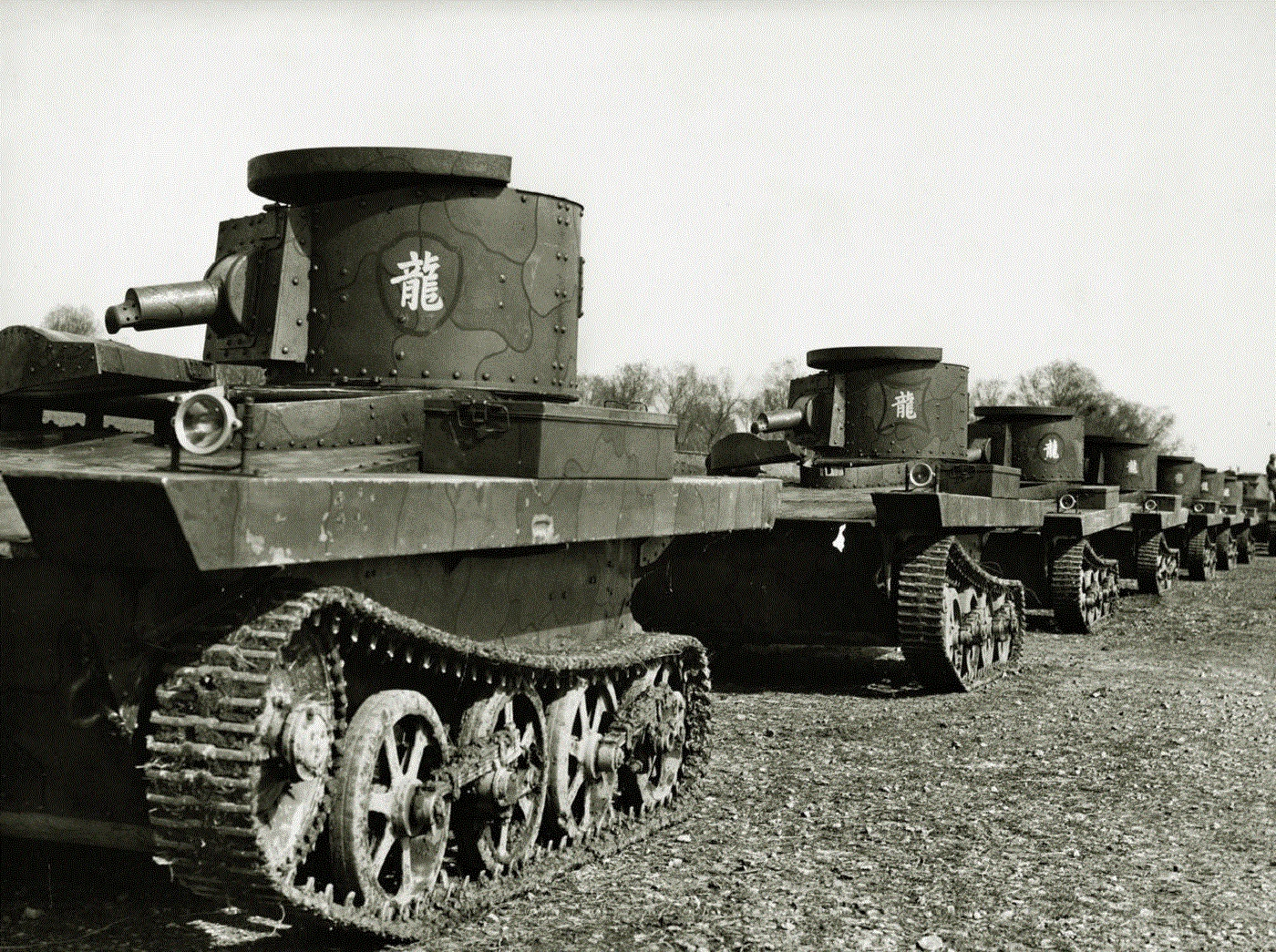
Vickers Carden Lloyd A4E12 amphibious tanks.

At the beginning of the war in 1937 the armour were organized in three armoured battalions, equipped with tanks and armoured cars from various countries. When the Second Sino-Japanese War broke out in earnest, the 1st and 2nd Armored Battalions participated in the Second Battle of Shanghai and the Battle of Nanking and were more or less completely destroyed by the Japanese forces. Many of the tanks were captured by the Japanese. By 1938 nearly half of China's armor was either captured or destroyed as out of the 96 tanks they started with, only 48 remained. China, at that time, had German advisors, but these were withdrawn as German relations with Japan warmed. In early 1938, the Japanese government had demanded that the German government withdraw all German advisers from China. Given the closer relations between the two nations, Hitler agreed and soon after they left China.

After the Germans left, the Soviet Union started to support the Nationalists. The National Revolutionary Army facing Japanese forces had only the small number of armoured vehicles and mechanised troops formed into the three armoured battalions to defend a large front. In August 1937, Chiang Kai-shek's government negotiated with the Soviet government for military aid for the War of China's Resistance Against Japan (1937–1945) during a signing of a Treaty of Non-Aggression between the Republic of China and the Soviet Union. The Soviets came in and began to provide Soviet advisers and Soviet tanks arrived in China for the first time in March 1938. After these battalions were mostly destroyed in the Battle of Shanghai and Battle of Nanjing, new tanks, armoured cars and trucks from the Soviet Union and Italy made it possible to create the only mechanized division in the army. The Soviet advisers organized the new mechanised unit in China, the 200th Division, which consisted of one tank regiment and one motorised infantry regiment.

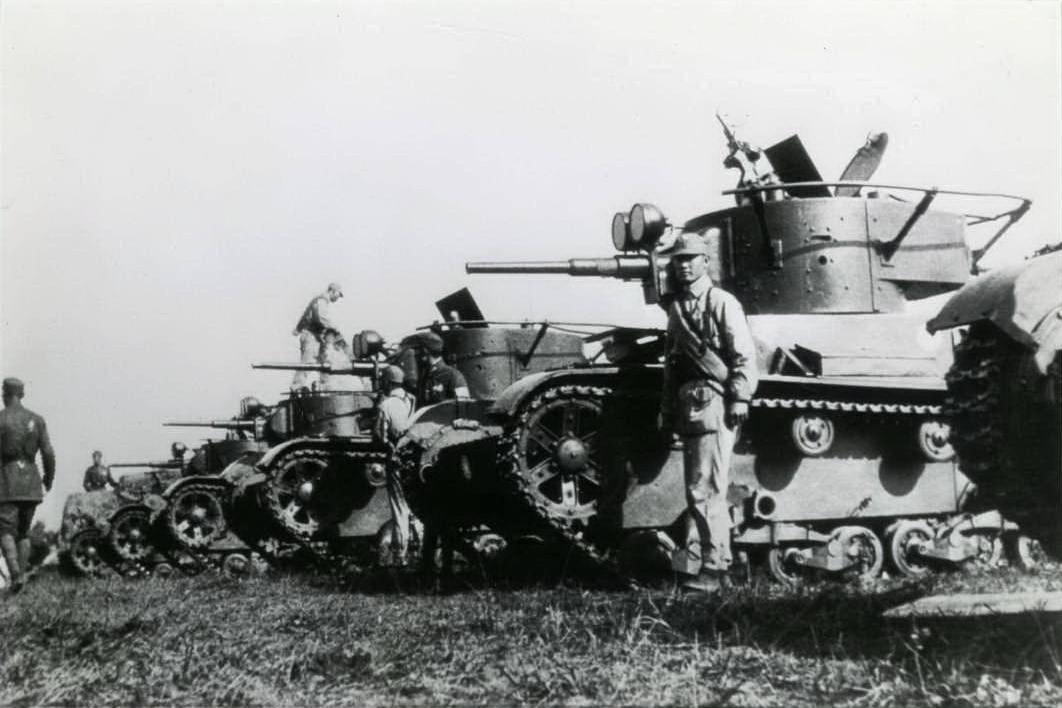
T-26 tanks of Chinese Nationalist Army during WW2

The USSR sold 82 T-26 mod. 1933 tanks to China as Russia was wary of having Japan on its back door. These tanks were shipped to Guangzhou harbour in the spring of 1938, and used to set up the first tank regiment of the 200th Infantry Division of the Chinese National Revolutionary Army, the only motorized infantry formation in the Chinese Army at that time. The 200th Infantry Division was a mechanized division consisting of four regiments, including a tank regiment equipped with the T-26s, an armoured car regiment, a mechanized infantry regiment, and an artillery regiment.

Chinese tank crews were trained under the supervision of Soviet specialists. The 200th Division was set up as the first mechanised division in the National Revolutionary Army by General Du Yuming, who was also its first commander. The tank regiments had 70 T-26, 4 BT-5, 20 ( 92? ) CV-35 tanks. The armoured car regiment had around 50 BA armoured cars and 12 ( 18? ) Leichter Panzerspähwagen (Sd.Kfz. 221) armoured cars. The tank regiment consisted of four tank battalions. Each tank battalion had three tank companies. The tank regiments had approximately 200 armoured fighting vehicles (AFVs). The Nationalist government bought 88 T-26 tanks and BA-10 and BA-20 armoured cars. These AFVs and remaining German AFVs were deployed in the 200th Division and the division finally saw action in late 1938. Its first action was against the 14th Division in the Battle of Lanfeng. Following the division's combat in the Battle of Lanfeng and in operations afterward until September 1938 the division's original subordinate mechanized units were placed under direct command of the 11th Army, and the division was reorganized. It inflicted the devastating defeat upon the Japanese army at the Battle of Kunlun Pass. It suffered heavy losses after the battle at Kunlun Pass in an offensive against Batang, losing nearly two thirds of its strength and was rebuilt and reorganized. After the Soviet–Japanese Neutrality Pact was signed, this help from the Soviets went out the window and China started searching for allies. After signing the Molotov–Ribbentrop Pact with Germany and defeating the Kwantung Army at Khalkin Gol, Russia started to withdraw its help from China.

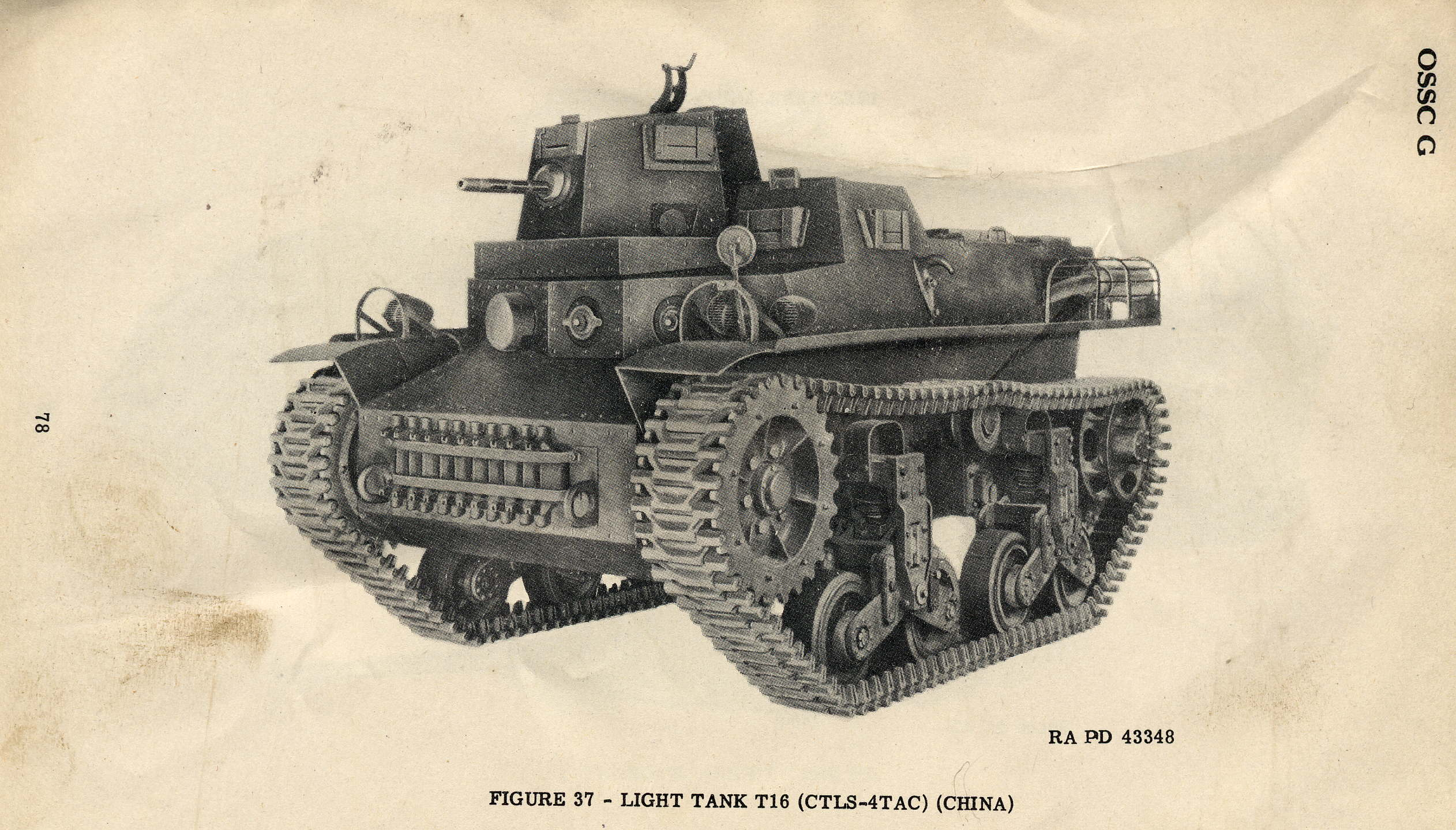
T16 light tank

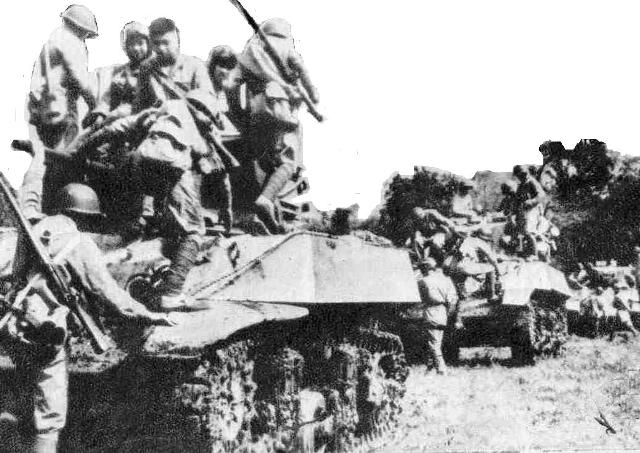
Chinese troops on Stuart tanks

Soon relations were made with the USA who only slowly began to (officially) provide help and even more when America entered the war. More than 600 of the T16 CTMS tanks were supposed to be delivered to China under Lend-Lease after Pearl Harbor, the logistical difficulty and its obsolete design compelled the Chinese to reject the offer. Later 233 U.S. M2A4 light tanks were acquired by the Nationalists along with some 48 M3A3, M5A1 Stuart tanks in Lend/Lease from the US in 1943, and 35 M4A4 Sherman tanks were acquired under the United States Military Assistance Program between 1943 and 1944.

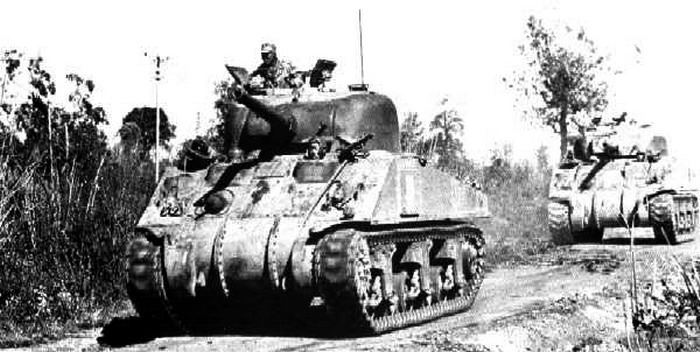
M4 Shermans.

Upon the American entry into the war in 1941, it began to supply China with AFVs which the Soviets were unable to provide. M3 Stuarts and M4 Shermans trickled in through Burma and formed part of the several well-equipped, well-trained armies that the Nationalists could deploy. These units were responsible for stopping numerous Japanese attacks during the later phases of the war.

The 200th Division also saw action in the Burma Theatre under Joseph Stilwell; it participated in the Battle of Yunnan-Burma Road in 1942 in the Burma campaign. The 200th Division distinguished itself in fighting in the Battle of Toungoo, and Battle of Hopong – Taunggyi but then suffered a disastrous defeat in the Battle of Hsipaw-Mogok Highway near the end of the campaign as it was attempting to retreat to China. After World War II, the remaining Chinese T-26 tanks equipped the First Armoured Regiment of the Army of the Chinese Kuomintang government, which saw service in East China during the Chinese Civil War (1946–1950) where several T-26 tanks were destroyed or captured by the People's Liberation Army during the Huaihai Campaign in 1949.

== See also ==
- Development of Chinese Nationalist air force (1937-1945)
- Tanks in China
