= Battle of Kokang =

1942 Japanese attempt to invade Kokang

Defense of Kokang
- Part of Japanese invasion of Burma and the Burma campaign in the South-East Asian theatre of World War II
| Date | August 1942 |
| Location | Kokang, British Burma, |
| Result | Han Chinese Kokang victory |

Belligerents
| Republic of China: (Republic of China (1912–1949)) Chiefdom of Kokang | (Empire of Japan) Japan: Azad Hind |

Commanders and leaders
| (Republic of China (1912–1949)) Yang Wenbing 楊文炳 | (Empire of Japan) |

Strength
| Kokang self defense force (under the Chinese Expeditionary Force 11th Army Group) of 1,500 men | 6,000 Japanese |

Casualties and losses
| 1 Kokang killed, 4 or 5 ROC troops killed in the first Kokang surprise attack. Chinese Expeditionary Force : 93rd Division in the Shan State and Yunnan border : From April to December 1942 : 1,466 dead; In 1943 : 903 dead | 80 Japanese killed in the first Kokang surprise attack against a Japanese advanced invasion party. 1,000 Japanese killed in total in their failed attempt to attack Kokang |

The Defense of Kokang was the failed Japanese attempt to invade and occupy Kokang.

== Background ==
Kokang was a Han Chinese ruled and populated chiefdom (Tusi) founded by a member of the Ming dynasty imperial guard at Nanjing in the 17th-18th centuries which came under British Burma in 1897 after a border agreement between the Qing dynasty and Britain.

== Battle ==
Kokang Self-Defence Force under the command of the 11th Army Group of the Chinese Expeditionary Force. They killed 80 Japanese and Shan in an ambush attack on a temple and defeated the attempted Japanese invasion of Kokang.

Japan never managed to occupy Kokang unlike the rest of British Burma which it occupied.

== See also ==
- Yenangyaung
- Battle of Toungoo
- Chinese Army in India
- New 1st Army
- Du Yuming
- Sun Liren
- National Revolutionary Army

== Sources ==
- Hsu Long-hsuen and Chang Ming-kai, History of The Sino-Japanese War (1937–1945), 2nd Ed., 1971. Translated by Wen Ha-hsiung, Chung Wu Publishing; 33, 140th Lane, Tung-hwa Street, Taipei, Taiwan Republic of China. Pg. 377
- Slim, William (1956). Defeat into Victory. London: Cassell. ISBN 0-304-29114-5.
