= Battle of the Yunnan–Burma Road =

1942 military campaign of World Ward II

Battle of Yunnan-Burma Road
- Part of the Second Sino-Japanese War, the China Burma India Theater of World War II
Date	March 18 – July 12, 1942 (3 months, 3 weeks and 3 days)
Location	Burma and Yunnan province in the Republic of China 21°N 97°E
Result	Axis victory

Belligerents
Axis: (Empire of Japan) Japan; Thailand	Allies: (Republic of China (1912–1949)) China; United Kingdom; Air Support: United States

Commanders and leaders
(Empire of Japan) Shōjirō Iida: Shozo Sakurai; Masao Watanabe; (Empire of Japan) Takeshi Koga; (Empire of Japan) Yūzō Matsuyama; (Empire of Japan) Yutaka Hiroshi; (Thailand) C.R. Seriroengrit	(Taiwan) Luo Zhuoying: (Republic of China (1912–1949)) Sun Li Jen; (Republic of China (1912–1949)) Liu Fangwu; (Republic of China (1912–1949)) Dai Anlan †; (Republic of China (1912–1949)) Liao Yaoxiang; (United Kingdom) James Scott; (United Kingdom) David Tennant Cowan; (United Kingdom) John Anstice; (United Kingdom) William Slim; (United States) Joseph Stilwell; (United States) Claire Lee Chennault

Units involved
33rd Division: 55th Division; 56th Division; Phayap Army	(Republic of China (1912–1949)) 5th corps: 6th corps; 66th corps

Strength
3 divisions: ~65,000	(Republic of China (1912–1949)); Western Claim : 95,000; Chinese Claim : 103,000

Casualties and losses
Unknown	(Republic of China (1912–1949)) (Note: Mostly not including losses during the retreat into China and India; Not including the losses of the New 29th Division; The number of deaths from diseases were reported only by the New 38th Division) : 13,071 killed 7,971 wounded 9,586 missing 145 killed or wounded 130 dead from diseases

Battle of Yunnan-Burma Road (18 March – 24 May 1942; Chinese: 滇緬路戰役) was the name of the Chinese intervention to aid their British allies in the 1942 Burma Campaign. Its forces were composed of the Fifth, Sixth and Sixty-sixth Army under the command of the Chinese Expeditionary Force in Burma, commanded by Lt. General Joseph Stilwell, Lt. General Luo Zhuoying was his executive officer.

In February 1942, General Lo Cho-ying directed 5th Army to move from western Yunnan to the vicinity of Toungoo and further south in Burma. Advanced elements of the 200th Division of 5th Army arrived at Toungoo on March 8, 1942, and took over defensive positions from the British forces. The 6th Army was directed to move from Kunming to the Burma–Thai border. Its leading elements reached Mawchi, Mong Pan and Mong Ton in mid March. The 66th Army later arrived in Lashio and Mandalay as a reserve and to assist the British forces in their operations.

== Battles of the Yunnan-Burma Road Campaign ==
- Battle of Tachiao March 18–19, 1942
- Battle of Oktwin March 20–23, 1942, in vicinity of Oktwin
- Battle of Toungoo March 24–30, 1942, in and around Taungoo
- Battle of Yedashe April 5–8, 1942, in vicinity of Yedashe
- Battle of Szuwa River April 10–16, 1942, at Szuwa River northwest of Yedashe
- Battle of Mawchi and Bato Early April 1942, in vicinity of Mawchi
- Battle of Bawlake April 17, 1942, in vicinity of Bawlakhe
- Battle of Yenangyaung April 17–19, 1942
- Battle of Pyinmana April 17–20, 1942, in vicinity of Pyinmana
- Battle of Loikaw April 20, 1942, in vicinity of Loikaw
- Battle of Hopong-Taunggyi April 20–24, 1942, in vicinity of Hopong and Taunggyi
- Battle of Loilem April 25, 1942, in vicinity of Loilem
- Battle of Lashio April 29, 1942, in vicinity of Lashio
- Battle of Hsenwe May 1, 1942
- Battle of Salween River May 6–31, 1942
- Battle of Hsipaw-Mogok Highway May 23, 1942
- Battle of Kokang August 1942

== See also ==
- China Burma India Theater of World War II (CBI)
- The 1942 Japanese advance to the Indian frontier in the Burma Campaign
- Battle of Northern Burma and Western Yunnan
- X Force and Y Force for Chinese forces which fought in the Burma Campaign

== Sources ==
- Hsu Long-hsuen and Chang Ming-kai, History of The Sino-Japanese War (1937–1945), 2nd Ed., 1971. Translated by Wen Ha-hsiung, Chung Wu Publishing; 33, 140th Lane, Tung-hwa Street, Taipei, Taiwan Republic of China.
- Jon Latimer, Burma: The Forgotten War, London: John Murray, 2004.
- Orbat of the Chinese Expeditionary Force in Burma – 1942
- Japanese forces in Burma, The 1942 Campaign
- 中国抗日战争正面战场作战记 (China's Anti-Japanese War Combat Operations)
  - Author: Guo Rugui, editor-in-chief Huang Yuzhang
  - Press: Jiangsu People's Publishing House
  - Date published: 2005-07-01
  - ISBN 7-214-03034-9
  - 第八部分: 太平洋战争爆发后的中国抗战中国远征军入缅援英作战 1 (The Chinese Expeditionary Force enters Burma to help England to fight)
