= Mo Furu =

- Born: 1906 Gaozhou, Guangdong, Qing Dynasty
- Died: 1990 (aged 83–84) United States?
- Allegiance: National Revolutionary Army, Republic of China Army
- Rank: Lieutenant General
- Battles / wars: Second Sino-Japanese War Battle of Shanghai Battle of Nanjing Battle of Kunlun Pass; Chinese Civil War

Mo Furu (Chinese: 莫福如; pinyin: Mò Fúrú; 1906–1990) was a Kuomintang major-general from Guangdong and a subordinate of Chen Jitang.

== Military career ==
In 1924 he was made platoon commander in the Guangdong Army and later company commander with the rank of major. In 1930, he was promoted to commander of the 1st Regiment of the National Revolutionary Army 4th Army, 2nd Division. Later he was made deputy brigade commander of the 480th Brigade of the NRA 66th Army, 160th Division and later, as a major-general, deputy commander of the 160th Division. In March 1940, after the transfer of the 160th Division to the NRA 65th Army, he was promoted to divisional commander. In December 1949, he was promoted to commander of the 63rd Army.

In April 1950, after the fall of the island of Hainan to the People's Liberation Army, he fled to Taiwan. In Taiwan, he was appointed commander of the 1st Division of the ROC Army. In 1956 he emigrated to the United States.
