= Battle of Prome (1942) =

Coordinates: 18°49′N 95°13′E

- Part of the Japanese invasion of Burma of World War II
Date	30 March – 2 April 1942
Location	Prome, Burma (present-day Pyay, Myanmar)
Result	Japanese victory

Belligerents
British Empire: British Burma; British Raj	Empire of Japan

The Battle of Prome took place during the Japanese conquest of Burma. China's Generalissimo, Chiang Kai-shek, believed "As long as the British hold Prome, we hold Toungoo."

== Background ==
Japan invaded Burma in December 1941. First, the city of Tavoy's airfield was bombed by the Japanese. Shortly afterward, the Japanese invaded Victoria's Point, and slowly started to build up forces. On 14 January 1942, Japanese forces advanced into Burma.

After the loss at Toungoo, the remaining allies split the land up, and each defended their own city. The British Raj and British Burma got Prome, while Chinese forces went to the nearby Shwedaung.

== The battle ==
After a victory at Shwedaung, the Japanese started firing at Prome on the night of 30 March. Despite British forces inflicting significant casualties, they withdrew to Allanmyo on 2 April.
