= Memorial Hall of the Chinese Expeditionary Force =

- 中國遠徵軍紀念館
- Location: Toungoo, Bago Region, Myanmar
- Dedicated to: Chinese Expeditionary Force

The Memorial Hall of the Chinese Expeditionary Force (Chinese: 中國遠徵軍紀念館), also known as the Chinese Expeditionary Force Memorial Hall, is a memorial hall dedicated to the Chinese Expeditionary Force located in Toungoo, Bago Region, Myanmar.

== Monument ==
In 1951, the descendants of the Chinese Expeditionary Force and the overseas Chinese in Myanmar built a Chinese Expeditionary Force monument in Toungoo, which was moved to its current location in 1997. Later, due to years of disrepair, cracks appeared on the monument. Based on the suggestions of the descendants and the local Chinese, the Chinese Embassy rebuilt the monument and the memorial hall, and preserved the main body of the old monument. In March 2019, the newly renovated Chinese Expeditionary Force Monument and Memorial Hall were officially unveiled and opened for public.

The newly renovated monument is 9.7 meters high.
