= Battle of Tachiao =

Coordinates: 18.31149°N 96.50476°E

- Part of the Japanese invasion of Burma, the Burma campaign, the South-East Asian theatre of World War II, the Second Sino-Japanese War, the China Burma India Theater and the Pacific Theater of World War II
Date	March 18–19, 1942 (1 day)
Location	Pyu town in Burma
Result	Japanese victory

Belligerents
Republic of China	Empire of Japan

Commanders and leaders
(Republic of China (1912–1949)) Dai Anlan	(Empire of Japan) Tadashi Hanaya

Units involved
200th Division: Cavalry Regiment (minus two companies); 1st Company, 598th Infantry Regiment	55th Division: 143rd Regiment

Casualties and losses
Chinese Claim : Initial ambush : not reported. Battle at the south bank of Pyu : several dozen casualties.	Chinese Claim : Initial ambush : 30+ killed; 20 rifles, 2 machine guns, and 19 motorbikes captured; Battle at the south bank of Pyu : approximately 200 killed or wounded.

The Battle of Tachiao (March 18–19, 1942), was the first clash in the Battle of Yunnan-Burma Road in the Burma Campaign of World War II and Second Sino-Japanese War.

Advanced elements of the 200th Division arrived at Toungoo on March 8, 1942 and took over defensive positions from the British forces. The city of Toungoo itself would be the main defensive position of the Chinese forces, with an outpost a few kilometers to the south at Oktwin. Major-General Dai Anlan the divisional commander, sent the Motorized Cavalry Regiment and 1st Company, 598th Infantry Regiment to the banks of the Kan River 35 miles south of Toungoo and 12 miles south of the town of Pyu. The cavalry regiment plus a company of infantry pushed up to Kan River, with a platoon of cyclists taking up positions at the bridge over the river.

At first light on March 18, the 55th Division's commander, Tadashi Hanaya, sent about 200 Japanese reconnaissance troops from the division's 143rd Regiment to advance right up to the bridge on motorbikes. Upon reaching the outposts, they were ambushed by the Chinese troops hiding along the sides of the road. Chinese armoured cars joined the attack and after three hours of fighting the Japanese fell back, leaving some 30 dead behind together with some twenty rifles, two light machine guns and some 19 motorbikes. After night fell, the Japanese continued their attacks with small units, and the Chinese covering force fell back toward their line at Oktwin. Following up the next day, Pyu fell to the Japanese on the 19th.

== See also ==
- Battle of Oktwin
