= General Nakamura =

General Nakamura may refer to:

- Aketo Nakamura (1889–1966), Imperial Japanese Army lieutenant general
- Kōtarō Nakamura (1881–1947), Imperial Japanese Army general
- Masao Nakamura (1892–1939), Imperial Japanese Army major general
