= Luo Zhuoying =

Chinese general (1896–1961)

- 羅卓英
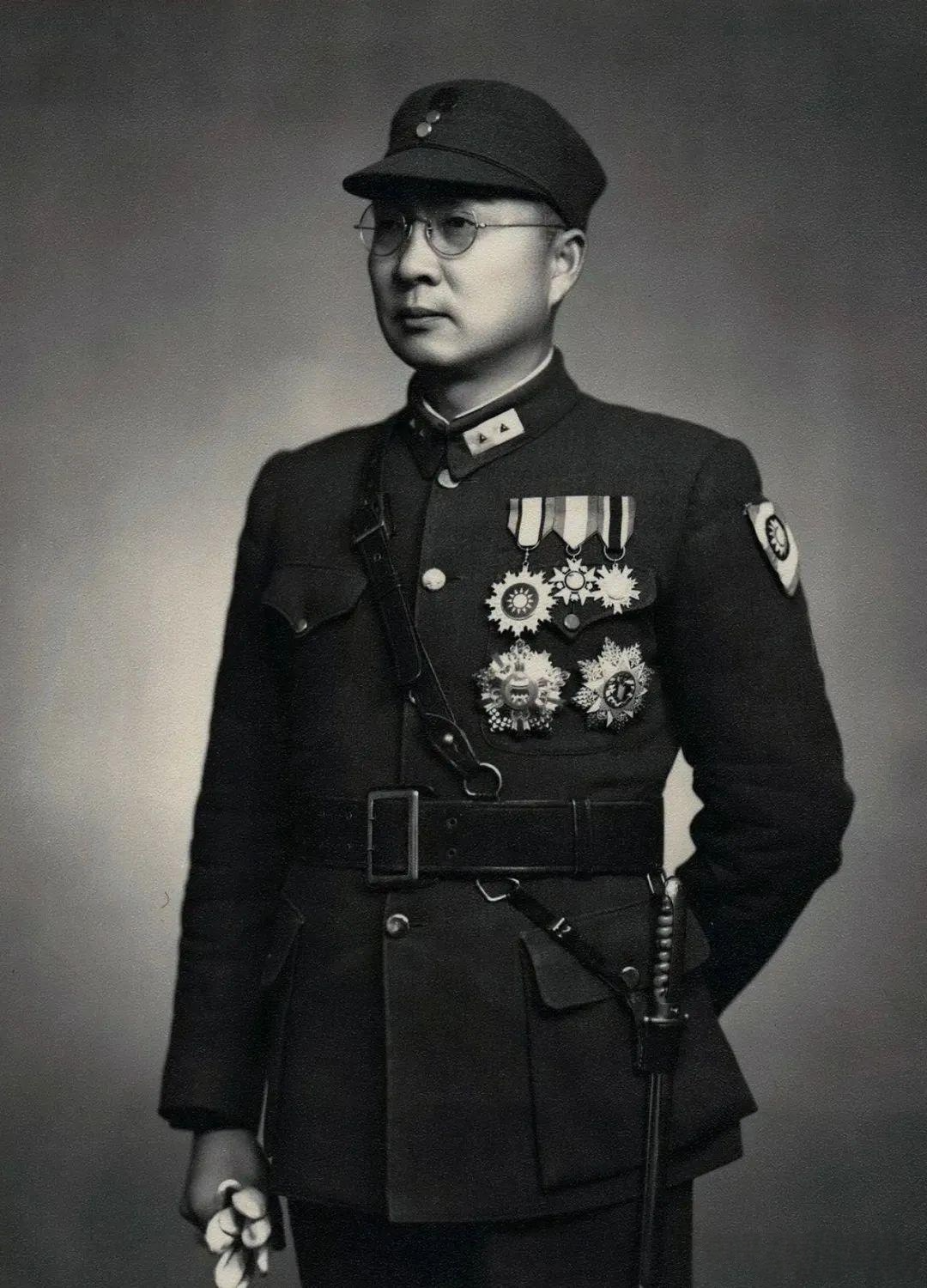
- Born: 19 March 1896; Dabu County, Guangdong, Qing China
- Died: 6 November 1961 (aged 65); Taipei, Taiwan
- Military career
- Allegiance: Republic of China
- Branch: (Republic of China (1912–1949)) National Revolutionary Army
- Rank: General (二級上將)
- Commands: 18th Corps; 16th Corps; 15th Army Group; 19th Army Group; 25th Army Group
- Conflicts: Northern Expedition; Second Sino-Japanese War; Battle of Shanghai; Battle of Nanking; Battle of Wuhan; Battle of Nanchang; First Battle of Changsha; 1939–1940 Winter Offensive; Battle of Shanggao; Second Battle of Changsha; Third Battle of Changsha; South-East Asian theatre of World War II; Burma campaign; Battle of the Yunnan–Burma Road

Luo Zhuoying (traditional Chinese: 羅卓英; simplified Chinese: 罗卓英; pinyin: Luó Zhuóyīng; Wade–Giles: Lo Cho-ying; 19 March 1896 – 6 November 1961) was a Republic of China general during the Second Sino-Japanese War who served as a commander in the Chinese Expeditionary Force during the Burma campaign and later the governor of Guangdong following World War II.

== Biography ==
Luo was born in Dabu County, Guangdong in 1896. He entered the Baoding Military Academy in 1918. After graduating in 1922, he returned to his hometown to teach. He joined the National Revolutionary Army in 1924 and participated in the Northern Expedition. After the end of the Northern Expedition, Luo became the commander of the 11th Division and became acquainted with Chen Cheng.

In 1933, Luo became commander of the 5th Army and deputy commander of the 18th Army, and was sent to Jiangxi to participate in the Chinese Civil War. He was promoted to lieutenant general and became commander of the 18th Division in 1935.

After the beginning of the Second Sino-Japanese War, Luo served as the commander of the 16th Corps, the commander-in-chief of the 15th Army Group, the commander-in-chief of the 19th Army Group, and participated in the Battle of Shanghai, the Battle of Nanking, the Battle of Wuhan and the 1939–40 Winter Offensive.

In 1942, Luo Zhuoying became the commander-in-chief of the Chinese Expeditionary Force and led the force in assisting the Allied defense against the Japanese invasion of Burma. After the Allied forces were expelled from Burma in 1942, Luo led the withdrawal to British India. While in India, he oversaw the training of the Chinese forces there. He became deputy commander-in-chief of the 3rd War Zone in 1943.

Luo served as governor of Guangdong from 1945 to 1947. He was then sent to Northeast China to take up a position, but the large communist presence there meant the political situation was unstable. He later went to Taiwan to serve as an advisor to the Presidential Office.

In 1961, Luo died of diabetes in Taipei at the age of 65.
