= Battle of Oktwin =

Battle

Coordinates: 18.82897°N 96.405258°E

- Part of the Burma campaign (Second Sino-Japanese War and World War II)
Date	March 20–23, 1942
Location	Oktwin, Burma
Result	Japanese victory

Belligerents
China	Japan

Commanders and leaders
Dai Anlan	Unknown

Units involved
5th Army Cavalry Regiment; 200th Division: 1st Battalion, 600th Regiment; 1st Battalion, 598th Regiment	55th Division: 143rd Regiment; 112th Regiment

The Battle of Oktwin was the second battle in the Battle of Yunnan-Burma Road in the Burma campaign of World War II and Second Sino-Japanese War.

On March 20, the Japanese 143rd Regiment plus cavalry units of the 55th Division attacked the positions of the Chinese 5th Army Cavalry Regiment north of the Kan River, driving the Chinese forces back with heavy losses. The bulk of the cavalry regiment was withdrawn to the north of Toungoo, leaving only a company of cavalry and infantry each to delay the advancing Japanese. Meanwhile, the commanding general of 200th Division, Dai Anlan's fortifications at Oktwin and around Toungoo were now ready. They were built using timber, which was in abundant supply, and all positions were carefully concealed. On March 21, Japanese forces brushed aside the delaying forces and reached the 200th Division outposts at Oktwin.

The 112th Regiment of the 55th Division attacked 200th Division positions at first light on March 22, but made little headway. Japanese forces attacking the Chinese positions consisted of a battalion of infantry with several guns; the defenders were the 1st Battalion, 600th Regiment. The Japanese sent cavalry forces around the left flank of the Chinese and the position was stabilized only when reserve forces of the 1st Battalion, 598th Regiment were committed immediately in counterattacks.

The Japanese were now more careful after the ambush, and used their artillery and machine guns to fire at suspected positions before sending their infantry forward. Light machine guns were positioned up among the trees and caused many Chinese casualties. Eventually the Chinese set up their heavy machine guns to fire at an angle to deal with this menace. By the end of the day, the Chinese Army had suffered casualties amounting to more than 10 officers and 200 soldiers.

On March 23, the Japanese attacked again on the left flank with strong artillery and air support. The battle continued until 4 pm without much success for the attackers, who then tried another flanking move with a company of infantry and scores of cavalry troops around the right side of the Chinese positions. The Chinese held their ground until nightfall and fell back to the main defensive line at Toungoo on March 24.

== See also ==
- Battle of Toungoo
