= Chinese Expeditionary Force =

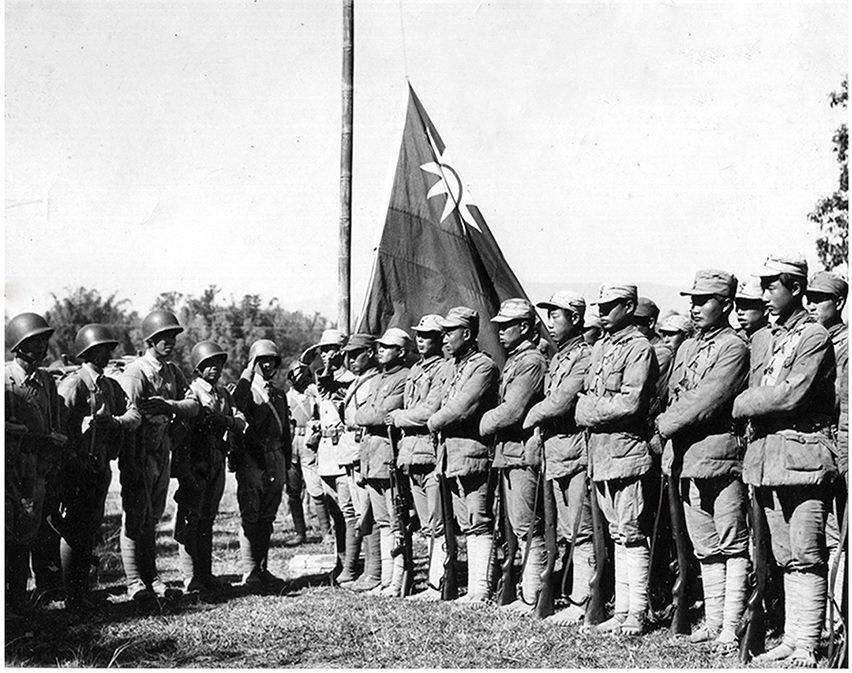
- Reunion of the Chinese Expeditionary Force and the Chinese Army in India (X Force and Y Force).
- Active: 1942–1945
- Disbanded: 1945
- Country: China
- Branch: National Revolutionary Army Ground Forces
- Type: Expeditionary Force
- Role: Close-quarters combat Combined arms Expeditionary warfare Forward observer Jungle warfare Mountain warfare Raiding; Urban warfare
- Engagements: World War II

Commanders
- Notable commanders: Sun Li-jen; Du Yuming; Joseph Stilwell; Wei Lihuang; Zheng Dongguo; Dai Anlan; Song Xilian; Luo Zhuoying; Liao Yaoxiang; Liu Fangwu

The Chinese Expeditionary Force (traditional Chinese: 中國遠征軍; simplified Chinese: 中国远征军) was an expeditionary unit of China's National Revolutionary Army that was dispatched to Burma and India in support of the Allied efforts against the Imperial Japanese Army during the Japanese invasion and occupation of Burma in the South-East Asian theatre of the Second World War.

== Background ==
In July 1937, the Empire of Japan launched a full-scale invasion of China, and soon isolated the country from the rest of the world. The Chinese resistance led by Nationalist leader Chiang Kai-shek in Chongqing was heavily dependent on the supply line through the Burma Road, which reopened in October 1940. The United States was shipping materials to support Chinese resistance by late 1941 as part of the Lend-Lease policy. To cut off the Chinese supply line, the Imperial Japanese Army began to plan the invasion of Burma. From 1942 to 1944, 98 percent of all US lend lease to China went directly to US Army units in China, not the Chinese military.

In December 1941, the surprise attack on Pearl Harbor by the Empire of Japan was immediately followed by the invasion of British colonies of Malaya and Burma. The Second Sino-Japanese War consequently merged with the Second World War, and the China-Burma-India theatre was established with increasing American support. The British Empire, however, was preoccupied with the war in the European theatre, and was unable to divert any resources to protect their colonial interests, in particular over British India. To secure Chinese participation in Burma against the Japanese, Britain and China signed a joint agreement in December 1941 concerning the mutual defense of the Burma Road. This agreement led to the creation of the Sino-British alliance and the Chinese Expeditionary Force.

== First expedition (March – August 1942) ==
The Japanese invasion of Burma began in January 1942, and Japan conducted a series of air raids over Rangoon, where the headquarters of the Burma Corps of the British Indian Army was located. To relieve Allied positions in Burma, the Chinese Expeditionary Force (CEF) was formed from the Fifth Army and the New Sixth Army, under the command of American Lieutenant General Joseph Stilwell. The CEF entered Burma in February 1942 and engaged with the Imperial Japanese Army at the Toungoo. Stilwell arrived at the front on March 22, and the Chinese 200th Division held for twelve days against overpowering Japanese forces before retreating. The setbacks against the Japanese Army escalated the tension between Stilwell and Chiang, as many Chinese commanders refused to carry out orders from Stilwell without approval from Chiang first. The Japanese soon captured Rangoon in March and advanced toward the Burma Road. The 1st Burma Division of the British Indian Army were encircled by the Japanese at the oil fields in the Battle of Yenangyaung on April 18, and the 38th Division led by Lieutenant General Sun Li-jen attempted to relieve them.

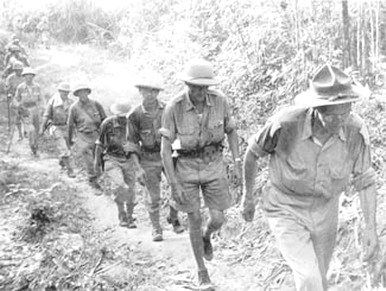
Stilwell retreating from Burma to India, May 1942.

The Allied forces led by the British decided to evacuate from Burma after Lashio fell to the Japanese on April 29. In response, Stilwell ordered a general retreat to India. The majority of the Fifth Army, led by Du Yuming, however attempted to retreat to Yunnan through primitive forests in Northern Burma. The units were decimated by Japanese ambush along with malaria and dysentery, suffering major losses. The failure of the first expedition led to the closure of the Burma Road, and future Chinese war efforts had to rely on the Hump and the construction of the Ledo Road for logistical support.

== Second expedition (Early 1943 – March 1945) ==
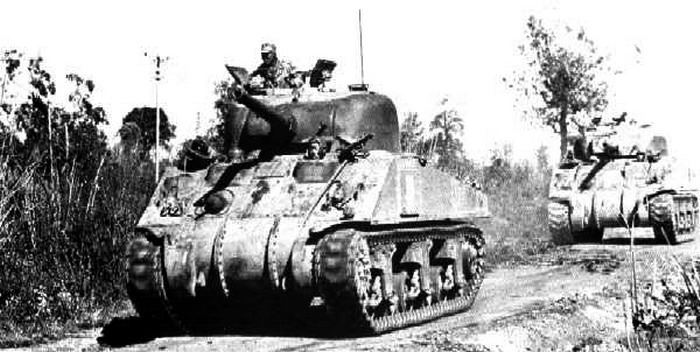
Chinese M4A4 Sherman

Between 1942 and 1943, many Chinese soldiers were airlifted from Chongqing to India and joined the ones who had followed the British retreat there earlier, they were trained under American advisors and became the X Force into which the New 1st Army and New 6th Army was incorporated, which was supported by American Special Forces in their field operations. For most of 1943, the Chinese Army engaged in several conflicts with the Japanese Army while defending the construction of the Ledo Road. In October 1943, the New First Army managed to defeat the Japanese veteran 18th Division at Hukawng Valley. To secure the opening of the Ledo Road, the Chinese Army in India was retitled the "Northern Combat Area Command" (NCAC), and re-entered Burma in the spring of 1944. The Chinese Army engaged and defeated the Japanese forces during various campaigns in Northern Burma and Western Yunnan and recaptured Myitkyina in August. Allied success in these campaigns enabled the opening of the Ledo Road. However, by the time Myitkyina was captured, Allied success in the Pacific theatre was reducing the significance of the China-Burma-India theatre.

Intending to coordinate with the X Force, Wei Lihuang's Chinese Expeditionary Force in Yunnan, known as the Y Force, crossed the Salween River in April and launched an offensive against the Japanese Army. Y Force was composed of two Army Groups from the National Army; 11th Army Group (Commander Song Xilian, Deputy Commander Huang Jie, Chief of Staff Cheng Gang, a general of the National Revolutionary Army) and 20th Army Group (Commander Huo Kuizhang, Deputy Commander Fang Tian). By January 1945, the Y Force had captured the town of Wanting on the China-Burma border and regained control of the land route from Burma to China. The first convoy via the newly opened Ledo-Burma Road reached Kunming in February 1945.

== Aftermath ==
After returning to China, the American-equipped New First Army and the New Sixth Army fought in the Chinese Civil War. Both were decimated by the Communist forces during the Liaoshen campaign in Northeast China, and ceased to exist. A memorial for fallen Chinese soldiers from the Chinese Expeditionary Force was built in Tengchong, Yunnan.
