= Masao Nakamura =

Japanese military leader

- 中村 正雄
- Born: May 15, 1892; Ishikawa, Japan
- Died: December 25, 1939 (aged 47); Guangxi Province, China
- Military career
- Allegiance: Empire of Japan
- Branch: Imperial Japanese Army
- Service years: 1913 -1939
- Rank: Major General
- Conflicts: Second Sino-Japanese War; Battle of Kunlun Pass †

Masao Nakamura (中村 正雄, Nakamura Masao; 15 May 1892 – 25 December 1939) was a major general in the Imperial Japanese Army in the Second Sino-Japanese War.

A native of Ishikawa Prefecture, Nakamura graduated from the 25th class of the Imperial Japanese Army Academy in 1913 and from the 32nd class of the Army Staff College in 1920. He was assigned as a military attaché to France from 1924 to 1927 and later served as a resident officer in Italy from 1933-1934.

From 1936-1938, Nakamura served as Chief of Staff of the IJA 12th Division. He was promoted to major general in 1939 and commanded the IJA 21st Infantry Brigade of the 5th Division during the Battle of South Guangxi in 1939. During the battle, his brigade was mauled, and Nakamura was killed in action at the Battle of Kunlun Pass. He was posthumously promoted to lieutenant general.
