= Battle of Toungoo =

1942 WWII battle in Burma

Coordinates: 18.9333°N 96.4333°E

- Part of the Japanese invasion of Burma, the Burma campaign, the South-East Asian theatre of World War II, the Second Sino-Japanese War, the China Burma India Theater and the Pacific Theater of World War II
Date	March 24–30, 1942 (6 days)
Location	Toungoo city in Burma
Result	Japanese victory

Commanders and leaders
(Republic of China (1912–1949)) Dai Anlan (Republic of China (1912–1949)) Liao Yaoxiang	(Empire of Japan) Takeshi Koga (Empire of Japan) Yūzō Matsuyama (Empire of Japan) Yutaka Hiroshi

Strength
200th Division	55th Division; Reconnaissance Regiment of the 56th Division

Casualties and losses
Chinese claim : 8 officers and 1,897 warrant officers, NCOs, and soldiers killed 28 officers and 414 warrant officers, NCOs, and soldiers wounded Japanese claim : Reconnaissance Regiment's claim : approximately 500 killed.	55th Division : unknown Reconnaissance Regiment of the 56th Division : 10 killed, 35 wounded.

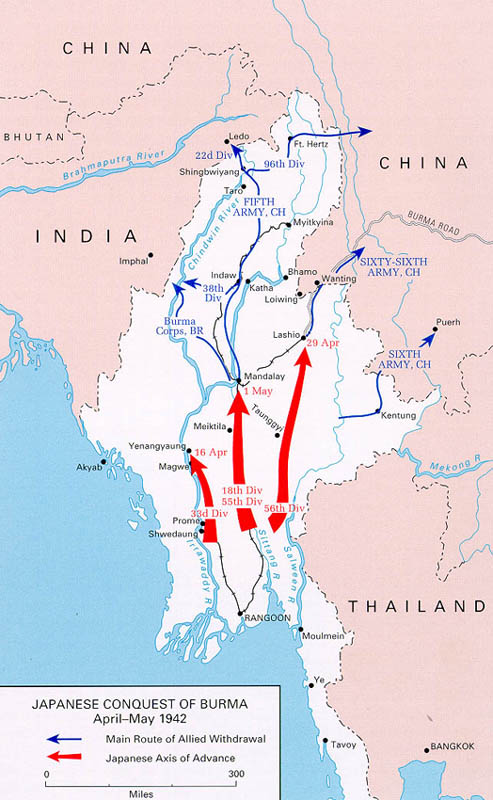
Japanese Conquest of Burma, April-May 1942.

The Battle of Toungoo was one of the key battles in the Battle of Yunnan-Burma Road in the Burma Campaign of World War II and Second Sino-Japanese War. The failure of the Chinese to hold the city of Toungoo opened up the route for the Japanese to make their lunge to Lashio around the allied flank and into the Chinese rear.

== Prelude ==
On March 8, 1942, advanced elements of the 200th Division arrived at Toungoo on the same day Rangoon fell. The Chinese took over the defense of this key location from a small detachment of British forces. Toungoo controlled the road north toward Mandalay and the bridge over the Sittang River that carried the road east to the Karenni States and north to Loikaw, the Shan States, Lashio and the Chinese province of Yunnan. Capture of the city could threaten the flank of the Allied defensive line in Burma and open the way to a Japanese advance into Central Burma.

Major-General Dai Anlan the divisional commander, decided the city of Toungoo itself would be the main defensive position of the Chinese forces, with an outpost line to the south at Oktwin. He sent the Motorized Cavalry Regiment and 1st Company, 598th Infantry Regiment to the banks of the Kan River 35 miles south of Toungoo and 12 miles south of Pyu. The cavalry regiment plus a company of infantry pushed up to Kan River, with a platoon of cyclists taking up position near the bridge at the village of Nyaungchidauk. They were to delay the advance of the Japanese until the defenses at Toungoo were complete.

Meanwhile, the 200th Division began digging in within the old city walls and at the advanced line at Oktwin. Toungoo city itself was divided into the new town to the east of the railway and the old town to the west. The old town had a well preserved ditch and fortified wall which provided a good defensive position for the Chinese. The Chinese then enhanced their defenses with carefully concealed positions built using an abundant supply of local timber. To make things more difficult for the attackers the land around Toungoo was flat and featureless, except for the Sittang River to the east.

Ten days later on March 18 the first skirmish with the leading elements of the Japanese 55th Division, began on the Kan River at Nyaungchidauk. Falling back over the next three days, the Chinese cavalry delayed the Japanese advance while the Chinese completed their defenses at Oktwin and Toungoo. When the Japanese attacked Oktwin they were held for another two days by determined Chinese resistance.

== The Battle of Toungoo ==
=== Opening moves ===
On 24 March, the Japanese 112th Regiment made frontal attacks on the Oktwin positions. The 143rd Regiment, with the aid of friendly local Burmese, used the cover of the jungle and wooded area to the west of the city to advance six kilometers to the north and attack Toungoo airfield and a nearby rail station. It was defended by only an engineer battalion, whose commander withdrew in a panic. This cut the 200th Division's communications to the north, and left it encircled on three sides.

Dai Anlan abandoned the outlying positions to concentrate his defense near the city walls of Toungoo. 598th Regiment held the northern part of the Toungoo defense, 599th Regiment held the south of the city, and 600th Regiment defended the west. Divisional Headquarters moved from the city to the eastern bank of the Sittang to avoid Japanese air and artillery attacks, and also to safeguard the remaining supply route to the east. Part of a Replacement Regiment which had arrived the previous day was posted on the eastern bank of the Sittang River, to extend the positions to cover the supply line as well as the divisional HQ.

=== Attack on the City ===
At 0800, on March 25 the Japanese launched an all out attack against all three sides of the city, with the 143rd Regiment on the left, the 112th Regiment on the right, and the Cavalry Regiment plus a company of infantry attacking along the Sittang River. The objective was to press the Chinese forces against the Sittang where they would be annihilated. Despite local penetrations in the north-western part of the defensive perimeter, heavy Chinese resistance prevented the Japanese making major progress until 2200 when Japanese troops infiltrated Chinese positions in the north-western part of the Toungoo citadel, soon followed by a full battalion.

The Chinese reinforced the 600th Regiment with the 2nd Battalion, 598th Regiment and counter-attacked. There was heavy house to house fighting and the lines between the forces were so close that Japanese air and artillery support found it difficult to avoid hitting their own men. The counterattack failed to recover the lost positions when Japanese troops made good use of the buildings and the stone walls around a local cemetery. The 600th Regiment was moved back between the other two regiments to defend Toungoo city itself. Elsewhere the bridge over River Sittang became the target for Japanese firepower and was so severely damaged that vehicles could not cross it.

Japanese attacks continued on March 26. The 112th Regiment attacked and took the south-western corner of Toungoo but was unable to make any further progress. On the left, a flanking move to attack the north-western part of Toungoo was no more successful. The Cavalry Regiment's attack was also repulsed. The Chinese launched counterattacks against the 112th and Cavalry Regiments with about 300 troops in each sector. These were repulsed, but losses were heavy and offensive strength dropped.

By the evening, the Japanese had taken the western part of the city to the west of the railroad while the Chinese troops held on to the main part of the city east of the railroad. Both sides faced each other across the railway at a distance of less than 100 meters, making it difficult for Japanese air and artillery support. Eventually the Japanese withdrew some 200 meters to allow their planes and guns to operate. During the bombardment the Chinese hid in their camouflaged positions then held their fire until the Japanese advanced and were within 40–50 meters and then opened up on them with machine guns and grenades. This happened repeatedly and by the end of the day the 200th Division had very heavy casualties, but the Japanese also suffered heavily and were finding it hard to continue the frontal attacks. The arrival of the New 22nd Division to the north of Yedashe forced the Japanese to send the 2nd Battalion, 143rd Regiment to Nangyuen as a blocking force to stop them from reaching Toungoo, greatly reducing Japanese attacking strength. The third regiment of the 55th Division, the 144th Regiment, as well as a battalion of artillery and a company of cavalry were not with the division in the Battle of Toungoo, so that the division really did not have sufficient manpower and the attack bogged down as a result.

On March 27, there was a pause in the morning, but Japanese planes came back in the afternoon and systematically bombed and strafed Chinese positions. The Japanese continued to press their attacks with this air support, and in the afternoon fired large numbers of tear gas shells. Despite all this, the Chinese held their ground. It was then decided to wait for the 3rd Field Artillery Regiment with its 15 cm howitzers to arrive to attack the Chinese positions again on March 28, which was also to be supported by air attacks.

=== New Assault ===
On March 28, the 3rd Heavy Field Artillery Regiment arrived, and with strong support from bombers and more gas attacks inflicted heavy casualties on the Chinese. The right wing of the attack managed to destroy many Chinese strongpoints with artillery support. However, the light bombers did not arrive until 1500 due to heavy fog at the airfields, and it was not possible to overcome stubborn resistance of the Chinese due to their defense in depth, even though the fighting lasted into the evening.

Meanwhile, the Reconnaissance Regiment of the Japanese 56th Division, consisting of two motorized infantry companies and a machine gun company, a field artillery company of mountain guns, and a platoon of engineers, was moving rapidly north from Rangoon in a column of 45 trucks, with a company of 6 armored cars and a total of some 404 men. It made rapid progress along the main road to Toungoo and reached divisional HQ of the 55th Division by noon on March 28. It was decided to move this force east of the Sittang River to attack the rear of the Chinese positions. Crossing at 2000 the same day, it forded the Sittang at Wagyi, a few kilometers south of the city where the water was only chest high, leaving its vehicles behind.

If the Japanese attack east of the Sittang was successful, the entire 200th Division would be encircled. The divisional commander personally organized the defence, and two companies from the 3rd Battalion of the 598th Regiment were ordered to attack the exposed left flank of the Japanese. A vicious fight continued within the city of Toungoo. Around the divisional HQ on the east bank, fighting inflicted heavy casualties on the 3rd Battalion, 599th Regiment as well as the divisional support company; but the Chinese were able to hold their ground.

On March 29, the 55th Division used its last strength to attack, supported by all available guns. By noon, the troops on the left were able to advance into the north western part of the city, and the escape route of the Chinese was threatened. Covered by the fight to the west, the Reconnaissance Regiment of the 56th Division moved north and attacked the Chinese flank guard east of the river and by midday on the 29th had overrun it. Threatening the divisional HQ of the 200th Division and the Sittang River bridge.

On the afternoon of March 29 orders came for the entire 200th Division to withdraw that evening towards the east initially, then to the north along the eastern bank of the River Sittang. Fighting in the city continued into the dark with the city on fire. The Chinese continued to resist stubbornly and no progress was made. By 2200 on March 29, 56 Division's motorized Reconnaissance Regiment had closed in on the bridge over the Sittang River and noted signs of wavering in the Chinese forces as night fell.

=== Chinese Withdrawal ===
However this was the Chinese withdrawal. Dai Anlan had each Chinese battalion leave a rearguard which launched night attacks to cover the withdrawal of the main force. The retreat was led by the 599th Regiment crossing the battered and threatened bridge, followed by the 600th Regiment and then the 598th Regiment which forded the river. By 0400 the entire 200th Division had moved out of Toungoo in good condition, taking all the wounded along. The Chinese claimed that their rearguards left before dawn.

On the morning of March 30 the 55th Division attacked all along the front claiming heavy resistance, despite withdrawal of most (if not all) of the Chinese. After engineers managed to blow up Chinese positions and strongpoints at 0850, the 55th Division troops finally broke through and linked up with the troops of the 56th Division that had seized the vital bridge over the Sittang at 0700 and then attacked Toungoo from the east. This ended the battle leaving the Japanese in possession of the city and bridge over the Sittang. The road to the east was open for the Japanese to use to outflank the allied line in Burma.

New 22nd Division sent south to support the 200th Division had meanwhile advanced as far as Nangyun railway station, and partially dislodged the Japanese II Battalion of 143 Regiment from their position there. They also sent patrols further south toward Toungoo threatening the Japanese flank and rear. The retreating 200th Division joined them at Yedashe after withdrawing northward on the east bank from Toungoo, crossing the Sittang River east of Nangyun. Subsequently, the Chinese withdrew to a new defensive positions at Yedashe, to continue to block the Japanese advance up the Sittang River Valley.

== Result ==
In battles from March 11 to April 2, 1942, the Japanese Fifteenth Army in Burma claimed 2,446 abandoned enemy corpses and 175 POWs while suffering 166 killed, 489 wounded, and 3 missing. The two major operations recorded by the Japanese during this period were the capture of Toungoo and Prome and the claimed annihilation of most of Chiang Kai-shek's 200th Division and reinforcement troops of the British 7th Armoured Brigade.

== See also ==
- Battle of Yedashe
- Battle of Mawchi and Bato
- Chinese Army in India
- Battle of Yenangyaung
- Du Yuming
- Republic of China Army
- National Revolutionary Army

== Sources ==
- [1] Hsu Long-hsuen and Chang Ming-kai, History of The Sino-Japanese War (1937–1945) 2nd Ed., 1971. Translated by Wen Ha-hsiung, Chung Wu Publishing; 33, 140th Lane, Tung-hwa Street, Taipei, Taiwan Republic of China. Pg. 376
- [2]中国抗日战争正面战场作战记 China's Anti-Japanese War Combat Operations
  - Author : Guo Rugui, editor-in-chief Huang Yuzhang
  - Press : Jiangsu People's Publishing House
  - Date published : 2005-7-1
  - ISBN 7214030349
  - 第八部分：太平洋战争爆发后的中国抗战中国远征军入缅援英作战 4 (Eighth part: The Pacific War erupts after the Sino-Japanese War Chinese Expeditionary Force enters Burma to help England to fight 4)
- [3] Yuan zheng Yin Mian kang zhan (Battles of the Expeditionary Force in India and Burma),
  - Publisher: Zhongguo wen shi chu ban she
  - Date published: Monday, January 1, 1990
  - 455 pages
  - Language: Mandarin Chinese
  - ISBN 7-5034-0153-2
  - ISBN 978-7-5034-0153-4
  - A collection of memoirs and first hand accounts by KMT officers.
- [4] Biography of Dai Anlan, by Dai Chengdong, Anhui People’s Press, 1998.
