= Yūzō Matsuyama =

- 松山 祐三
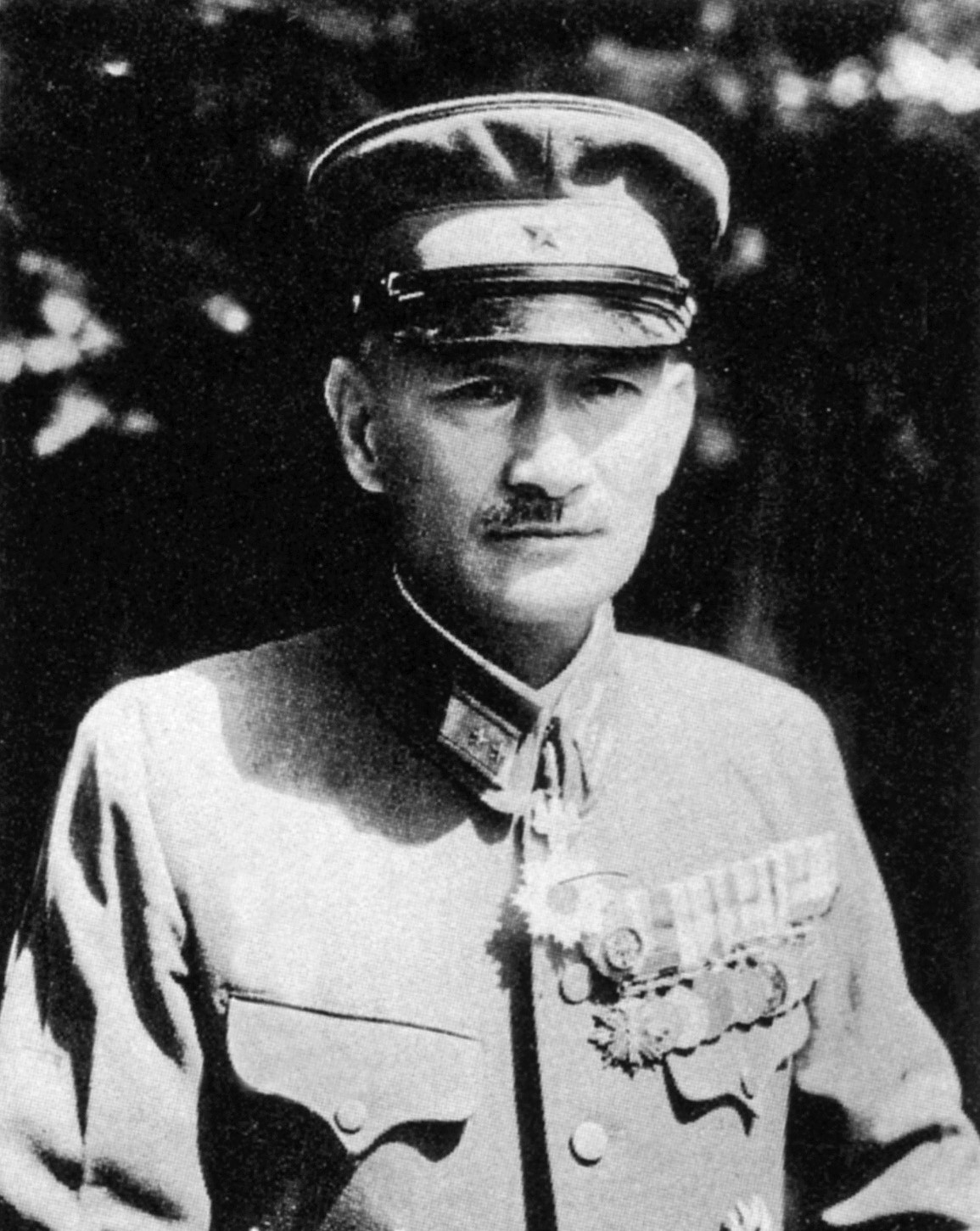
- Born: February 1, 1889; Aomori Prefecture, Japan
- Died: November 1, 1947 (aged 58)
- Education: Imperial Japanese Army Academy
- Military career
- Allegiance: Empire of Japan
- Branch: Imperial Japanese Army
- Service years: 1910–1945
- Rank: Lieutenant General
- Units: 2nd Border Defense Unit, Kwantung Army; IJA 27th Division
- Commands: 19th Independent Defense Battalion; 64th Independent Infantry Group; IJA 56th Division
- Conflicts: Second Sino-Japanese War; World War II; Burma campaign; Battle of Northern Burma and Western Yunnan

Yūzō Matsuyama (松山 祐三, Matsuyama Yūzō; February 1, 1889 – November 1, 1947), was a lieutenant general in the Imperial Japanese Army during the Second Sino-Japanese War and World War II.

== Biography ==
Matsuyama was a native of Aomori Prefecture and a graduate of the 22nd class of the Imperial Japanese Army Academy in 1910.

From 1937 to 1938, Matsuyama was commanding officer of the 19th Independent Defense Battalion. He was transferred to the 2nd Border Defense Unit of the Kwantung Army in 1938, and became commander of an infantry brigade in the IJA 27th Division. In 1941 he was commander of 64th Independent Infantry Group. In August 1939, Matuyama was promoted to lieutenant general.

From 1942 to 1945, Matsuyama succeeded General Masao Watanabe as commander of the IJA 56th Division, in operations in China, Burma and Thailand, and participated in the Battle of Northern Burma and Western Yunnan against the Chinese National Revolutionary Army forces along the Salween River. The 56th Division was annihilated in Longling Western Yunnan in 1944.
