= Dai Anlan =

Republic of China general (1904–1942)

- 戴安瀾
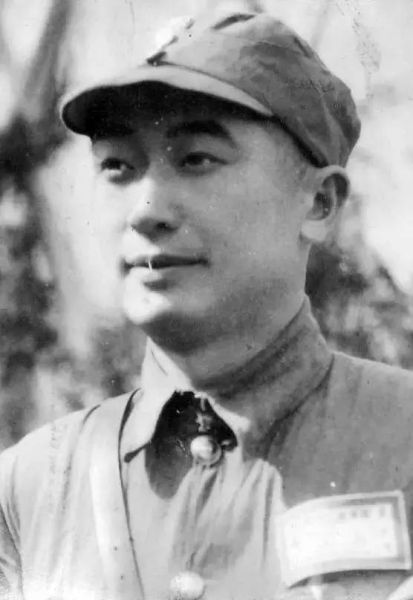
- Born: 25 November 1904; Wuwei County, Anhui, Qing dynasty China
- Died: May 26, 1942 (aged 37); Mogaung, Burma
- Military career
- Allegiance: Republic of China
- Branch: (Republic of China (1912–1949)) National Revolutionary Army
- Service years: 1924–1942
- Rank: Major general Lieutenant general (posthumous)
- Commands: 200th Division
- Conflicts: Battle of Kunlun Pass, Battle of Toungoo
- Awards: Legion of Merit

Dai Anlan (Chinese: 戴安瀾; Wade–Giles: Tai An-lan; 25 November 1904 – 26 May 1942) was a major general of the Republic of China. As commander of the 200th Division of the National Revolutionary Army, he distinguished himself in the Battle of Kunlun Pass and the Battle of Toungoo during the Second Sino-Japanese War and the Burma Campaign. He was wounded in battle while returning to China from Burma, and died in May 1942. He was posthumously promoted to lieutenant general by Chiang Kai-shek and awarded the Legion of Merit medal by US President Franklin D. Roosevelt.

== Early life and career ==
Dai was born in 1904 into a family of farmers in Wuwei County, Anhui, Qing China. His birth name was Dai Yangong (戴衍功), and was later given the name Dai Bingyang (戴炳陽) in school. An excellent student, he was accepted by the Anhui Public School run by Tao Xingzhi.

In 1924, Dai went to Guangzhou (Canton) after learning about the establishment of the Whampoa Military Academy. He was accepted by the academy later that year, and changed his name to "Anlan", which means "calming the waves". After graduating from Whampoa in early 1926, Dai was appointed a platoon commander in the National Revolutionary Army. He participated in the Northern Expedition and fought against the Japanese army during the Jinan incident.

== Second Sino-Japanese War and Burma Campaign ==
Following the Mukden Incident in 1931, the Empire of Japan occupied Northeast China and persistently encroached upon North China. In March 1933, Dai, by then a regiment commander, fought the Japanese army at the Gubeikou Great Wall, where his poorly trained peasant force suffered significant losses against the well equipped Japanese.

When the Second Sino-Japanese War fully broke out in 1937, Dai had been promoted to a brigade commander. He fought in many battles including at Taierzhuang and Wuhan, and was promoted to deputy commander of the 89th Division and then commander of the 200th Division. In December 1939, Dai commanded the 200th Division on the front line of the Battle of Kunlun Pass and successfully defended the pass against Japanese attack. Severely wounded in the battle, he returned to the unit after undergoing more than a month of medical treatment.

=== Battle of Toungoo ===
After the outbreak of the Pacific War in December 1941, the Japanese quickly captured the British colonies of Hong Kong and Singapore, and launched a major attack against British Burma. The British requested assistance from China, and the Kuomintang government sent 100,000 troops to fight in the Burma Campaign. Dai's 200th Division served as the vanguard of the Chinese Expeditionary Force and reached Toungoo in lower Burma on 8 March 1942. They engaged the Japanese for the first time on 19 March.

After destroying the British Air Force in Burma, the Japanese surrounded Toungoo with a force four times as numerous as Dai's defenders. However, the 200th Division fended off Japanese attacks for ten days, killing more than 5,000 enemy troops. After losing less than 2,000 of his own soldiers, Dai decided to give up Toungoo and the division broke out of the siege on 30 March.

=== Retreat and death ===
The 200th division retreated north across the Sittaung River and linked up with the 22nd Division. They blocked Japanese advance up the Sittaung and captured Taunggyi in central Burma from the Japanese on 25 April. However, as the Chinese and British forces both suffered heavy losses, the Kuomintang government ordered the Expeditionary Force to withdraw from Burma. While on their way home, the 200th Division was ambushed by the Japanese. They broke out of the siege, but Dai was wounded on 18 May in the battle, while two of his regiment commanders were killed. Eight days later, Dai Anlan died at Mogaung in northern Burma.

== Memorials and honours ==
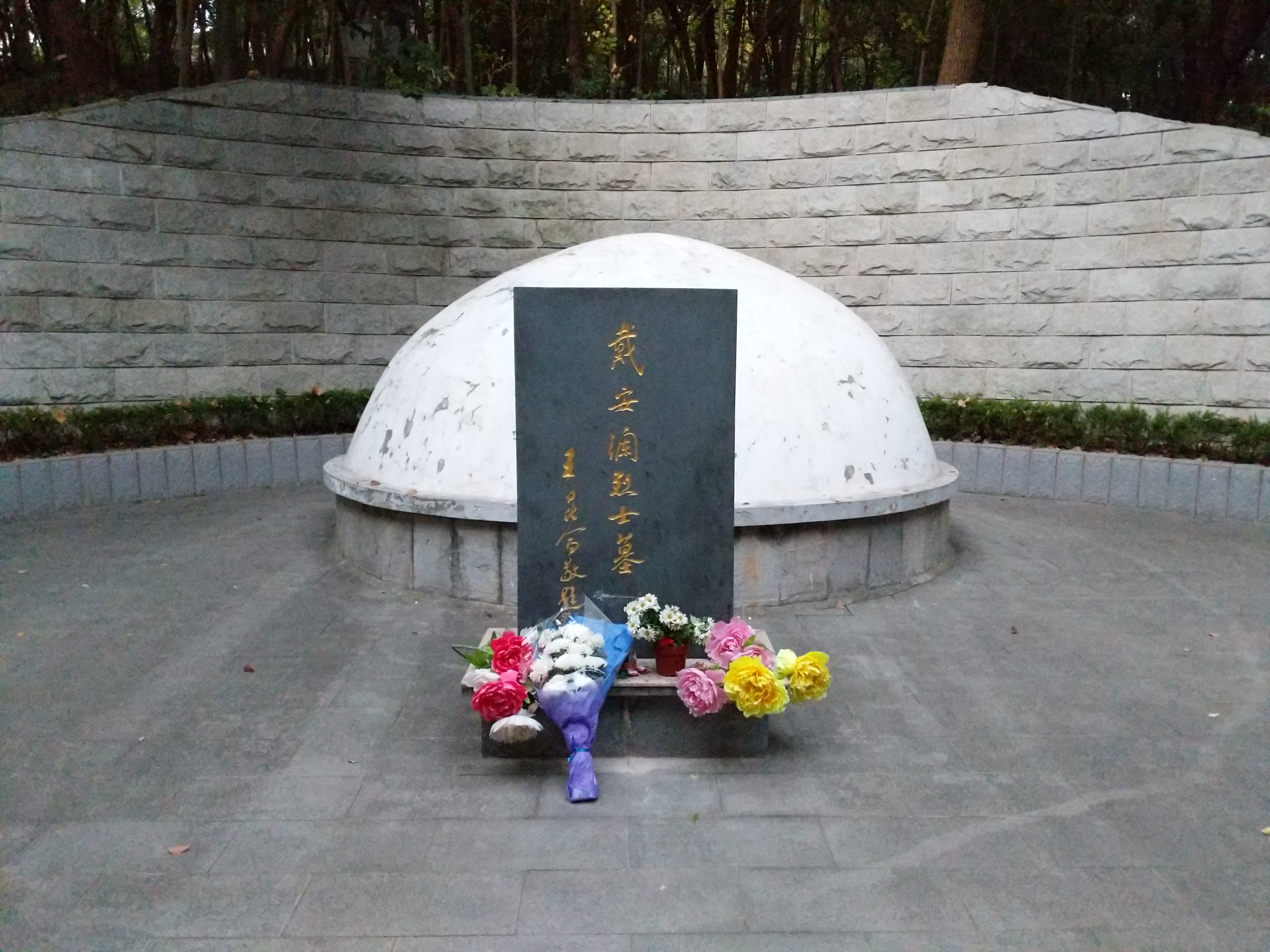
Tomb of Dai Anlan on Mount Zhe in Wuhu

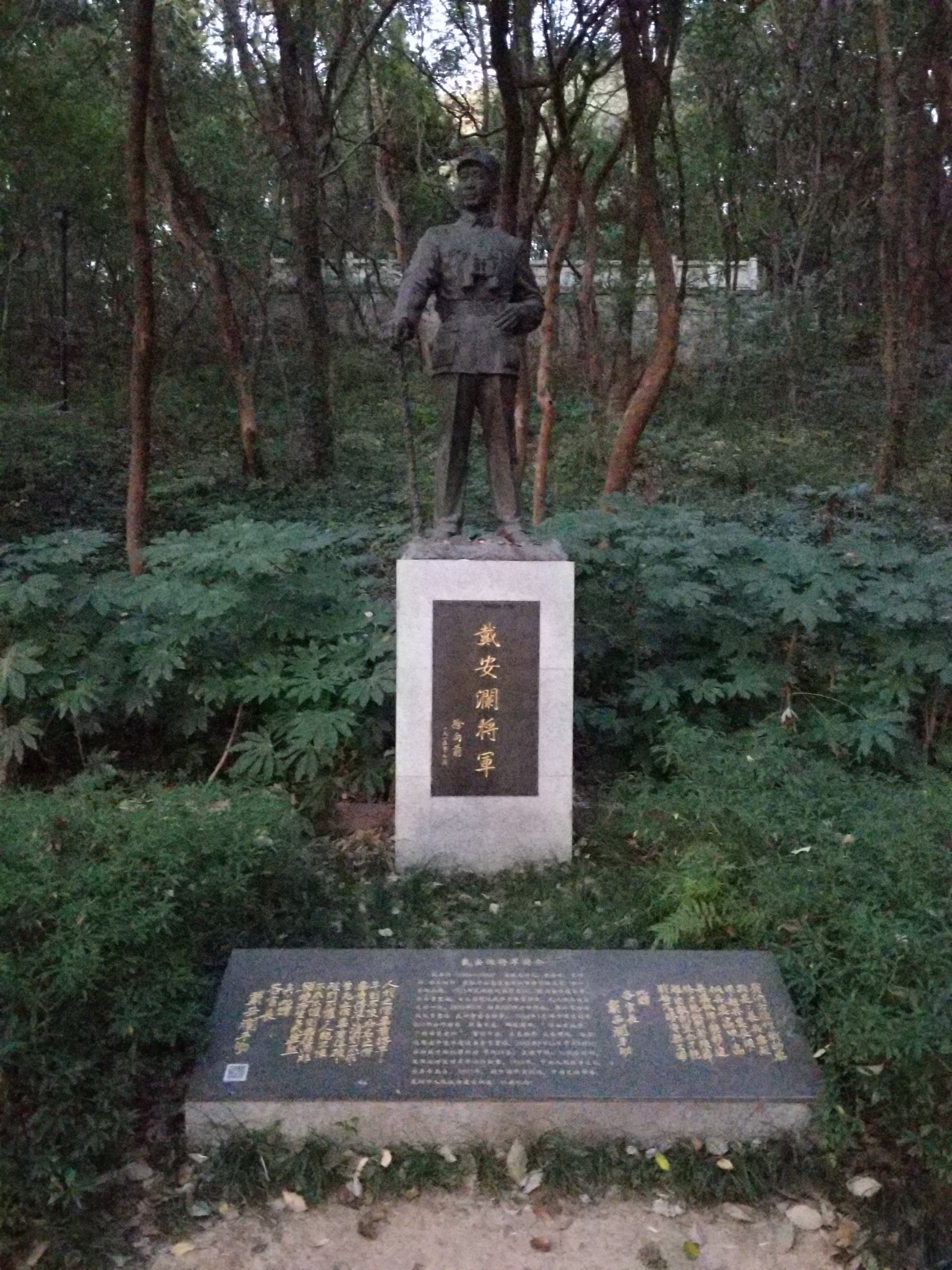
Statue of Dai Anlan

When the 200th Division returned to China, Dai's coffin was greeted by tens of thousands of mourners. In July 1942, he was given a state burial in Quanzhou, Guangxi, the home base of his division. Chiang Kai-shek composed an elegy in his memory and posthumously promoted his rank from major general to lieutenant general. As Dai's memorial service was held in Quanzhou, the Communist leader Mao Zedong, then based in Yan'an, composed the following poem:

As foreign aggression warrants repulsion,
The general composes Plucking Vetches.

His division boasts mechanized units,
His courage exceeds that of tigers and bears.

Bathing in blood in defense of Toungoo,
Returning victorious driving Japs from Taunggyi.

Eventually sacrificing himself on battlefield,
He had not deviated from his great aspiration.

— Mao Zedong, "Elegy for General Dai Anlan"

In 1944, when the Japanese launched the Operation Ichi-Go and attacked Guangxi, Dai's coffin was temporarily moved to Guiyang for protection. After the end of World War II, a permanent tomb was built for him on the scenic Mount Zhe in Wuhu, overlooking his hometown. When his coffin was reburied in 1947, the funeral procession was 1.5 kilometres (0.9 mi) long.

On 28 October 1942, US President Franklin D. Roosevelt awarded Dai the Legion of Merit medal, making him the first Chinese soldier to receive a military medal from the United States. In 1945, US President Harry S. Truman and Secretary of War Henry L. Stimson signed a certificate for the award. The medal and certificate were destroyed during the Cultural Revolution. In the 1980s, when Dai's eldest son Dai Fudong was a visiting scholar in the US, he wrote President Ronald Reagan to request a reissue of the items. His request was granted, and Fudong later donated the medal and certificate to the Military Museum of the Chinese People's Revolution.

In 1975, the Chunghwa Post of Taiwan issued a set of six stamps to commemorate the 30th anniversary of victory over Japan, featuring six national heroes who died in the war: Zhang Zizhong, Gao Zhihang, Sa Shijun, Xie Jinyuan, Yan Haiwen, and Dai Anlan.

In 2013, Dai's children, together with other descendants of the soldiers of the 200th Division, built a Buddhist pagoda in Mogaung to commemorate Dai Anlan and other soldiers who died in the Burma Campaign.

Plucking Vetches is a poem in the Chinese classic poem collection Shi that speaks of a soldier departing his family to engage in warfare against barbarians.

== Family ==
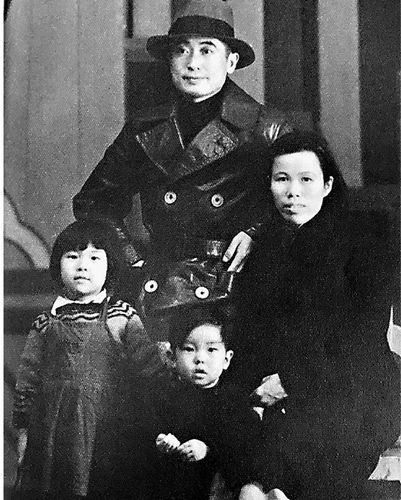
Dai Anlan with wife Wang Hexin and two of their children: Fanli and Jingdong

After Dai's death, his wife Wang Hexin (王荷馨) donated the entire death benefit of Fabi $200,000 she received from the Kuomintang government to build the Anlan Memorial School in Quanzhou, Guangxi. When the Kuomintang lost the Chinese Civil War in 1949, Wang and her children were offered the chance to retreat to Taiwan with the government. However, she chose to stay in mainland China to be near her husband's tomb.

Dai and his wife had three sons and a daughter: Dai Fudong, Dai Fanli (戴藩籬), Dai Jingdong (戴靖東), and Dai Chengdong (戴澄東). Fudong became a distinguished architect who was elected an academician of the Chinese Academy of Engineering; Fanli, the only daughter, enlisted in the People's Volunteer Army during the Korean War; Jingdong was a professor of the Nanjing Institute of Technology, and Chengdong was a senior hydraulic engineer in Jiangsu province.
