= Battle of Pegu =

Military engagement during the Burma campaign (1942)

Coordinates: 17°05′45″N 96°13′00″E

- Part of the Japanese invasion of Burma of World War II
Date	6 March 1942 – 7 March 1942
Location	Pegu, Burma
Result	Japanese victory: British retreat continued

Belligerents
United Kingdom: (British Raj) India	(Empire of Japan) Japan

Commanders and leaders
(United Kingdom) John Anstice DSO	(Empire of Japan) Shōjirō Iida

Strength
1 armoured brigade	2 divisions

The Battle of Pegu was an engagement in the Burma campaign in the Second World War. Fought on 6 and 7 March 1942, it concerned the defence of Rangoon (now Yangon) in Burma (now Myanmar). Japanese forces closed in on the British Indian Army who were deployed near Pegu (now Bago).

With the 17th Infantry Division decimated and scattered, the forces available for the whole of Burma were the 1st Burma Division and the 7th Armoured Brigade, equipped with American-made Stuart or "Honey" light tanks. The British commanders had already decided not to contest Rangoon, but their new strategy relied on convincing the Japanese that Rangoon would be heavily defended.

British/Indian forces fighting at Pegu were the 7th Queen's Own Hussars, the Cameronians (Scottish Rifles), 2nd Battalion, 12th Frontier Force Regiment, and surviving elements of the 17th Infantry; the West Yorkshire Regiment, 1st Battalion, 4th Prince of Wales's Own Gurkha Rifles, 7th Duke of Edinburgh's Own Gurkha Rifles, and the 4th Battalion, 12th Frontier Force Regiment.

== The battle ==
About midday on March 8 215th Regiment (of XXXIII Division) entered Rangoon to find to its surprise that the city was unoccupied and deserted. General Sakurai immediately ordered it to pursue the British column which he now realised was the whole of the British forces from the Rangoon area. It was too late and the golden opportunity of destroying the British garrison was lost.

— Official History.

=== Payagyi ===
"B" Squadron of the 7th Hussars, Maj. G. C. Davies-Gilbert commanding, arrived in the village of Payagyi to find the Japanese already there. Visibility was poor, and radio communication difficult. After a brief infantry engagement, the Stuart light tanks (nicknamed "Honeys" in the British and Commonwealth militaries) opened fire, destroying two Type 95 Ha-Go Japanese tanks. A confused battle ensued, in which two more Type 95s were destroyed, another Type 95 was abandoned by its crew, and four Japanese anti-tank guns captured. Then the order came for the British to move to Hlegu.

=== Hlegu ===
Hlegu was also in Japanese hands as the British approached. The Japanese had erected a roadblock, and they defended it with molotov cocktails, knocking out one of the Honeys. In the end, they were forced to retreat in the face of heavy fire from the tanks. The 7th Hussars' regimental chaplain, the Revd Neville Metcalfe, was awarded an immediate Distinguished Service Order for his actions in helping the British wounded, and conducting burial services for the dead, despite being wounded by mortar fire.

== Aftermath ==
General Alexander realised that Rangoon was doomed, and his new plan involved a withdrawal to Prome, some 200 miles to the north. The objective, to convince the Japanese that Rangoon would be defended, had been achieved.

The British Indian Army moved on to Taukkyan that evening.

=== Battle honours ===
The British and Commonwealth system of battle honours recognised participation in the Battle of Pegu in 1956, 1957 and 1962 by the award to one unit the battle honour Pegu and the award to six units the battle honour Pegu 1942 for resisting the Japanese invasion of Burma from 6 March 1942 to 7 March 1942.

== Sources ==
- Liddell Hart, B.H., History of the Second World War. New York: G.P. Putnam, 1970. ISBN 0-306-80912-5.
- Rodger, Alexander (2003). Battle Honours of the British Empire and Commonwealth Land Forces. Marlborough: The Crowood Press. ISBN 1-86126-637-5.
- Slim, William (1956), Defeat Into Victory. Citations from the Four Square Books 1958 edition which lacks an ISBN, but also available from NY: Buccaneer Books ISBN 1-56849-077-1, Cooper Square Press ISBN 0-8154-1022-0; London: Cassell ISBN 0-304-29114-5, Pan ISBN 0-330-39066-X.
