= Battle of Kunlun Pass =

1939 battle of the Second Sino-Japanese War

- Part of the Battle of South Guangxi in the Second Sino-Japanese War
Date	December 18, 1939 – January 11, 1940 (3 weeks and 3 days)
Location	Suburbs of Nanning city in Guangxi province, Republic of China
Result	Chinese victory

Belligerents
Republic of China	Empire of Japan

Commanders and leaders
(Republic of China (1912–1949)) Bai Chongxi (Republic of China (1912–1949)) Du Yuming (Republic of China (1912–1949)) Qiu Qingquan (Republic of China (1912–1949)) Li Mi (Republic of China (1912–1949)) Liao Yaoxiang (Republic of China (1912–1949)) Dai Anlan	Masao Nakamura †

Strength
5th corps : 54,000+: 200th Division: 54 tanks out of 82 T-26 M1935/M1937 tanks and ~30 CV-35 tankettes; 66th and 99th corps : 32,400+ (Note: The number of troops from the 118th and 160th divisions are unknown and are not included) 3rd PG, 32nd PS, Capt. Wei Yiqing †: 14 I-15, 7 Gladiators, ? O-2; 5th PG, 28th PS, Capt. Arthur Chin: ? I-15, 3 Gladiators	5th division (particularly the 21st Brigade) plus various other units, total fighting strength of 45,000; 100 planes 70 warships 2 aircraft carriers Chinese Claim : 15,000+

Casualties and losses
5th corps : 123 officers and 5,560 soldiers killed 265 officers and 10,847 soldiers wounded 896 soldiers missing 4 T-26s; 4 CV-35s; 11 T-26s recovered and repaired 5 CV-35s recovered and repaired 66th and 99th corps : 5,079 officers and soldiers killed 6,200+ officers and soldiers wounded 560+ officers and soldiers missing	Official Chinese Army claim : 4,200 killed or wounded 7 captured 6,000+ casualties including brigade commander Masao Nakamura killed Other Chinese claim : 10,000 casualties, including 5,000 killed and 102 captured Japanese claim : 21st infantry regiment and attached units : 376 killed, 755 wounded, and 37 missing 9th Infantry Brigade of the Oikawa task force (January 1 to January 27, 1940) : 48 killed, 175 wounded.

The Battle of Kunlun Pass (simplified Chinese: 昆仑关战役; traditional Chinese: 崑崙關戰役; pinyin: Kūnlúnguān Zhànyì) was a series of conflicts between the Imperial Japanese Army and the Chinese forces surrounding Kunlun Pass, a key strategic position in Guangxi province. The Japanese forces planned to cut off Chinese supply lines linking to French Indochina, but the Chinese forces managed to fight off the attacks.

== The battle ==
The Imperial Japanese Army launched a major offensive into Guangxi province with the intention of eliminating the Chinese supply route through French-controlled Vietnam. The elite Japanese 5th Division was given the task of spearheading the Japanese offensive. After occupying Nanning in November 1939, the Japanese captured the key point of Kunlun Pass and were poised to attack the Chinese forces that protected Chongqing, the wartime capital.

Realizing that inaction would result in being cut off, General Bai Chongxi, himself a native of Guangxi, asked the Nationalist Government for reinforcements. Chiang Kai-shek in turn, dispatched the 5th Corps from Hunan province to fight the Japanese.

The 5th Corps was the most elite unit in the National Revolutionary Army, and it was also the only Chinese unit that had tanks and armored vehicles. Its soldiers were combat-hardened veterans from previous engagements against Japanese forces, and as a result, morale was high. General Du Yuming, commander of the 5th Corps, dispatched two divisions to attack the Japanese-held Kunlun Pass. The New 22nd Division's attack ended up cutting off Japanese reinforcements from the rear and also resulted in the death of the Japanese commander, Major General Masao Nakamura.

The Japanese reacted immediately by sending in the elite unit of the Japanese 5th Division, the 21st Brigade, which had also participated in the Russo-Japanese War, nicknamed the "unbreakable sword". Faced with the serious possibility of being completely cut off, the Japanese army ended up relying on air power for the delivery of vital supplies. Before Major General Nakamura's death, he admitted in his diary that the Chinese soldiers' fighting ability had surpassed the Russians whom the Brigade encountered in Manchuria. At a heavy cost, the Chinese army claimed to have inflicted a total of 10,000 casualties on the Japanese. Among the claimed Japanese casualties were 5,000 fatalities, including over 85% of all officers, such as Major General Nakamura, Colonel Sakata Gen'ichi (commander of the 42nd Regiment and acting commander of the 21st Brigade), Colonel Miki Kichinosuke (commander of the 21st Regiment), Colonel 生田滕一 (deputy commander of the 21st Regiment), 杵平作 (commander of the 1st Battalion), 官本得 (commander of the 2nd Battalion), 森本宮 (commander of the 3rd Battalion), among others. Additionally, the Chinese claimed to have taken 102 Japanese troops as prisoners, and captured 79 horses, 10 mountain guns, 12 field guns, 10 anti-tank guns, 102 light machine guns, 80 heavy machine guns, and 2,000 rifles.

The Japanese army reported Colonel Miki's 21st infantry regiment (including Matsumoto's battalion of the 42nd infantry regiment temporarily under Colonel Miki's command) as 376 killed, 755 wounded, and 37 missing. The losses of the 9th infantry brigade of the Oikawa task force from January 1 to January 27, 1940 were 48 killed and 175 wounded. The losses of the 42nd infantry regiment (excluding Matsumoto's battalion) and units directly under the 5th division until December 31 were unknown.

Kaji Wataru, a Japanese member of the Chinese Resistance, and his Anti-War League, which was made up of Japanese POWs who had defected to the Chinese resistance, were sent to Kunlun during the battle to launch a psychological warfare campaign against Japanese troops in the region. Their operations were reported by an Australian Newspaper during the war.

== Orders of battle ==
=== Chinese ===
- 5th Corps - Commander Du Yuming
  - 200th Division - Commander Dai Anlan
  - 1st Honor Division - Commander Zheng Dongguo
  - New 22nd Division - Commander Qiu Qingquan

=== Japanese ===
- 21st Brigade / 5th Division
  - 21st Infantry Regiment
  - 42nd Infantry Regiment
- Cavalry Regiment / 5th Division
- 5th Artillery Regiment / 5th Division
- Two Regiments / Taiwan Mixed Brigade
