= 200th Division (National Revolutionary Army) =

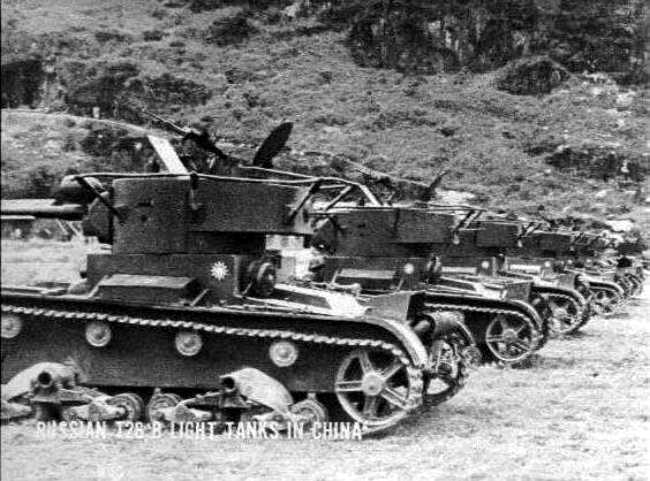
- The 200th Division's Soviet built T-26 tanks on exercise in Hunan
- Active: 1938–1949
- Country: China
- Branch: National Revolutionary Army
- Type: Mechanized
- Role: Infantry
- Size: 9,000 as of 1938
- Garrison/HQ: Wuhan
- Nickname: Iron division
- Patron: Chiang Kai-shek
- March: March of the Volunteers
- Engagements: Second Sino-Japanese War; Battle of Lanfeng; Battle of Kunlun Pass; Battle of Yunnan-Burma Road; Chinese Civil War; Menglianggu Campaign; Huaihai Campaign; Battle of Guningtou
- Decorations: Presidential Unit Citation, Tiger Flag

Commanders
- Ceremonial chief: Chiang Kai-shek
- Notable commanders: Du Yuming, Qiu Qingquan, Dai Anlan, Sun Liren, Liao Yaoxiang, Li Mi

Insignia
- Identification symbol
- Identification symbol: Divisional insignia

The 200th Division (simplified Chinese: 第200师; traditional Chinese: 第200師; pinyin: Dì 200 Shī; Wade–Giles: Ti ²⁰⁰ Shih) was the first mechanised division in the National Revolutionary Army. It was created in 1938 by General Du Yuming, who was also its first commander. Its first action was against the Japanese 14th Division in the Battle of Lanfeng.

== Background ==
The predecessor of the 200th division was the Armoured Corps of the National Revolutionary Army. In 1935, the Wehrmacht established its first three panzer divisions. Seeing the development of the German armoured forces, the German advisors in China applied their experiences to develop China's own armoured corps. China-Germany relations was at its peak and China had purchased enough German weapons and vehicles to form regimental-level mechanized units. On 16 May 1937, the National Revolutionary Army's Armoured Corps was established with Du Yuming as the commander. Due to resource constrictions, the Chinese army could not follow the model of their German counterpart. The Armoured Corps was thus composed of :

- A tank battalion composed of three tank companies, one supply company, one communications platoon, one special forces platoon, and one search platoon.
- An anti-tank battalion composed of four anti-tank companies, one communications platoon, and one special forces platoon.
- An anti-tank training unit composed of three training battalions.
- A search battalion composed of one armoured vehicle company, two motorized infantry companies, one communications platoon, and one supply platoon.
- An anti-air battalion composed of three anti-air companies, one supply platoon, one special forces platoon, and one factory.
- A reserve battalion composed of three infantry companies.
- A supplementary battalion composed of three supplementary companies.
- A special forces platoon.
- A communications company.
- A repair factory.

The 3rd tank company was equipped with Panzer 1 tanks. The 1st and 2nd tank companies were equipped with the lighter Vickers 6-ton tanks.

On 7 July 1937, the Second Sino-Japanese War began, followed by the battle of Shanghai in August. The 1st and 2nd tank companies of the tank battalion and the anti-tank battalion were subsequently ordered to reinforce the infantry in Shanghai. On August 21, the tank companies led an assault with the 108th brigade of the 36th division, approaching the Huishan Wharf (匯山碼頭). However, due to improper combined arms tactics, the tanks advanced too fast and the infantry could not keep up, resulting in the tanks being isolated and suffering heavy losses. Both company commanders Guo Hengjian (郭恆健) and Zheng Shaoyan (鄭紹炎) were killed and three-fifths of the tank companies were killed or wounded. Three tanks were destroyed and eight were damaged.

After the battle of Shanghai, the Japanese army advanced towards Nanking. The 3rd tank company and a portion of the 2nd battalion of the anti-tank training unit subsequently took part in the battle of Nanking. On December 6, a unit of four tanks attacked a large Japanese unit. During the battle, two of the tanks were destroyed and one was abandoned due to mechanical failure. All the remaining Panzer I tanks were lost during the break-out attempts and the 3rd tank company was completely wiped out. The remnants of the Armoured Corps were reorganized into the 200th division.

== Original organization (January 1938) ==
200th Division

- 1149th Regiment (Tank Regiment)
- 1150th Regiment (Tank Regiment)
- 1151st Regiment (Armoured Car Regiment)
- 1152nd Regiment (Mechanized Infantry)
- 52nd Artillery Regiment

=== Equipment ===
The Tank regiments had 70 T-26, 4 BT-5, 20 ( 92? ) CV-33 tanks, AMR 35 tanks. The armoured car regiment had around 50 BA armoured cars and 12 ( 18? ) Leichter Panzerspähwagen (Sd Kfz 221) armoured cars. Besides, it had more than 400 Ford trucks. The motorised infantry regiment used Soviet trucks and rifles, and the artillery regiment had 12 122 mm howitzers, also 45 mm anti-aircraft artillery and 75 mm field guns.

In May 1938, the division participated in the Battle of Lanfeng, losing 13 vehicles and suffering 29 killed or wounded. In October, the 1149th regiment of the division participated in the battle of Wuhan. Afterwards, the division's original subordinate mechanized units were placed under direct command of the 5th Army, and the division was reorganized as a motorized infantry division of about 9,000 men due to the June 1938 reorganization of Divisions.

== Organization (October 1938) ==
200th Division (Major-General Dai Anlan)

- 598th Regiment
- 599th Regiment
- 600th Regiment

It was next sent as reinforcement to the First Battle of Changsha but was never engaged. The armoured and artillery Regiments were placed under direct command of 5th Army and the 200th Division became a motorized Infantry Division within the same Army with the 1st Honor Division. The 200th Division participated with 5th Corps against the Japanese invasion of Guangxi, in the defense of Nanning, and in the devastating victory against the Japanese in the Battle of Kunlun Pass, wiping out an entire Japanese brigade. It suffered heavy losses after the battle at Kunlun Pass in an offensive against Batang, losing nearly two-thirds of its strength.

Rebuilt and reorganized, the division participated in the Battle of Yunnan-Burma Road in early 1942 and in the Burma campaign. The 200th Division distinguished itself in fighting in the Battle of Toungoo and the Battle of Hopong - Taunggyi but suffered a disastrous defeat in the Battle of Hsipaw-Mogok Highway near the end of the campaign as it was attempting to retreat to China. Its commanding officer, Dai Anlan, died of wounds suffered in that battle while being carried by the remnants of his force as it made its way back to China. The division entered Burma with 9,000 troops, lost 1,800 troops in combat, lost 3,200 troops during the retreat, and arrived in China with only 4,000 troops left.

In 1944, the division participated in the Battle of Northern Burma and Western Yunnan as part of the Second Chinese Expeditionary Force, assisting in the recapture of Longling, Mangshi, Zhefang and Wanding at the cost of 5,000 casualties.

== Sources ==
- Elite Troops of the National Revolutionary Army, the 200th Division
