= Japanese invasion of Burma =

Part of World War II

- Part of the Burma campaign of World War II
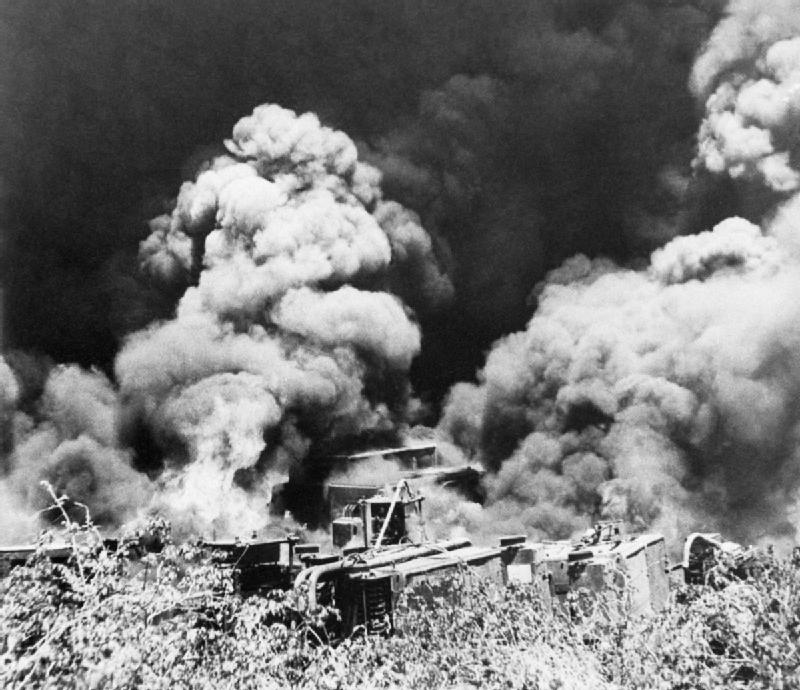
- View of the Yenangyaung oil field on 16 April 1942 after its destruction ahead of the Japanese advance
Date	14 December 1941 – 28 May 1942 (5 months, 1 week and 3 days)
Location	Burma
Result	Japanese victory
Territorial changes	Japanese establish State of Burma as a puppet state over most of British Burma; Thai annexation of Shan State

Belligerents
United Kingdom; India; British Burma; China; United States (air support)	Japan; Burma Independence Army; Thailand (from 10 May)

Commanders and leaders
Archibald Wavell; Thomas Hutton; Harold Alexander; John Smyth; Luo Zhuoying	Hisaichi Terauchi; Shōjirō Iida; Suzuki Keiji; Charun Rattanakun Seriroengrit

Strength
(Republic of China (1912–1949)); Western Claim : 95,000; Chinese Claim : 103,000 (British Empire) ~45,000	(Empire of Japan) 85,000 (Myanmar) ~23,000 (Thailand) 35,000

Casualties and losses
(Republic of China (1912–1949)) Western Claim : 40,000 casualties Chinese Claim : 56,480 or 61,000 losses (most dead during the retreat). (British Empire); 1,499 killed; 2,595 wounded; 9,369 missing & POWs; 13,463 total 30,000 casualties 116 aircraft destroyed, damaged and captured (RAF) ~100 tanks destroyed, damaged or captured (United States) 73 aircraft destroyed, damaged and captured (AVG); Japanese Claim : 27,454 killed; 4,918 POWs	(Empire of Japan) 2,431 deaths from all causes (Note: Including 1,896 killed in action, 103 died of wounds, and 432 non-combat deaths) Unknown tanks destroyed or damaged 117 aircraft destroyed and damaged
- More than 10,000–50,000 civilians killed

The Japanese invasion of Burma, referred to by the BIA in 1941 as the fourth Anglo-Burmese war or the war of Burmese Independence, was a series of battles fought in the British colony of Burma (present-day Myanmar) as part of the Pacific theatre of World War II. The initial invasion in 1942 resulted in the capture of Rangoon and the retreat of British, Indian, and Chinese forces. The invasion had the support of the Burma Independence Army (BIA), which fought in view of decolonisation. However, Japan installed a puppet state in Burma, which lost the support of the Burmese people.

After the invasion, from 1942 to 1945, the Allies and Japan engaged in a protracted struggle for control of the region, marked by fierce fighting in challenging terrain. The Burma campaign was strategically significant, as it was linked to the war in China and the supply routes to the Chinese Nationalists. The eventual Allied victory in 1945 played a crucial role in the overall defeat of Japan.

== Background ==
=== British rule in Burma ===
Before the Second World War broke out, Burma was part of the British Empire, having been progressively occupied and annexed following three Anglo-Burmese wars in the 19th century. Initially governed as part of British India, Burma was formed into a separate colony under the Government of India Act 1935. Under British rule, there had been substantial economic development but the majority Bamar community was becoming increasingly restive. Among their concerns were the importation of Indian workers to provide a labour force for many of the new industries, and the erosion of traditional society in the countryside as land was used for plantations of export crops or became mortgaged to Indian moneylenders. Pressure for independence was growing. When Burma came under attack, the Bamar were unwilling to contribute to the defence of the British establishment, and many readily joined movements which aided the Japanese.

=== British defences ===
British plans for the defence of British Far Eastern possessions involved the construction of airfields linking Singapore and Malaya with India. These plans had not taken into account the fact that Britain was also at war with Germany, and when Japan entered the war, the forces needed to defend these possessions were not available. Burma had been regarded as a military "backwater", unlikely to be subjected to Japanese threat.

Lieutenant General Thomas Hutton, the commander of Burma Army with its headquarters in Rangoon, had only the 17th Indian Infantry Division and 1st Burma Division to defend the country, although help was expected from the Chinese Nationalist government under Chiang Kai-shek. During the war, the British Indian Army expanded more than twelve-fold from its peacetime strength of 200,000 but in late 1941 this expansion meant that most units were undertrained and ill-equipped. In most cases, such training and equipment as the Indian units in Burma received was for operations in the Western Desert campaign or the North West Frontier of India, rather than jungles. The battalions of the Burma Rifles which formed most of the 1st Burma Division were originally raised as internal security troops only, from among minority communities in Burma such as the Karens. They also had been rapidly expanded, with an influx of Bamar soldiers, and were short of equipment and consisted mainly of new recruits.

=== Japanese plans ===
Japan entered the war primarily to obtain raw materials, especially oil, from European (particularly Dutch) possessions in South East Asia which were weakly defended because of the war in Europe. Their plans involved an attack on Burma partly because of Burma's own natural resources (which included some oil from fields around Yenangyaung, but also minerals such as cobalt and large surpluses of rice), but also to protect the flank of their main attack against Malaya and Singapore and provide a buffer zone to protect the territories they intended to occupy.

An additional factor was the Burma Road completed in 1938, which linked Lashio, at the end of a railway from the port of Rangoon, with the Chinese province of Yunnan. This newly completed link was being used to move aid and munitions to the Chinese Nationalist forces of Chiang Kai-Shek which had been fighting the Japanese for several years. The Japanese naturally wished to cut this link.

The Southern Expeditionary Army Group under overall command of General Hisaichi Terauchi was responsible for all military operations in the South-East Asia. The Japanese Fifteenth Army, commanded by Lieutenant General Shojiro Iida, was initially assigned the mission of occupying northern Thailand, which had signed a treaty of friendship with Japan on 21 December 1941, and attacking the southern Burmese province of Tenasserim across the Tenasserim Hills. The army consisted of the highly regarded 33rd Division and the 55th Division, although both divisions were weakened for several weeks by detachments to other operations.

=== Burmese insurgents ===
As the threat of war grew, the Japanese sought links with potential allies in Burma. In late 1940 Aung San, a Burmese student activist, made contact with Suzuki Keiji in Amoy and voyaged to Japan for talks. He and several other volunteers (the Thirty Comrades) were later given intensive military training on Hainan Island. The Burma Independence Army (BIA) was officially founded in Bangkok, Thailand on 28 December 1941. It consisted initially of 227 Burmese and 74 Japanese personnel. When the army entered Burma it numbered 2,300 men. As the Japanese and the BIA entered Burma, the BIA gained support from the civilian population and were bolstered by many Bamar volunteers. By the time the Japanese forces reached Rangoon on 8 March, the BIA numbered 10,000–12,000, and eventually expanded to between 18,000 and 23,000.

== Japanese capture of Rangoon ==
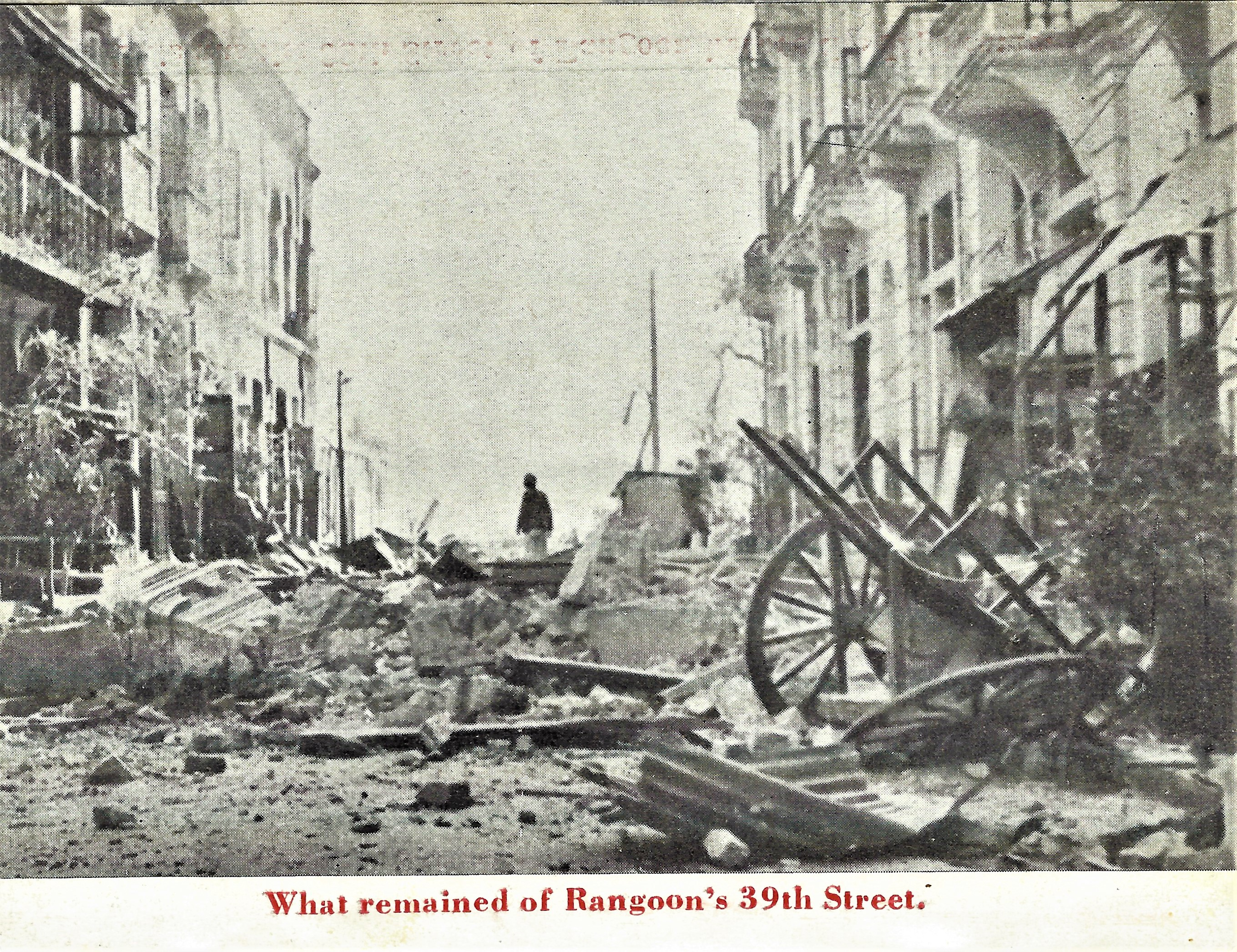
View of bomb damage in Rangoon after the Japanese aerial attack in December 1941

On 22 December 1941, the Japanese 55th Division based in Bangkok, led by Lieutenant-General Takeshi Koga, was ordered to cross the Burma frontier, and capture Moulmein. By 17 January, the division was in Mae Sot, preparing to advance on Kawkareik, and then onwards to Moulmein. On 22 January 1942, the British evacuated Mergui. According to Louis Allen, "By 23 January 1942, the three important airstrips in southern Tenasserim – Tavoy, Mergui, Victoria Point – were all in Japanese hands, and fighter cover could now be provided for every bombing raid on Rangoon."

Rangoon was initially defended relatively successfully against Japanese air raids, by small RAF detachments reinforced by a squadron of the American Volunteer Group, better known as the "Flying Tigers". The majority of the airfields were between Rangoon and the Axis advance and as the Japanese gained use of the airfields in Tenasserim, the amount of warning the Rangoon airfields could get of attack decreased, and they became more and more untenable.

On 22 January 1942, the main body of the Japanese 55th Division began the main attack westward from Rahaeng in Thailand across the Kawkareik Pass. The 16th Indian Infantry Brigade of the 17th Indian Division guarding this approach retreated hastily westward. The Japanese division advanced to Moulmein at the mouth of the Salween River which was garrisoned by the 2nd Burma Infantry Brigade. The position was almost impossible to defend, and had the River Salween, almost 1.5 miles (2.4 km) wide, behind it. The 2nd Burma Brigade was squeezed into a progressively tighter perimeter, and eventually retreated over the river by ferry on 31 January after abandoning a large amount of supplies and equipment. Part of the force was left behind in Moulmein and had to swim the river.

=== Battle of Pa-an ===
In the early hours of 12 February, 1942, a battle was fought between three companies of the 7th battalion of the 10th Baluch Regiment (17th Indian Division), and three battalions of the 215th Infantry Regiment of the 33rd Japanese Division, at the village of Kuzeik along the west bank of the Salween River. The small town of Pa-an lay on the east bank. The Japanese crossed the river from Pa-an under the cover of darkness, on the night of 11 February, and attacked at 45 minutes past midnight.

The Baluchs (actually consisting of companies of Dogras, Punjabi Mussalmans, and Pathans) were mostly fresh recruits, trained in desert warfare, and lacking arms and ammunition. Nonetheless, they put up a stiff resistance, holding their position for several hours and engaging in much hand-to-hand combat. However, the Japanese were able to ultimately overrun the British positions by the morning of February 12, as they outnumbered the Baluchis five to one, had more prior battle experience, and benefited from attacks on the British positions at Kuzeik by Japanese dive bombers in the preceding days and hours. Less than a third of the Baluchs survived the battle.

The remnants of the British units from this battle retreated northward to the Brigade command at Thaton. This battle is mostly referred to as the 'Battle of Pa-an', and sometimes as the 'Battle of Kuzeik-Pa-an'.

=== Sittang Bridge ===
The 17th Indian Division soon fell back further northward. They attempted to hold the Bilin River (14-19 February) and other fallback lines as they did so, but had too few troops to avoid being continually outflanked. The division eventually retreated toward the bridge over the Sittang River in general disorder. The retreat was delayed by incidents such as a vehicle breaking through the bridge deck, air attacks (including, allegedly, accidental attacks by the RAF and AVG), and Japanese harassment. The delays allowed Japanese parties to infiltrate to the bridge itself, and the poorly organised defence of the bridge was in danger of collapsing. Fearing that the bridge would fall intact to the Japanese who would use it to advance on Rangoon, the divisional commander, Major-General "Jackie" Smyth, VC, ordered it to be blown up on the morning of 23 February 1942, with most of the division stranded on the enemy-held side.

Many of the men of the 17th Division who were trapped on the Japanese-held side of the river made their way across to the west bank by swimming or on improvised rafts, but had to abandon almost all their equipment, including most of their small arms. This later led some to question the decision to blow the bridge, arguing that the river itself did not offer much of an obstacle to the Japanese, and that more harm than good was achieved, as it resulted in the stranding of two brigades and delayed the Japanese capture of Rangoon by ten days at most.

=== Fall of Rangoon ===
Though the Sittang River was in theory a strong defensive position, the disaster at the bridge left the Allied forces too weak to hold it. General Archibald Wavell, the commander-in-chief of the ABDA Command, nevertheless ordered Rangoon to be held. He was expecting substantial reinforcements from the Middle East, including an Australian infantry division. On 28 February, he formally relieved Hutton (although Hutton had officially already been superseded in command by General Harold Alexander), and on the following day he sacked Smyth, who was in any case very ill.

Although the Australian government refused to allow its troops to be committed to Burma, some British and Indian reinforcements, including the British 7th Armoured Brigade (equipped with new M3 Stuart tanks) and the 63rd Indian Infantry Brigade, landed in Rangoon. Alexander ordered counter-attacks against the Japanese at Pegu, 40 miles (64 km) northeast of Rangoon, but soon realised that there was no hope of defending Rangoon. On 7 March, the Burma Army evacuated Rangoon after implementing a scorched earth plan to deny the Japanese the use of its facilities. The port was destroyed and the oil terminal was blown up. As the Allies departed, the city was on fire.

The remnants of the Burma Army faced encirclement as they retreated north from the city, but broke through the Taukkyan Roadblock as the result of an error on the part of the local Japanese commander. Colonel Takanobu Sakuma, commanding the Japanese 214th Infantry Regiment, had been ordered to block the main road north from Rangoon to Prome while the main body of the 33rd Division circled round the city to attack from the west. The retreating British and Indian troops were thrown back when they attempted to break through Sakuma's road block. Alexander ordered another attack but found the Japanese had gone. Not realising that the British were evacuating Rangoon, Sakuma had withdrawn the road block, as ordered, once the 33rd Division reached its intended positions. Had he not done so, the Japanese might have captured General Alexander and much of the rest of the Burma Army.

The Japanese Fifteenth Army claimed 930 abandoned enemy corpses and 156 POWs while suffering 178 killed and 201 wounded in the battle of Rangoon.

== Japanese advance to the Salween and Chindwin ==
Electrical equipment and oil installations at Yenanguang being destroyed as part of the "scorched earth" policy, in the face of the Japanese advance

After the fall of Rangoon, the Allies tried to make a stand in central Burma. It was hoped that the Chinese Expeditionary Force in Burma, commanded by Luo Zhuoying and consisting of the Fifth Army (commanded by Du Yuming) and the Sixth and Sixty-sixth Armies, could hold a front south of Mandalay. The Chinese armies each had approximately the strength of a British division but comparatively little equipment. Meanwhile, the newly created Burma Corps which had been formed to relieve Burma Army headquarters of the day-to-day responsibility for operations and consisted of 1st Burma Division, 17th Indian Division and 7th Armoured Brigade, defended the Irrawaddy River valley. Supplies were not immediately a problem, as much war material (including material originally meant for shipment to China) had been evacuated from Rangoon, rice was plentiful and the oilfields in central Burma were still intact, but no proper land routes from India existed and only the recapture of Rangoon would allow the Allies to hold Burma indefinitely.

The Allies hoped that the Japanese advance would slow down; instead, it gained speed. The Japanese reinforced their two divisions in Burma with the 18th Division transferred from Malaya and the 56th Division transferred from the Dutch East Indies after the fall of Singapore and Java. They also brought in large numbers of captured British trucks and other vehicles, which allowed them to move supplies rapidly using southern Burma's road network, and also use Motorised infantry columns, particularly against the Chinese forces. The Royal Air Force wing operating from Magwe was crippled by the withdrawal of the radar and radio-intercept units to India and the Japanese soon gained supremacy in the air. Unopposed Japanese bomber fleets attacked almost every major town and city in the Allied-held part of Burma, causing widespread destruction and disorder. The rapidly expanding Burma Independence Army harassed the Allied forces, while many Bamar soldiers of the Burma Rifles were deserting.

The Allies were also hampered by the progressive breakdown of the civil government in the areas they held, and the large numbers of refugees. The flow of refugees began soon after the bombing of Rangoon in late December 1941 and increased to a "mass exodus" in February 1942 as the Indian (and Anglo-Indian and Anglo-Burmese) population of Burma fled to India, fearing both the Japanese and hostile Burmese. Middle-class Indians and mixed-race refugees could often afford to buy tickets on ships or even planes, while ordinary labourers and their families in many cases were forced to make their way on foot.

The commander of Burma Corps, Lieutenant General William Slim, tried to mount a counter-offensive on the western part of the front, but his troops were repeatedly outflanked and forced to fight their way out of encirclement. The corps was gradually pushed northward towards Mandalay. The 1st Burma Division was cut off and trapped in the blazing oilfields at Yenangyaung, which the Allies themselves demolished to deny the facilities to the Japanese. Although the division was rescued by Chinese infantry and British tanks in the Battle of Yenangyaung, it lost almost all its equipment and its cohesion.

On the eastern part of the front, in the Battle of Yunnan-Burma Road, the Chinese 200th Division held up the Japanese for a time around Toungoo, but after its fall the road was open for motorised troops of the Japanese 56th Division to shatter the Chinese Sixth Army to the east in the Karenni States and advance northward through the Shan States to capture Lashio, outflanking the Allied defensive lines and cutting off the Chinese armies from Yunnan. With the effective collapse of the entire defensive line, there was little choice left other than an overland retreat to India or to Yunnan.

=== Allied retreat ===
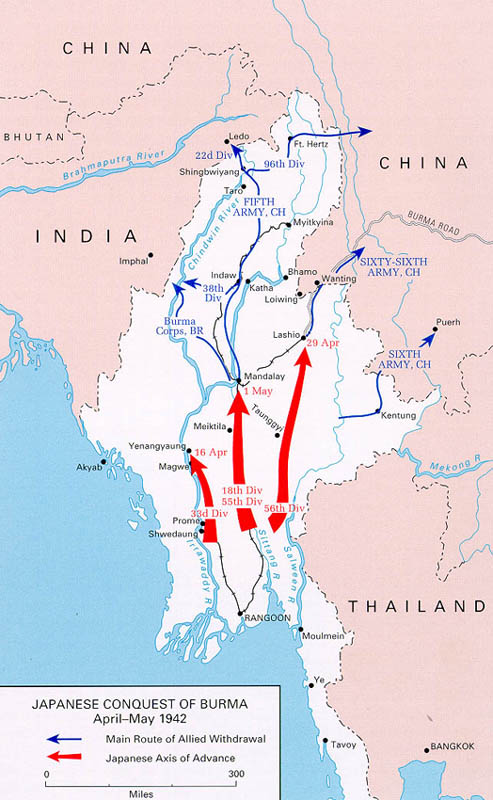
Japanese advance and Allied retreat

The retreat was conducted in horrible circumstances. Starving refugees, disorganised stragglers, and the sick and wounded clogged the primitive roads and tracks leading to India.

At least 500,000 civilian fugitives reached India, while an unknown number, conservatively estimated between 10,000 and 50,000, died along the way. In later months, 70 to 80% of those who reached India were afflicted with diseases such as dysentery, smallpox, malaria or cholera, with 30% "desperately so".

On 26 April the British, Indian and Burmese forces joined the civilians in a full retreat. The Burma Corps retreated to Manipur in India. At one stage, Alexander proposed that the 7th Armoured Brigade and one infantry brigade accompany the Chinese armies into Yunnan, but he was persuaded that the armoured brigade would quickly become ineffective once it was cut off from India.

The Japanese tried to cut off Burma Corps by sending troops by boat up the Chindwin River to seize the riverside port of Monywa on the night of 1/2 May. The hastily reconstituted 1st Burma Division was unable to recapture Monywa, but allowed the rest of the Corps to withdraw to the north. As the Corps tried to cross to Kalewa on the west bank of the Chindwin by ramshackle ferries on 10 May, the Japanese advancing from Monywa attempted to surround them in a "basin" encircled by cliffs at Shwegyin on the east bank. Although counter-attacks allowed the troops to escape, most of the Burma Corps' remaining equipment had to be destroyed or abandoned. On 12 May, the Japanese occupied Kalewa, having covered 1,500 miles (2,400 km) in 127 days, fighting 34 battles.

Burma Corps reached Imphal in Manipur just before the monsoon broke in May 1942. The ad hoc Burma Corps HQ was disbanded and IV Corps HQ, which had recently arrived in India, took over the front. The troops found themselves living out in the open under the torrential monsoon rains in extremely unhealthy circumstances. The army and civil authorities in India were very slow to respond to the needs of the troops and civilian refugees. Although the front-line units had maintained some semblance of order, many improvised units and rear-area troops had dissolved into a disorderly rout. The troops were in an alarming state, with "hair-raising stories of atrocities and sufferings".

The British Civil Government of Burma had meanwhile fallen back to Myitkyina in Northern Burma, accompanied by many British, Anglo-Indian and Indian civilians. The Governor (Reginald Dorman-Smith) and the most influential civilians were flown out from Myitkyina Airfield, with some of the sick and injured.The majority of the refugees at Myitkyina were forced to make their way to India via the unhealthy Hukawng Valley and the precipitous forested Patkai Range. Many died on the way, and when they reached India, there were several instances in which civil authorities allowed white and Eurasian civilians to continue while preventing Indians from proceeding, effectively condemning many to death. By contrast, many private individuals such as the Assam Tea Planters Association did their best to provide aid.

The Japanese advance cut off many of the Chinese troops from China. Many of them also retreated to India via the Hukawng Valley route and subsisted largely by looting, further increasing the misery of the refugees. The Chinese 38th Division however, commanded by Sun Li-jen, fought its way westward across the Chindwin, arriving at Imphal on 24 May, substantially intact although with heavy casualties. The American General Joseph Stilwell also made his way to Imphal on foot, arriving on 20 May. The remaining Chinese troops tried to return to Yunnan through remote mountainous forests but many died on the way.

The 23,000 Chinese soldiers who had retreated into India were put under the command of General Stilwell and were concentrated in camps at Ramgarh in Bihar. After recuperating they were re-equipped and retrained by American instructors.

Panlong Subtownship, a Chinese Muslim town in British Burma, was entirely destroyed by the Japanese forces during their invasion. The Hui people, Ma Guanggui became the leader of the Hui Panglong self-defense guard created by the Kuomintang government of the Republic of China. The Japanese burned Panglong, driving out the over 200 Hui households out as refugees. Yunnan and Kokang received the refugees from Panglong. One of Ma Guanggui's nephews was Ma Yeye, a son of Ma Guanghua and he narrated the history of Panglong including the Japanese attack. An account of the Japanese attack on the Hui in Panglong was written and published in 1998 by a Hui from Panglong called "Panglong Booklet".The Japanese attack caused the Hui Mu family to seek refuge in Panglong but they were driven out again to Yunnan when the Japanese attacked Panglong.

=== Halt to operations ===
The Japanese 18th and 56th Divisions pursued the Chinese into Yunnan, but were ordered to halt on the Salween River on 26 April The Japanese 33rd Division likewise halted on the Chindwin at the end of May, ending the campaign until the end of the monsoon rains. In the coastal Arakan Province, some of the Burma Independence Army reached Akyab Island before the Japanese troops. However, they also instigated inter-communal fighting between the Buddhist and Muslim populations of the province. The Japanese advance in Arakan ended just south of the Indian frontier, prompting the British military and civil authorities in and around Chittagong to implement a premature "scorched earth" policy which contributed to the Bengal Famine of 1943.

== Thai occupation of Kayah and Shan States ==
On 21 December 1941, Thailand had signed a military alliance with Japan. On 21 March 1942, the Japanese agreed that Kayah State and the Shan States were to be under Thai control. The leading elements of the Thai Phayap Army crossed the border into the Shan States on 10 May 1942. Three Thai infantry divisions and one cavalry division, supported by the Royal Thai Air Force, captured Kengtung on 27 May. The opposition had been the 93rd Division of the National Revolutionary Army, which was already cut off by the Japanese advance to the Salween River and was retreating.

On 12 July 1942, a Thai division began to occupy Kayah State. They drove the Chinese 55th Division from Loikaw, taking many Chinese prisoners. The Thai remained in control of the Saharat Thai Doem for the remainder of the war. Their troops suffered from shortage of supplies and disease, but were not subjected to Allied attacks.

== Aftermath ==
After the failure to take India, the British launched Operation Capital in December 1944 that led to the Battle of Meiktila and Mandalay in 1945 and the end of the Burma campaign.

== See also ==
- Burmah Oil Co Ltd v Lord Advocate – a landmark 1965 court case on the scope of prerogative power arising from the invasion
