= Liao Yaoxiang =

Chinese general (1906–1968)

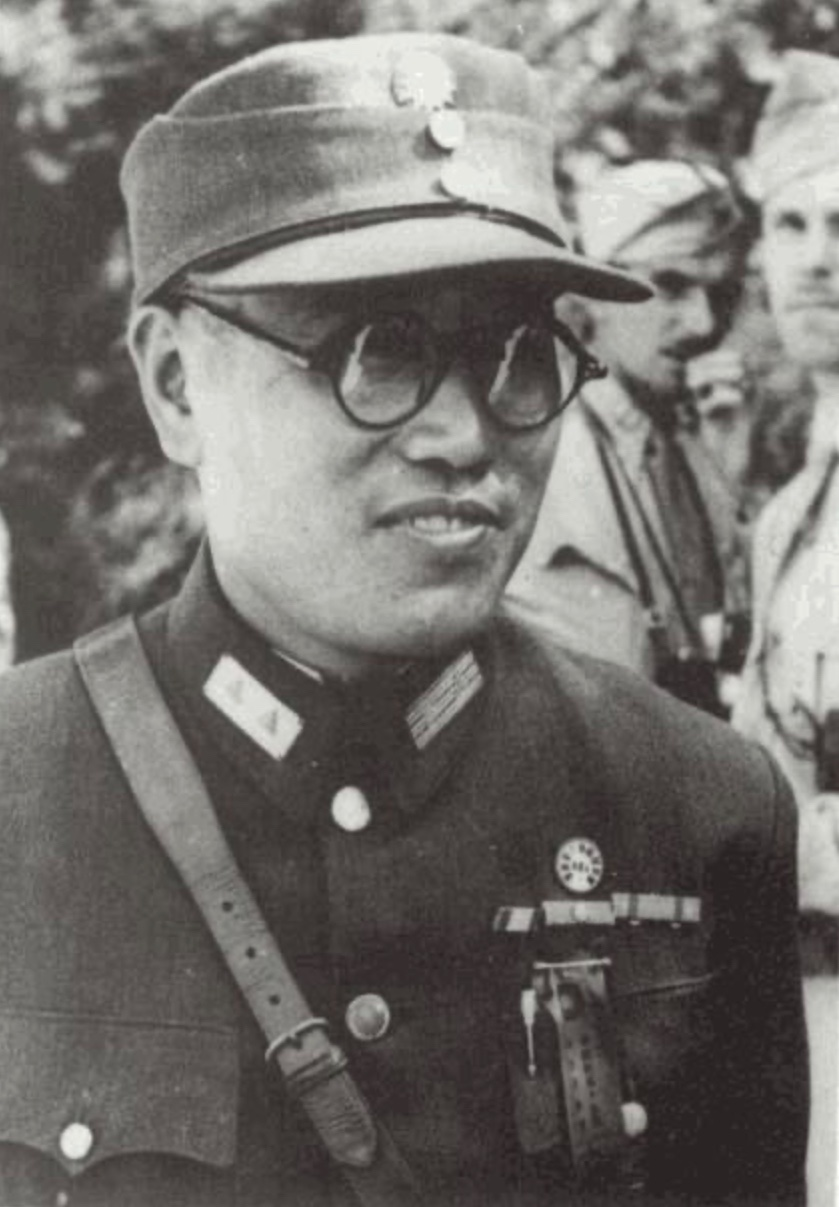
- Born: May 16, 1906; Xinshao County, Hunan, Qing China
- Died: December 2, 1968 (aged 62); Beijing, China
- Military career
- Allegiance: Republic of China
- Service years: 1926–1949
- Rank: Lieutenant General
- Nicknames: The Jungle Fox, Tiger of China, China's Patton
- Unit: Second Cavalry Company
- Commands: New 22nd Division, New 6th Army, Chinese Army in India, 9th Army Group
- Conflicts: Second Sino-Japanese War; Battle of Shanghai; Battle of Nanjing; Battle of Northern and Eastern Henan; Battle of Lanfeng; Battle of Kunlun Pass; South-East Asian theatre of World War II; Burma campaign; Battle of Yunnan-Burma Road; Battle of Toungoo; Battle of Northern Burma and Western Yunnan; Battle of West Hunan; Chinese Civil War; Campaign to Defend Siping; Battle of Jinzhou; Liaoshen Campaign
- Awards: Order of Blue Sky and White Sun (twice); Several others (see below)
- Other work: historian

Liao Yaoxiang (Chinese: 廖耀湘; pinyin: Liào Yàoxiāng; 16 May 1906 – 2 December 1968) was a high-ranking Kuomintang commander who successful fought against both the Imperial Japanese Army and Chinese Communist forces. Apart from General Sun Liren, he was one of the few Nationalist commanders who graduated from a military academy in the West. After the end of the Second Sino-Japanese War, he served as a field commander in Manchuria until his capture by Marshal Lin Biao's Manchurian Field Army in the Liaoshen Campaign. Liao was held for 12 years as a prisoner of war until 1961 and died seven years later during the Cultural Revolution.

== Early life and education ==
Liao was born on 16 May 1906 in Xinshao County, Hunan, into a family of farmers and scholars. His grandfather, Liao Guanghuan, a teacher at a private school, taught him the Confucian classics. Liao entered the county's higher primary school in 1918 and graduated in 1920, and in 1921 he was admitted to the private Yueyun Middle School in Changsha. His family could barely pay his fees, and he studied English intensively and won a long-distance race at a student sports meeting in Changsha in 1924.

In 1925, Liao planned to sit the entrance examination of the newly founded Whampoa Military Academy, but he could not raise the money for the journey to Guangzhou. He instead joined the training unit of Ye Kaixin's 3rd Division of the Hunan army, where he came first in his class and became a squad leader. In 1926, after Tang Shengzhi drove out the governor Zhao Hengti, Liao left the Hunan army. That July, he enrolled in the sixth class of the Whampoa Military Academy at its branch in Changsha, where he was assigned to the cavalry, and the following year he moved with the academy to Nanjing.

In 1929, Liao was selected for a preparatory class for officers to be sent to France, which was open to the top graduates of the academy. According to his biographers, Chiang Kai-shek approved his selection after examining the candidates personally, despite reservations about his short stature, because of his examination results. He went to France in 1930, studied French before entering military school, and graduated first in the mechanised cavalry course at Saint-Cyr in 1936. In 1935, the military theorist Jiang Baili, who was assessing Chinese military students abroad, interviewed Liao in France and praised him to Chiang Kai-shek on his return.

== Second Sino-Japanese War ==
=== Shanghai and Nanjing ===
After returning to China in the autumn of 1936, Liao was appointed a cavalry company commander with the rank of major in the training corps of the Central Military Academy, commanded by Gui Yongqing. In 1937, he was promoted to lieutenant colonel and chief of staff of the training corps, and he fought in the Battle of Shanghai and the Battle of Nanking.

After Nanjing fell on 13 December 1937, Liao escaped from the city in civilian clothes. He was turned away from the refugee camp at Qixia Temple, and with an acquaintance he took shelter in the village of Hejia, where a farmer, He Guangfeng, hid him for about two months. On 17 February 1938, He's son guided him across the Yangtze, and Liao travelled by way of Bengbu and Xuzhou to Wuhan. After the war, in 1945, he returned to the village to reward the He family.

=== Fifth Army and Kunlun Pass ===
In Wuhan, Liao was appointed a colonel and battalion commander in a corps set up to regroup officers separated from their units. In March 1938, as one of the few Chinese officers trained in mechanised warfare, he became chief of staff of the 200th Division, China's first mechanised division, with the rank of major general. In October 1938, the division was expanded into the New 11th Army, later renamed the Fifth Army, under Du Yuming, and Liao became deputy commander of its New 22nd Division under Qiu Qingquan. He was responsible for training the division, for which he wrote manuals on small-unit tactics and guerrilla warfare. A Military Affairs Commission inspection team later rated the Fifth Army first among the armies in the south-west and the New 22nd Division first within the Fifth Army.

In December 1939, the Fifth Army was sent to southern Guangxi to recapture Kunlun Pass from Japanese forces during the Battle of South Guangxi. The New 22nd Division first operated as a flanking force, cutting the road between Nanning and the pass to block Japanese reinforcements. After Qiu Qingquan was injured, Liao became acting commander and led the division's assault on the pass from 29 December, and the Japanese positions were taken on 31 December 1939. Chinese newspapers compared the victory with the capture of the pass by the Song dynasty general Di Qing in 1052. In May 1940, Liao was formally appointed commander of the New 22nd Division.

=== First Burma campaign ===
In 1942, the New 22nd Division entered Burma as part of the Chinese Expeditionary Force sent to support British forces against the Japanese invasion, crossing the border from Mangshi on 6 March. When the Chinese 200th Division was surrounded at Toungoo, Chinese accounts state that the New 22nd Division attacked the Japanese forces near Yedashe to relieve the pressure on it, and the 200th Division broke out of the encirclement at the end of March. Howard Boorman's biographical dictionary, however, states that Du Yuming did not commit the 22nd Division to a planned pincer attack and that the 200th Division was forced to withdraw on 29 March. In the following weeks, the New 22nd Division fought a series of delaying actions between Swa and Pyinmana to cover the concentration of the Chinese forces, and the United States Army's official history records that it "executed its delaying mission successfully".

After the Allied defeat in Burma, Liao's division retreated north and, unable to return to China, crossed the forested mountains known as the "Savage Mountains" to reach Ledo in India in August 1942. Many soldiers died of hunger and disease on the journey. According to Du Yuming, of the roughly 9,000 men of the division who entered Burma, about 2,000 were killed in combat and 4,000 died during the retreat, and about 3,000 reached India.

=== Northern Burma campaign ===
In India, the New 22nd Division and Sun Li-jen's 38th Division were combined as the New 1st Army and were re-equipped and trained by the Americans at Ramgarh under Joseph Stilwell. Liao studied the jungle terrain around Ledo and wrote a manual on forest warfare for his officers. In late 1943, before the offensive into northern Burma began, Chiang Kai-shek told Sun and Liao that they should remain on the defensive, according to the United States Army's official history.

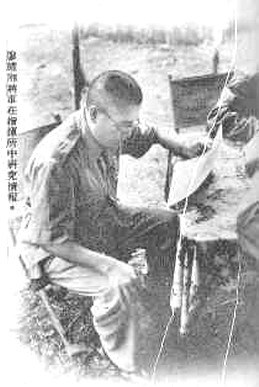
Liao at his command post (1942)

In January 1944, during the advance into the Hukawng Valley, Liao's 65th Regiment was sent to clear the Taro Plain. According to the US official history, Stilwell, dissatisfied with the regiment's slow progress, ordered Liao to relieve its commander, Colonel Fu, who was restored to command by 26 January. Chinese accounts state instead that Fu had changed Stilwell's plan of attack and that Liao supported him and took responsibility for the decision. American liaison officers counted 323 Japanese dead after the regiment encircled a Japanese battalion between 23 and 25 January, and Taro was taken at the end of the month. The division went on to take Maingkwan on 6 March 1944.

In April and May 1944, Liao's division advanced slowly down the Kamaing Road in the Mogaung valley. Stilwell suspected that Chiang was sending secret orders to Sun and Liao to limit their advance, and when Stilwell asked him directly, Liao confirmed that Chiang corresponded with him. Chinese accounts credit the division with defeating the Japanese 18th Division in the valley and killing more than 5,000 Japanese troops.

After the capture of Myitkyina in August 1944, the New 22nd, 14th and 50th divisions were combined into the New Sixth Army, with Liao as its commander. The army took part in the offensive into central Burma in late 1944, but in late 1944 it was flown back to China, apart from the 50th Division, to respond to the Japanese offensive in southern China.

=== Return to China ===
In 1945, the New Sixth Army was stationed in western Hunan under Wang Yaowu's Fourth Front Army, and in July it was assigned to guard the army headquarters and the airfield at Zhijiang. After the Japanese surrender, Liao and his senior officers attended the ceremony at Zhijiang on 21 August 1945 at which the Japanese envoy Takeo Imai arranged the surrender with He Yingqin. The New Sixth Army then served as the guard force for the surrender ceremony in Nanjing in September 1945. At the end of the year, Liao used captured Japanese medical equipment to set up a civilian hospital in Shaoyang.

== Chinese Civil War ==
In January 1946, Liao led the New Sixth Army to Northeast China, where Nationalist forces were taking over the region after the Soviet withdrawal. In March and April 1946, his forces occupied Liaoyang, Anshan and Yingkou. When the Nationalist command ordered him north to reinforce the fighting at Siping, he persuaded Du Yuming to take Benxi first to secure Shenyang, and Benxi was occupied on 3 May. He then led the right wing of the Nationalist advance on Siping, and the Communist forces withdrew from the city on 19 May. His forces entered Changchun on 23 May and by the end of the month they had occupied Jilin and other towns up to the Songhua River.

In 1947, the New Sixth Army was repeatedly moved to relieve besieged Nationalist garrisons, including Siping in June. In August 1947, Chen Cheng grouped the New Sixth, New Fifth and 49th armies into the Ninth Army Group, with Liao as its commander. In January 1948, the New Fifth Army was surrounded and destroyed at Gongzhutun without Liao moving to relieve it, and at a meeting called by Chiang Kai-shek on 10 January, Liao and Chen Cheng each blamed the other. Over the following months, Liao argued against a withdrawal from Shenyang to Jinzhou and later proposed withdrawing by sea through Yingkou instead.

After the Liaoshen campaign began on 12 September 1948, Chiang appointed Liao on 3 October commander of a force of more than 110,000 men, including the New First, New Third and New Sixth armies, which was to advance west from Shenyang to relieve Jinzhou. Liao disagreed with Chiang's plan, and his advance was delayed until Jinzhou fell to the Communists on 15 October. After failing to take Heishan between 21 and 25 October, he ordered a withdrawal towards Yingkou and then towards Shenyang, but his forces were surrounded, and they were destroyed between 26 and 28 October by Lin Biao's Manchurian Field Army. Liao hid for several days in civilian clothes before he was captured west of Heishan.

== Imprisonment and later life ==
Liao was held in prisoner of war facilities in Harbin, Fushun and Suihua, and in January 1956 he was moved to the War Criminals Management Center in Beijing. During this period, Liu Bocheng invited him to lecture at the Military Academy of the People's Liberation Army in Nanjing. He was pardoned on 25 December 1961. In 1963, he became one of the commissioners for literary and historical materials of the CPPCC National Committee, alongside other former Nationalist officers such as Du Jianshi and Kang Ze. In this post, he wrote memoir articles on his military career, including an account of the western Liaoning campaign.

During the Cultural Revolution, Liao was subjected to persecution, and on 2 December 1968 he died of a heart attack in Beijing after a struggle session, at the age of 62. In 1980, the CPPCC held a memorial service for him, together with Puyi and Wang Yaowu. His ashes were placed in the Babaoshan Revolutionary Cemetery and were later moved by his family to the United States to be buried beside his wife at Pacific View Memorial Park in Newport Beach, California.

== Personal life ==
Liao's first wife, Wang Qing, died in Hunan while he was in France. In Paris, he met and married Huang Boyong, a distant niece of Huang Xing, who later lived in Taiwan and the United States. They had one son, Liao Dingyi, a physicist who settled in the United States. After his release, Liao married a woman surnamed Zhang in Beijing, with his family's agreement, but she left him during the Cultural Revolution. He did not smoke or drink and lived frugally.

Liao's great-granddaughter, Liao Zhiyu, also known as Emma Liao, works in finance. She was managing director for technology, media and telecommunications at the investment firm Golden Brick Capital, and she later co-founded the blockchain company Ultrain.

== Awards and decorations ==
Republic of China:

- Order of Blue Sky and White Sun (twice) (26 June 1944 and 1945)
- Third Class of the Order of the Cloud and Banner (31 December 1944)
- Order of Loyalty and Diligence
- Medal of the Armed Forces, A-1
- Medal of Victory in the War of Resistance (1946)

United Kingdom:

- Companion of the Order of the Bath
- Cross awarded posthumously by Queen Elizabeth II, according to his family (1980s)

United States:

- Legion of Merit (unknown rank)
- Medal of Freedom with gold palm (1945)

His former residence in Xinshao County, is listed among the town's historic sites. In 1945, while his army was guarding the surrender negotiations at Zhijiang, Liao had a mansion built for his mother beside the North Pagoda in Shaoyang. Its main building survives, although the guardhouse and stables have been demolished, and the Beita District government lists it as a historic site.

== Writings ==
Liao wrote training manuals for his troops, including Small Unit Tactics, Forest Warfare and Urban and Village Combat. In the 1960s, he wrote memoir articles on the Burma campaigns, the Northeast and the Liaoshen campaign, which were published in the CPPCC's historical materials series.

== See also ==
- Sun Liren
- New 1st Army
- New 6th Army
- Du Yuming
- Liaoshen Campaign
