= Y-Force =

Nationalist Chinese military division in the Southeast Asian Theater of WWII

- Active: March 1943 –1945
- Country: Republic of China (1912–1949)
- Branch: National Revolutionary Army
- Size: 23 March 1943: around 227,345 personnel
- Part of: Chinese Expeditionary Force

Commanders
- Notable commanders: Chen Cheng; Long Yun

Y-Force was the South East Asia Command designation given to Chinese National Revolutionary Army forces that re-entered Burma from Yunnan in 1944 as one of the Allies fighting in Burma Campaign of World War II. It consisted of 175,000 troops divided into 15 divisions.

== History ==
=== 1942 ===
When the Japanese-Thai invaded Burma (in the first half of 1942), the Chinese Expeditionary Force in Burma, along with the other Allies forces, were forced to retreat back along their lines of communications. Most of the Chinese retreated into China but two divisions (38th and 22nd, plus fragments of three others) retreated into India where they were placed under the command of the American General Joseph Stilwell.

=== 1943–1944 ===
After being re-equipped and retrained, the Chinese divisions designated X Force formed the majority of front line forces available to Stilwell when he advanced into Northern Burma in October 1943. His intention was to capture Northern Burma and reopen land communications with China via a new spur to the Burma Road called the Ledo Road.

In support of Stilwell's offensive, in the second half of April 1944, Y-Force mounted an attack on the Yunnan front. Nearly 75,000 troops crossed the Salween river on a 300 kilometres (190 mi) front. Soon some fifteen Chinese divisions of 175,000 men, under General Wei Lihuang, were attacking the Japanese 56th Division. The Japanese forces in the North were now then fighting on two fronts in northern Burma.

By the end of May the Yunnan offensive, though hampered by the monsoon rains and lack of air support, succeeded in annihilating the garrison of Tengchung and eventually reached as far as Lungling. Strong Japanese reinforcements then counter-attacked and halted the Chinese advance.

During the monsoon season there was a pause in major offensive actions and the fighting did not resume in earnest until later in 1944.

=== 1944-1945 ===
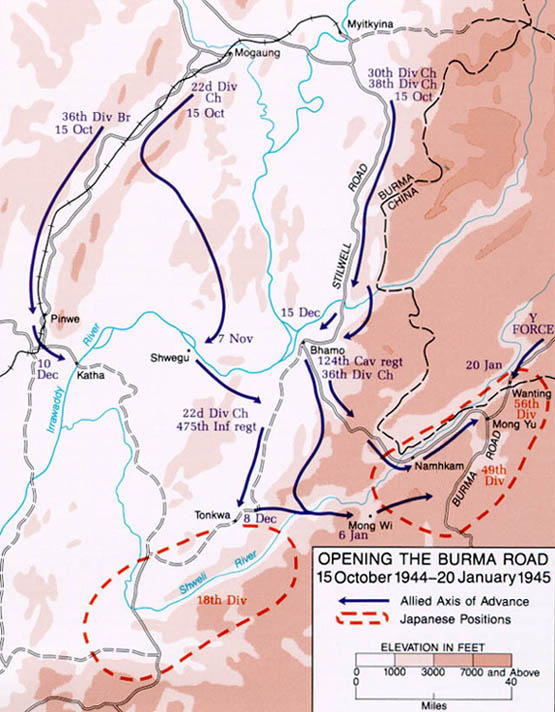
Opening the Burma Road October 1944 - January 1945

The Japanese Thirty-third Army, led by Lieutenant General Masaki Honda, defended Northern Burma against attacks from both Northern India and the Chinese province of Yunnan. The Japanese 18th Division faced the American and Chinese forces advancing south from Myitkyina and Mogaung which the British had secured in 1944, and the Japanese 56th Division faced the large Chinese Yunnan armies led by Wei Lihuang.

Although Thirty-third Army had been forced to relinquish most of the reinforcements it had received the previous year, the operations of the American-led Northern Combat Area Command under Lieutenant General Daniel Isom Sultan were limited from late 1944 onwards as many of its troops were withdrawn by air to face Japanese attacks in China. In Operation Grubworm, the Chinese 14th and 22nd Divisions were flown via Myitkyina to defend the airfields around Kunming, vital to the airlift of aid to China, nicknamed The Hump. Nevertheless, the command resumed its advance.

On the right flank of the command, the British 36th Division, advanced south down the "Railway Valley" from Mogaung to Indaw. It made contact with the Indian 19th Division near Indaw on 10 December 1944, and Fourteenth Army and NCAC now had a continuous front.

On Sultan's left, the Chinese New First Army (Chinese 30th Division and Chinese 38th Division) advanced from Myitkyina to Bhamo. The Japanese resisted for several weeks, but Bhamo fell on 15 December. The Chinese New Sixth Army (Chinese 50th Division) infiltrated through the difficult terrain between these two wings to threaten the Japanese lines of communication.

The New First Army made contact with Wei Lihuang's armies advancing from Yunnan near Hsipaw on 21 January 1945, and the Ledo road could finally be completed. The first truck convoy from India arrived in Kunming on 4 February, but by this point in the war the value of the Ledo road was uncertain, as it would not now affect the overall military situation in China.

To the annoyance of the British and Americans, Chinese leader Chiang Kai-shek ordered Sultan to halt his advance at Lashio, which was captured on 7 March. The British and Americans generally refused to understand that Chiang had to balance the needs of China as a whole against fighting the Japanese in a British colony. The Japanese had already withdrawn most of their divisions from the northern front, to face Fourteenth Army in central Burma. On 12 March, Thirty-third Army HQ was also dispatched there, leaving only the 56th Division to hold the northern front. This division was also withdrawn in late March and early April.

From 1 April, NCAC's operations stopped, and its units returned to China. The British 36th Division moved to Mandalay, which had been captured in March, and was subsequently withdrawn to India. A US-led guerrilla force, OSS Detachment 101, took over the military responsibilities of NCAC, while British civil affairs and other units such as the Civil Affairs Service (Burma) stepped in to take over its other responsibilities. Northern Burma was partitioned into Line-of-Communication areas by the military authorities.

== See also ==
- Chinese Expeditionary Force (Burma)
