= Second Battle of Siping =

1946 campaign of the Chinese Civil War

- Part of the Chinese Civil War
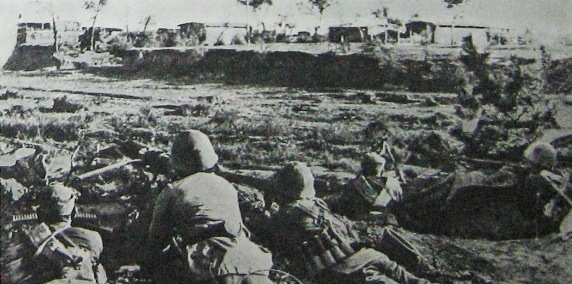
- Chinese Communist machinegun position
Date	17 April – 19 May 1946 (1 month and 2 days)
Location	Siping, Jilin, China
Result	Nationalist victory

Belligerents
(Republic of China (1912–1949)) Republic of China	Chinese Communist Party

Commanders and leaders
(Republic of China (1912–1949)) Du Yuming; (Republic of China (1912–1949)) Bai Chongxi; (Republic of China (1912–1949)) Liao Yaoxiang; (Republic of China (1912–1949)) Sun Li-jen; (Republic of China (1912–1949)) Chiang Kai-shek	Lin Biao; Mao Zedong

Strength
100,000	80,000

Casualties and losses
6,868	8,000

The Battle of Siping (Chinese: 四平保卫战) was a battle between the Nationalists and the Chinese Communist Party (CCP) for the control of Siping in 1946 during the Chinese Civil War. This campaign was characterized by the fact that the supreme commanders of both sides had overestimated their strength and set unrealistic goals, but in both cases, the frontline commanders on both sides averted the potential catastrophes by convincing their respective supreme commanders to change their original decisions.

== Prelude ==
After the defeat of Jinjiatun Campaign, the nationalists resumed their offensive with vengeance. In a short period of just two days, the nationalists were able to regroup and re-supply completely, and continued their push toward Siping. Chiang Kai-shek was determined to capture Changchun after taking Siping, and Mao Zedong was equally determined to hold Siping to the end and prevent the nationalists from capturing both Siping and Changchun. Both sides realized the upcoming campaign would be a difficult one and both sides placed one of their best field commanders in charge: Du Yuming for the nationalists and Lin Biao for the CCP.

== Order of battle ==
Attackers: nationalist order of battle:

- New 1st Army
- New 6th Army
- 71st Army
- 93rd Army
- Army-sized 207th Division of the Youth Army

Defenders: CCP order of battle:

- Wan Yi Column
- Southern Manchurian 3rd Column
- Western Manchurian 3rd Division
- Northern Manchurian 7th Division
- Shandong 1st Division
- Shandong 2nd Division
- Shandong 3rd Division
- 3rd Division of the New Fourth Army
- 8th Brigade of the New Fourth Army
- 359th Brigade

== First stage ==
Under Mao Zedong's strategy, the communists were determined to hold Siping to the end. In order to fortify the city, everyone was mobilized to build bunkers inside the city, while food, ammunition and other supplies were stacked. Lin Biao and Mao Zedong had personally inspected communist fortifications at important defensive positions such as Pagoda Mountain (Tazishan, 塔子山) and Three Lines of Groves (Sandaolinzi, 三道林子) with Peng Zhen in preparation for a prolonged campaign. Lin Biao also held a conference at Lishu County to plan the strategy of the defense: To better coordinate the defense of Siping, the communist formed an urban defense command inside the city headed by the Ma Renxing, the commander of the communist 1st Brigade, while the general headquarters retreated to the suburb at Lishu County. In order to boost the morale of defenders, a newspaper titled "Self Defense Newspaper" was created with Chen Yi, the deputy director of the political directorate of the communist general headquarters as the chief editor. The communist decided to deploy only two regiments in the city to check the nationalist attacks while the bulk of their force would be deployed in the rear, in the region between Siping and Lishu County and the region between Siping and Bamiancheng. Once the attacking nationalists were checked by the defensive force of the city in fortification, the communists would then concentrate their force to strike the weakest nationalist 71st Army.

On April 17, 1946, Nationalist frontline commander Zheng Dongguo and his deputy Liang Huasheng (梁华盛) moved their headquarters to Shuangmiaozi and ordered an immediate attack on the city. On April 18, the railways reaching the city was successfully severed. Two regiments of the 30th Division of the nationalist 71st Army under the command of Chen Mingren attacked the enemy positions from the south from Haifeng Village (Haifeng Tun, 海丰屯), Pobozi (泊脖子), and Duck Lake Pao (Ya Hu Pao, 鸭湖泡) regions, but were beaten back three times consecutively. After the initial setback, Zheng Dongguo held a military conference on April 19. The nationalist army and divisional commanders attending the conference concluded that the frontal attack on the strongly defended enemy positions was impossible, and attacks from flanks or other weak points must be selected instead in order to achieve a successful breakthrough. The railway junctions that provided the link between the 3rd Battalion of the communist 1st Regiment and the communist 56th Regiment appeared to be a good point for the breakthrough. After the conference, under heavy artillery cover, the 30th Division of the nationalist New 1st Army launched its offensive on the junction of the two communist units, and the nationalists had successfully taken the enemy position as expected. The loss of the position at the railway junction signaled that the defensive force inside the city must be strengthened and Lin Biao immediately did so, and informed the defenders in the city.

The arrival of the reinforcements greatly boosted the morale of the defenders and the advance guard of the 21st Regiment of the 7th Brigade of the communist Western Manchurian 3rd Division launched a counterassault on the nationalists with the help of other communist units, and successfully took back the positions at railway junction previously lost on the same afternoon, while inflicting heavy casualties on the nationalists in the process, and the heavy casualties stopped the offensive of the nationalist 30th Division completely. After the struggle for Siping had begun, both Chiang Kai-shek and Mao Zedong in their distant headquarters were concerned about the development and both frequently inquired the progress on the battlefield. Chiang was determined to take Changchun and thus Siping must be taken first to open the path for Changchun, while Mao felt that Siping must be held at all cost and on April 22, Mao telegraphed Lin Biao to order him to hold on and wait for the campaign to turn for the better. From April 18, through April 26, 3 divisions from the nationalist New 1st Army and the 71st Army took turns to assault the enemy positions, but were all beaten back by the enemy in favorable terrain. By the evening of April 26, 1946, heavy casualties forced the offensive of the nationalist 71st Army to a complete stop, while that of the nationalist New 1st Army was reduced to skirmishes.

After failing to make significant progress, the nationalists resorted to artillery to shell the enemy, but this resulted in a disastrous failure. The terrain favored the defenders in that there were relatively few artillery positions outside the city for shelling the city, and defenders were well aware these positions. The nationalists enjoyed numerical superiorities in artillery so these positions were jammed with nationalist batteries. The enemy defending the city, on the other hand, had fewer artilleries and thus was forced to move around whenever and wherever they were needed, and such frequent and rapid movement to the next new position where artillery support was needed helped the enemy artilleries from being shelled by the nationalist counter-artillery fire. In contrast, nationalist artillery was the first to fire for most of the time, but after firing, they were not able to move around due to limited positions available and the high concentration of batteries deployed in the few available positions. As a result, the nationalist batteries became victims of enemy counter-artillery fire and suffered great loss. When nationalists were forced to withdraw their batteries from the few available artillery positions to avoid losses, the enemy was out of range. As a result, the attacking nationalists lost the artillery duel. Mao was happy that the nationalist attack was beaten back again, and on April 27, 1946, telegraphed Lin Biao to praise him and his troop, and asked Lin Biao to deploy one or two more regiments to develop Siping into Madrid in the East.

== Second stage ==
To better defend the city, Lin Biao redeployed his forces: the 21st Regiment of the 7th Brigade of the communist Western Manchurian 3rd Division, the 67th Regiment and the 2nd Regiment of the Artillery Brigade of the Northern Manchurian 7th Division entered the city to boost the defense, the 55th Regiment and the 58th Regiment of the 19th Brigade of the communist Wan Yi Column was deployed in southern suburb, the Shandong 1st Division and 2nd Division were deployed in the northwestern suburb, the 7th Brigade and the 10th Brigade of the Western Manchurian 3rd Division were deployed in the eastern suburb, and 359th Brigade stationed at Gongzhuling as reserve. The 7th Brigade and the 8th Brigade of the communist Southern Manchurian 3rd Column had also successfully severed the nationalist supply line between Changtu and Kaiyuan, Liaoning, thus slowed down the nationalist push on the city. To distract nationalist forces elsewhere and preventing them from reinforcing their comrades-in-arms attacking Siping, other communist units launched separate attacks on the nationalist positions, and by April 18, all of the final nationalist strongholds in Changchun region fell into the enemy hands, and on April 25, Qiqihar fell into the enemy hands, and finally on April 28, all of the final nationalist strongholds in the Harbin region fell into the enemy hands. However, such success only strengthened Chiang Kai-shek's resolve to take Changchun after Siping.

After the initial success of repelling the nationalist attack, the communist high command became overconfident and daydreamed that within ten days, the communist defenders of Siping would leave the city and annihilate the elite nationalist New 1st Army. On April 28, 1946, the communist high command telegraphed the entire communist force defending the city by praising them for their success in defending Siping and hoped that they would continue their effort for the final victory, turning Siping into another Madrid. Lin Biao was well aware that the communist force at the time was not capable of fighting with the New 1st Army face to face, and telegraphed back on April 29, claiming that it was impossible to annihilate the New 1st Army at Siping, though this elite nationalist force would definitely be annihilated in Northeast China, it was not the time when defending Siping. However, the unscathed large communist force in other areas was quite capable of badly mauling the exhausted New 1st Army after the fierce battles at Siping in an ambush at the favorable terrain and under the cover of darkness and bad weather, and such ambush was planned later on the presumed nationalist attack on Changchun. Du Yuming, the brilliant nationalist commander would not provide the enemy with such opportunity they wanted and thus would consequently foil the enemy's hope by successfully convincing Chiang Kai-shek instead of immediately continuing to take Changchun after taking Siping as originally planned, the exhausted nationalists would stop at Siping regroup and re-supply, hence avoiding any possible ambush or counterattacks by the enemy.

Confident that the nationalists would be able to completely annihilate the communist enemy and would be able to first take Northeast China and then the entire China afterward, on April 30, 1946, Chiang Kai-shek turned down George Marshall's peace proposal that was agreed by the communists and neutral political parties in China, and both the nationalists and the communists realized that any gains in the following peace negotiations would come from the victories in the battlefield. On April 1, Mao Zedong telegrammed Lin Biao, giving the latter the following orders: First, Lin Biao would have the overall control of the communist political and military power in Northeast China and if help was needed, Gao Gang would be sent. Second, the nationalists had turned down the George Marshall's peace proposal that was agreed by the communists and neutral political parties and insisted on taking Changchun, so Siping and Benxi must be held to the end so that the enemy (nationalists) would exhaust its supplies and ammunitions to the point that it would take at least six months to resupply, and thus providing time for us (communists) to strengthen ourselves (communists) at Changchun and Harbin for better positions in the peace negotiation followed. Third, concentrating our (communist) force to achieve victory.

After setbacks outside Siping, the nationalists believed that the situation in Northeast China depended on the successful capture of the city, and after Siping was taken from the enemy, the overall situation for the nationalist in Northeast China would immediately be improved significantly, and thus the city must be taken at all costs. The elite nationalist New 6th Army under the command of Liao Yaoxiang was first airlifted by the United States Army Air Forces to Northeast China, and made its move to Siping from Kaiyuan, Xifeng, and the Town of Yehe Nara. With the arrival of new reinforcements, the nationalists planned to concentrate their forces to take Siping and then take Yongji and Changchun. In preparation, the 14th Division and the 22nd Division of the nationalist New 6th Army was deployed to Kaiyuan from Liaoyang and Benxi, the nationalist 93rd Army was also deployed to Northeast China from Beijing. In addition, the nationalist air force concentrated all of its available aircraft in the region to support the offensive on the ground.

== Third stage ==
On May 15, Du Yuming gave the order to launch a general assault on Siping and declared to his men that the city must be taken this time. The nationalist assault came in three fronts: the 88th Division and the New 6th Army of the nationalist right front would attack the enemy's left flank, targeting cities including Gongzhuling, Meihekou, Changchun and Qitamu (其塔木). The New 1st Army on the nationalist central front would directly attack city and then would take Shuangcheng and Dehui after taking Siping, and continue its push to the regions north of the Songhua River. Two divisions of the 71st Army on the nationalist left front would attack the enemy's right flank, targeting Zhengjiatun and Shuangcheng. On May 15, 1946, with ten times numerical superiority and additional technical superiority, the nationalist 50th Division at the left flank of the nationalist central front launched its fierce attacks under air cover and air support on the peak # 258 held by the enemy, located to the east of Siping and south of Hafu (哈福). After severe casualties, the enemy was forced to give up peak #258.

On May 17, Du Yuming ordered the 195th Division in reserve into action and soon took Hafu, and surrounded the most critical point of defense of the city, the highest point in the east, a hill called Pagoda Mountain (Ta Zi Shan, 塔子山) located 10 km to the southeast of the city. Excited about the progress, Du reported to Chiang Kai-shek that Siping would be taken soon. Chiang, on the other hand, was not certain and worried that the nationalist offensive would once more suffer a setback, sent the nationalist Deputy Chief of the General Staff Bai Chongxi to Northeast China to investigate. The night Bai reached Shenyang, Bai told Du Yuming that Chiang had felt the battle to capture Siping took too long, and he could not wait any longer. As long as Siping was captured, the nationalists would be in a better position on the peace negotiation table than the communists and taking Changchun would be after taking Siping.

Both sides were well aware of the importance of the hill and the nationalists launched multiple assaults on the hill, and all were beaten back by the communist 19th Regiment of the 7th Brigade of the Western Manchurian 3rd Division defending the hill. The nationalists then concentrated all available firepower to bombard the enemy position with an area around a hundred square metres at the hilltop at a rate of more than 30 rounds per minute, and under the cover of intense artillery shelling, the nationalist New 6th Army under its commander Liao Yaoxiang attacked the hill from three sides in the east, the south, and the west. After beating back the nationalist attacks for six times, it was obvious reinforcements were needed. The communist 10th Brigade was ordered to reinforce Pagoda Mountain (Ta Zi Shan, 塔子山) but they were delayed when crossing the Liao River, and this was the most important reason that caused the eventual abandonment of city.

It was obvious that it would be only a matter of time before the communist stronghold at Pagoda Mountain (Ta Zi Shan, 塔子山) would be taken by the attacking nationalists, and with neither the technical nor the numerical superiority, Lin Biao believed it was much more important to preserve the communist strength for the future and he radioed Mao Zedong on May 18, to report the situation and intention to abandon the city. After sending the message, Lin Biao ordered a general withdraw without waiting for the Mao's reply, and by midnight, the general withdrawal was completed in an orderly fashion and in total secrecy. The next morning, the nationalists secured the city, and only after that did Mao's reply came on May 19, in which Mao finally changed his mind and agreed with Lin Biao. Had Lin Biao waited, his entire force in the city would be annihilated.

== Outcome ==
The brilliance of the frontline commanders on both sides was obvious toward the end of the campaign and in its aftermath. Chiang Kai-shek was overjoyed with the capture of Siping and ordered the Nationalists to immediately continue their attack and capture Changchun without hesitation, so that the Communist forces would not have the opportunity to regroup. Du Yuming was well aware that his exhausted forces needed to rest and regroup for some time before launching any further attacks on the enemy. Furthermore, Du and his fellow officers were keenly aware that the majority of the enemy forces in the rural regions remained unscathed and were waiting to ambush them in the open if the exhausted Nationalists ventured into terrain hostile to mechanized forces. Du and his officers were determined not to give the enemy the opportunity they had been waiting for. In a rare example among Chiang's most trusted subordinates, Du Yuming refused to carry out Chiang's order and successfully convinced him to halt the planned offensive, allowing the Nationalists to consolidate their gains in Northeast China and thereby foiling the enemy's hopes of launching a successful ambush.

Equally brilliant, the Communist commander Lin Biao dared to ignore Mao Zedong's order and withdraw from the city on his own, thereby successfully avoiding the total annihilation of his defending force by a numerically and technically superior adversary. However, Lin Biao was more fortunate than his counterpart in that he did not have to convince Mao of the wisdom of his decision and actions, because Mao had realized his error and concurred with what Lin Biao had done. Nevertheless, neither Chiang's original plan to continue the advance toward Changchun nor Mao's original plan to hold Siping materialized, and thus the campaign ended in a stalemate.

== Campaign to Defend Siping vs. Battle of Siping ==
The Nationalists considered this campaign to include the Battle of Siping, but this was misleading since the strategies for both sides were totally different from the strategies in this campaign and unrelated to each other. Furthermore, the commanders for both sides in this campaign were not the same as the commanders in the Battle of Siping. More importantly, the Nationalists in the Battle of Siping were only nominally Nationalists, because they were former Nationalist (mostly warlords under nominal Nationalist control) turned Japanese puppet regime forces who rejoined the Nationalists after World War II, combined with local bandits recruited by the Nationalist administrators to fight off communists. Chiang Kai-shek's forces did not have the resources to rapidly deploy forces into the region, so he relied on a combination of warlord forces and former bandits in the Battle of Siping. In fact, in the Battle of Siping, Chiang's forces did not participate in the battle.

== See also ==
- Outline of the Chinese Civil War
- National Revolutionary Army
- History of the People's Liberation Army
