= Sun Li-jen =

Chinese general (1900–1990)

- 孫立人
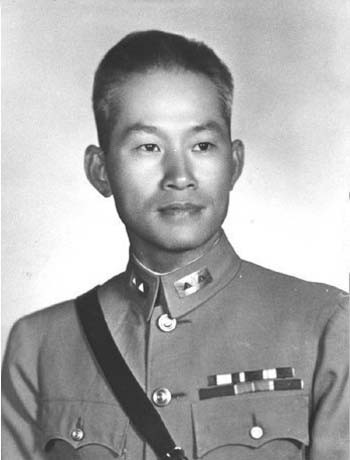
- Sun Li-jen

Commander of the Republic of China Army
- In office March 1950 – June 1954
- Preceded by: Gu Zhutong
- Succeeded by: Huang Chieh

Personal details
- Born: December 8, 1900 Jinniu, Lujiang County, Luzhou Fu, Anhui, Qing China (present-day Lujiang County, Chaohu, Anhui, China)
- Died: November 19, 1990 (aged 89) Taichung, Taiwan
- Education: Tsinghua University (BS); Purdue University (BE); Virginia Military Institute (BA)
- Occupation: Military officer, politician
- Awards: Order of Blue Sky and White Sun; Order of the British Empire; Several others (see below)
- Nickname: "Rommel of the East"

Military service
- Allegiance: Republic of China
- Branch/service: National Revolutionary Army
- Years of service: 1927–1955
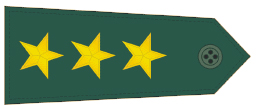
- Rank: General
- Commands: Tax Police Regiment; New 38th Division; New 1st Army; Republic of China Army
- Battles/wars: Second Sino-Japanese War; Battle of Shanghai; South-East Asian theatre of World War II; Burma campaign; Battle of the Yunnan–Burma Road; Battle of Yenangyaung; Battle of Northern Burma and Western Yunnan; Siege of Myitkyina; Chinese Civil War; Second Battle of Siping

Sun Li-jen (traditional Chinese: 孫立人; simplified Chinese: 孙立人; pinyin: Sūn Lìrén; art name Chung-neng (仲能; Zhòngnéng); courtesy name Fu-min (撫民; Fǔmín); December 8, 1900 – November 19, 1990) was a Chinese National Revolutionary Army general best known for his leadership in the Second Sino-Japanese War and the Chinese Civil War. His military achievements earned him the laudatory nickname "Rommel of the East". Sun's commands were credited with effectively confronting Japanese troops in the 1937 Battle of Shanghai and in 1943–1944 during the Burma campaign; his New 1st Army was known as the "Best Army under Heaven" (天下第一軍).

A graduate of the Virginia Military Institute, Sun did not have the full confidence of Chiang Kai-shek, possibly because of his foreign military training. He was relieved of battle command in the Chinese Civil War in 1946, and although he was made commander-in-chief in 1950 after the retreat of the Nationalist government to Taiwan, he was given only ceremonial roles. He was charged with conspiracy in 1955 and spent 33 years under virtual house arrest, released only after president Chiang Ching-kuo's death in 1988.

== Early life and education ==
Sun was born on December 8, 1900, in Jinniu, Lujiang County, Anhui. His father Sun Xize was a juren who served as prefect of Dengzhou and later as a judge in Shandong. In 1913, Sun entered the Tsinghua School, the forerunner of Tsinghua University, which prepared students for study in the United States on Boxer Indemnity scholarships, and he studied civil engineering there. He played for the Chinese team that won the basketball tournament at the 1921 Far Eastern Championship Games, and he took part in the May Fourth Movement of 1919.

After graduating from Tsinghua in 1923, Sun earned a civil engineering degree from Purdue in 1924 and worked briefly as an engineer for an American bridge company. He then entered the Virginia Military Institute and graduated with the class of 1927. After touring Britain, Germany, France and Japan to observe their armed forces, he returned to China in 1928.

== Military career ==
=== Tax Police and the war with Japan ===
On his return, Sun joined the National Revolutionary Army and taught military training at the Central Political Institute. In 1932, he was given command of the 4th Regiment of the Tax Police Corps, a force raised by Finance Minister T. V. Soong that became one of the best trained and equipped units in the army. He developed a training system of his own, combining Chinese and American methods, which became known as "Sun's drill manual".

In 1937, Sun led the regiment in the Battle of Shanghai. On November 3, he was badly wounded by artillery fire near Suzhou Creek, and he was taken to Hong Kong for treatment. After recovering, he fought in the Battle of Wuhan in 1938. The Tax Police were then rebuilt as an anti-smuggling corps of the salt tax administration under his command and trained at Duyun in Guizhou. In December 1941, part of the corps was transferred to the army as the New 38th Division of the 66th Army, with Sun as its commander.

=== First Burma campaign ===
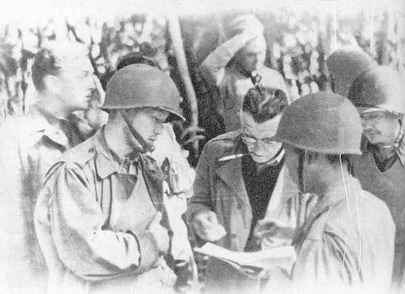
Sun with Joseph Stilwell in Burma

In 1942, the New 38th Division entered Burma as part of the Chinese Expeditionary Force. In April 1942, during the Battle of Yenangyaung, Japanese forces cut off the 1st Burma Division near the town's oilfields. Sun sent the division's 113th Regiment under Colonel Liu Fang-wu to relieve the British, and William Slim placed British tanks and artillery under Sun's command for the attack. Chinese official accounts credit the action with rescuing about 7,000 British troops and some 500 missionaries, journalists and others. The Taiwanese military historian Ho Shih-tung has argued that the fighting was directed by Liu, with Sun giving only overall guidance.

For his leadership in Burma, Sun was appointed an honorary Commander of the Order of the British Empire and received the Legion of Merit from President Franklin D. Roosevelt. When the Allied front collapsed in May 1942, Sun took his division west into India, while the forces of Du Yuming withdrew into China against Sun's advice and suffered heavy losses.

=== India and North Burma ===
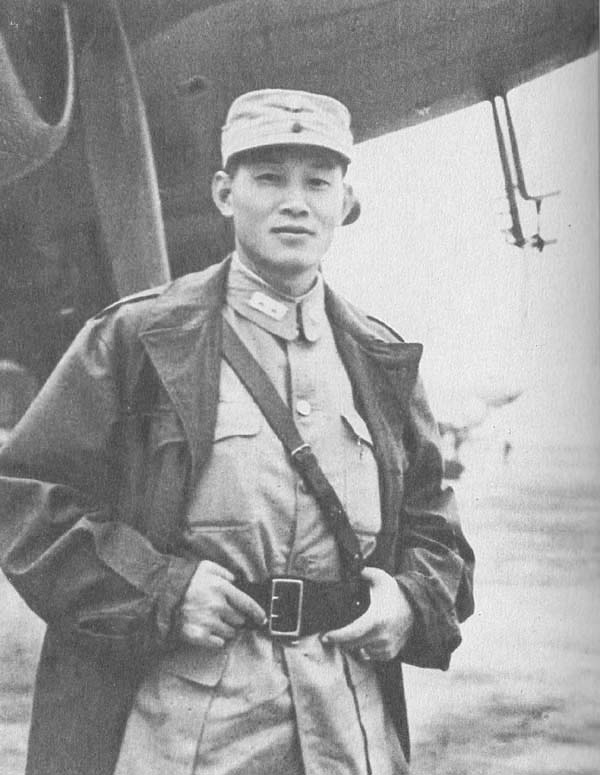
Sun in India

In India, the division was retrained at Ramgarh and became part of the New 1st Army, which formed part of X Force under Stilwell's command. In late 1943, it fought in the Hukawng Valley of northern Burma. According to the American official historians Charles F. Romanus and Riley Sunderland, Stilwell blamed the slow progress on Sun's reluctance to maneuver, and an American liaison officer concluded that Sun preferred to avoid defeat rather than take risks to win. Stilwell also suspected that Chiang Kai-shek was secretly urging Sun and Liao Yaoxiang to move slowly. In May 1944, Sun's 112th Regiment outflanked the Japanese and seized a major supply center on the road to Kamaing, one of the factors that left the Japanese 18th Division in serious difficulty. According to Boorman's Biographical Dictionary of Republican China, Stilwell came to regard Sun as the most capable Chinese field commander of the war.

Sun was then promoted to command the New 1st Army. Its 38th Division led the advance on Bhamo, which the Japanese garrison abandoned on December 15, 1944. The army occupied Namhkam on January 16, 1945, and later that month linked up at Mongyu with the Yunnan force of Wei Lihuang, reopening the road between India and China. It went on to take Lashio in March 1945.

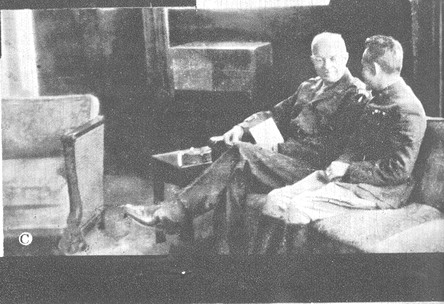
Sun and Dwight D. Eisenhower in Europe in 1945

In 1945, at the invitation of General Eisenhower, Sun toured the battlefields of Europe. On September 7, 1945, he led the New 1st Army into Guangzhou to accept the surrender of the Japanese 23rd Army.

=== Chinese Civil War ===
In 1946, the New 1st Army was sent to Manchuria, where it took Siping on May 19 and Changchun on May 22. Sun repelled several attacks by Lin Biao's forces, but he lost his command in 1947 after a falling-out with his superior Du Yuming. O. Edmund Clubb, the American consul general in Mukden, later recalled Sun as a very able general who was regarded as an outsider because of his VMI education and was given a lesser role than his abilities deserved. In August 1947, Sun became deputy commander-in-chief of the army and head of the Army Training Command, and in November he moved the training command to Fengshan in southern Taiwan.

== Taiwan ==
=== Commander-in-chief ===
According to Global Views Monthly, General Douglas MacArthur asked Sun during a 1949 visit to Japan to take responsibility for the defense of Taiwan, but Sun declined and reported the conversation to Chen Cheng. In September 1949, Chiang appointed Sun commander of the Taiwan Defense Command, and troops trained by Sun held the front line in the Battle of Guningtou that October. In March 1950, Sun became commander-in-chief of the army. According to the Central News Agency, his work included modernizing the army, reorganizing the troops evacuated from the mainland, and helping to create the conscription and reserve officer systems.

Chiang Ching-kuo, who headed his father's secret police from 1950 to 1965, introduced a Soviet-style system of political officers into the army, which Sun opposed. Sun fell out of favor with Chiang Kai-shek amid rumors that the United States wanted him to replace Chiang. US diplomat Dean Rusk later said that in June 1950 he had received a secret message from Sun about overthrowing Chiang, but Global Views Monthly noted that Rusk's account conflicted with some declassified documents. The historian Chen Li-wen found that Chiang's diaries show a lasting belief that Sun relied on American backing. In June 1954, Sun was moved from the army command to the post of chief of staff to the president.

=== 1955 case ===
On May 25, 1955, Major Kuo Ting-liang, a former subordinate of Sun's, was arrested at the army academy in Fengshan. The authorities accused him of being a Communist agent and of planning, with other officers, to use a troop review at Pingtung to press demands on Chiang by force. On August 20, 1955, Chiang removed Sun from his post. A nine-member committee headed by Vice President Chen Cheng found Sun negligent and named Kuo as the main culprit, and on October 20 Chiang ordered that Sun be spared further punishment but kept under the supervision of the Ministry of National Defense. More than 300 people were implicated in the case, and more than 30 were sentenced to prison or to death.

A separate five-member team of the Control Yuan concluded that Kuo's activities did not amount to sedition and that Sun had not known of Kuo's intentions. It found that Sun and Kuo had only been preparing a military reform proposal for Chiang, and its report stayed classified until 2001. According to Boorman, the alleged plot may have been no more than a plan to petition Chiang to abolish the system of political officers.

=== House arrest ===
In 1956, Sun was moved to a house on Xiangshang Road in Taichung, where he lived under guard for the next 33 years. Chiang Ching-kuo died in January 1988, and less than two months later Sun gave an interview in which he said that he wanted his name cleared more than he wanted his freedom. On March 20, 1988, Defense Minister Cheng Wei-yuan announced that Sun was free, on the orders of President Lee Teng-hui.

== Death ==
Sun died in Taichung on November 19, 1990, of pneumonia and sepsis. He was buried at Dongshan Cemetery in Taichung. He had reserved a plot at the cemetery he had built in 1947 at Matougang in Guangzhou for 4,543 New 1st Army soldiers who died in Burma and India, and he had said he wished to be buried with them. In October 2025, his second son Sun Tien-ping applied to the Taiwan Affairs Office to move his remains to the mainland, and Taiwan's Mainland Affairs Council said the decision rested with the family.

== Rehabilitation ==
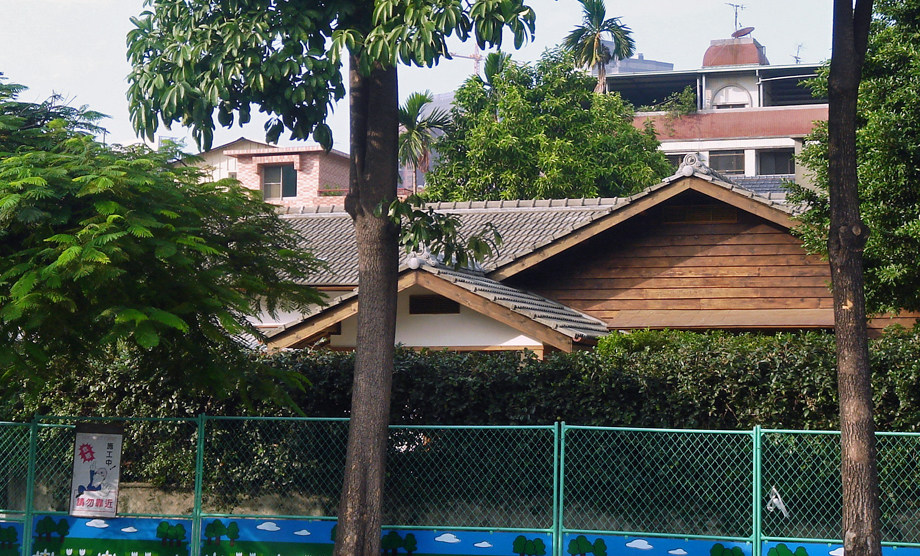
Sun's former residence in Taichung

In 2000, the historian Chu Hung-yuan of the Academia Sinica made public a 1955 document of the Control Yuan investigators, which concluded that it was impossible for Sun to have started a mutiny. On January 9, 2001, the Control Yuan approved Chu's report clearing Sun's name. The report found no evidence that Kuo had been a Communist spy, and it concluded that his death in 1991, officially a fall from a moving train, had been caused by a blow to the head. In January 2011, President Ma Ying-jeou visited Sun's former residence and apologized to his family. In July 2014, a further Control Yuan investigation found that Kuo had been tortured and that his confession had been extracted under pressure and falsely dated.

Sun's house in Taichung was designated a historic building in 2002, and a memorial hall was opened there in 2010. In 2018, it became the first building in Taichung to be listed as a commemorative building under the Cultural Heritage Preservation Act. In 2017, Representative Ro Khanna honored Sun on the floor of the United States House of Representatives.

== Assessments ==
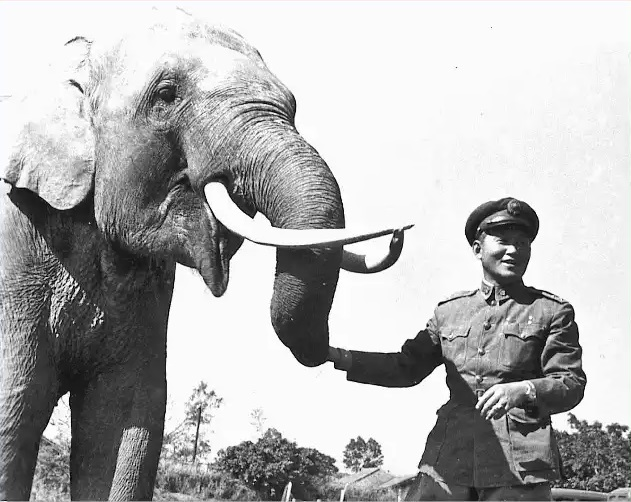
Sun with the army elephant Lin Wang

In August 1943, George C. Marshall told T. V. Soong that every report, including Stilwell's, described Sun as a very fine officer, and he asked whether Sun could be given a larger command. In July 1947, Albert C. Wedemeyer told the Chinese ambassador Wellington Koo that Sun was better suited than Du Yuming to command in the northeast. Chiang Kai-shek's diaries, by contrast, show a lasting hostility towards Sun. The philosopher Xu Fuguan found Sun stubborn and disdainful of much of the military establishment, but he praised him for sharing the hardships of his men and for his personal honesty.

== Personal life ==
In 1919, Sun married Gong Xitao in a match arranged by his family, and in 1930 he married Chang Ching-ying. Neither marriage produced children, and in 1952 Chang Ching-ying arranged for him to take Chang Mei-ying as a further wife. Chang Mei-ying was the mother of his four children, Sun Chung-ping, Sun An-ping, Sun Tien-ping and Sun Tai-ping. His younger daughter Sun Tai-ping became a professor at Duke University and was elected to the National Academy of Sciences in 2024.

== Promotions ==
- Lieutenant colonel (May 28, 1935)
- Colonel (February 10, 1943)
- Major general (March 8, 1945)
- Lieutenant general (September 22, 1948)
- General second class (May 24, 1951)

== Awards and honors ==
=== National ===
- Order of Blue Sky and White Sun (1944/1945)
- Fourth Class of the Order of the Sacred Tripod (with Special Cravat) (1947)
- Third Class of the Order of the Cloud and Banner (with Yellow Grand Cordon) (1947)
- Fourth Class of the Order of the Cloud and Banner (with Special Cravat) (1943)
- Order of Loyalty and Diligence (1947)
- Medal of the Armed Forces, A-1
- Medal of Victory in the War of Resistance (1946)

=== Foreign ===
- Knight Commander of the Order of the British Empire (United Kingdom, 1943)
- Commander of the Legion of Merit (United States, 1948)
- Medal of Freedom with silver palm (United States, 1945)

== See also ==
- Chinese Army in India
