= X Force (Chinese Expeditionary Force) =

Nationalist Chinese military division in the Southeast Asian Theater of WWII

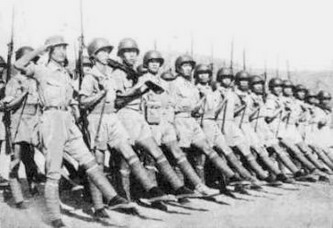
US equipped Chinese Army in India.

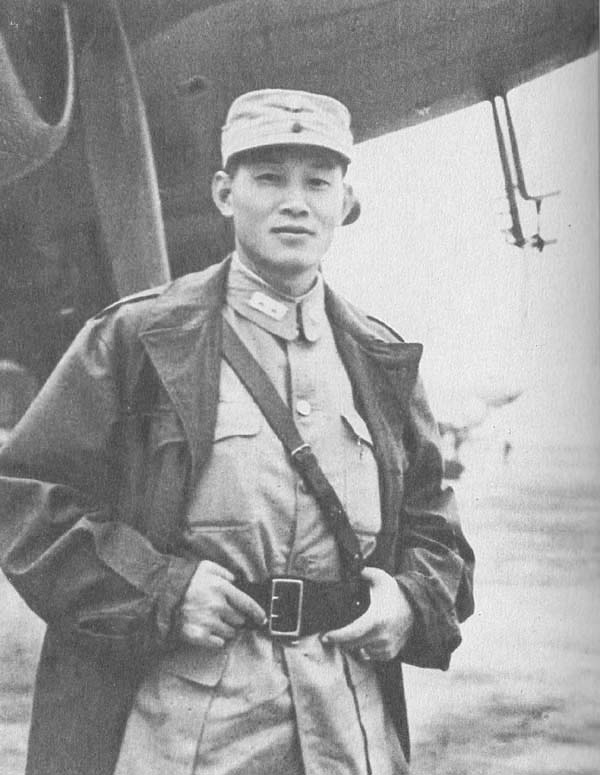
Chinese Army in India, Commander Sun Li-Jen

X Force was the portion of the National Revolutionary Army's Chinese Expeditionary Force that retreated from Burma into British India in 1942. Chiang Kai-shek sent troops into Burma from Yunnan in 1942 to assist the British in holding back the Japanese. These Chinese forces became broken up, and in the retreat out of Burma part of these forces entered India. These were cantoned at Ramgarh Cantonment in the Bihar Province (now in Jharkhand State), brought up to five-Division strength (Chinese New 30th, New 22nd, New 38th, 14th and 50th Divisions), and re-equipped and re-trained by American instructors at British expense.

Each of the five divisions had about 15,000 troops, for a total of 75,000 for the whole force. The New 30th and New 38th Divisions formed the New 1st Army which was commanded by Sun Li-Jen. The New 22nd, 14th and 50th Divisions formed the New 6th Army which was commanded by Liao Yaoxiang. They were named X Force and used by General Joseph Stilwell as the spearhead of his drive to open a land route to China (the Ledo Road). The outstanding Chinese commander in X Force was General Sun Li-Jen, who led the Chinese 38th Division and was praised by the British Fourteenth Army Commander General (later Field Marshal) William Slim in his book Defeat into Victory. The Chinese forces which re-entered Burma from Yunnan were correspondingly known as Y Force.

== China Defensive 1942-1945 ==
China Defensive 1942-1945 was an essay prepared for the United States Army Center of Military History by Mark D. Sherry.

The U.S. Army's main role in China was to keep China in the war through the provision of advice and materiel assistance. As long as China stayed in the war, millions of Imperial Japanese Army soldiers could be tied down on the Asian mainland instead of being used to fight on other fronts. Success was thus measured differently than in most theaters. How well both General Stilwell and General Wedemeyer persuaded the theater commander-in-chief, Generalissimo Chiang, to support U.S. strategic goals, and how effectively U.S. training and material support could build selected Chinese divisions into modern tactical units, capable of standing up to the Japanese, were secondary objectives. What mattered most was simply keeping China in the war against Japan. The major U.S. failure in China was logistical: America was not able to meet its lend-lease commitments. The closing of the Burma Road in 1942 made it impossible to deliver sufficient equipment, weapons, and munitions to build the dream of a well-equipped and trained thirty-division Chinese force.

== See also ==
- India-China Division
- China Burma India Theater
- Northern Combat Area Command
- New 1st Army
- Burma Road
- V Force
- Z Force (Burma)
- Chinese Expeditionary Force (Burma)
