= Namhkam =

Namhkam is the name of several towns in Myanmar (Burma):

- Namhkam, Shan State
- Namhkam, Hkamti, Sagaing Region
- Namkham, Homalin, Sagaing Region
