= New 6th Army =

- Country: Republic of China
- Allegiance: Kuomintang
- Branch: (Republic of China (1912–1949)) National Revolutionary Army
- Type: Infantry
- Role: Combined arms Jungle warfare Mountain warfare Raiding
- Size: Field army
- Part of: National Revolutionary Army
- Engagements: Second Sino-Japanese War; Burma Campaign; Chinese Civil War; Campaign to Defend Siping; Liaoshen Campaign

Commanders
- Notable commanders: Liao Yaoxiang

New 6th Army was a Chinese combat command involved in the Burma Campaign of World War II, and later, the Chinese Civil War.

They operated in the Shan States and the Karen State of eastern Burma. The New 6th Army's General and Supreme Commander was Liao Yaoxiang.

The New 6th Army was among the top five nationalist crack units (The other four included New 1st Army, Reorganized 11th Division (army-sized, formerly known as the 18th Army and later reverted to its original designation), Reorganized 74th Division (army sized, formerly known as the 74th Army), and the 5th Army.

== Notable facts ==
- On April 23, 1942, the 6th Army was involved in skirmishes with Japanese forces, and were forced to retreat from Taunggyi, toward the Yunnan Province. Two days later, they returned and beat back the Japanese, recapturing the location in the process.
- On March 31, 1945, the British 36th Division and units of the Chinese 6th Army, captured Kyaukme, which is northwest of Mandalay. A fortnight before, the 6th army gained control of Hsipaw, 80 kilometres southwest of Lashio.
- Mobile medical support for the command was provided by a unit assigned by Britain; one notable member of the unit was the "Burma Surgeon" — Gordon Seagrave.
- The command worked with the USAFCT (U.S. Army Forces, China Theater) in redeploying over 2200 animals (including horses and mules) by aerial transport from Burma into Chan-i. The effort was executed in January 1945. In April of the same year those animals were airlifted from Chan-i to Chih-chiang.
- One of the US Army liaison officers, Desmond Fitzgerald, later went on to have a notable CIA career, including involvement in the attempted assassination of Fidel Castro.
