= New 1st Army =

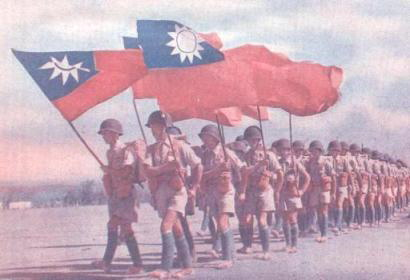
- New 1st Army parade in India.
- Active: 1943–1949
- Country: China
- Allegiance: Kuomintang
- Type: Infantry
- Role: Combined arms Jungle warfare Mountain warfare Raiding
- Size: Field Army; New 38th Division; New 22nd Division; New 30th Division
- Part of: National Revolutionary Army
- Nickname: First Army Under Heaven
- Equipment: M1A1 Thompson; M116 howitzer M2 mortar M1 carbine Karabiner 98k
- Engagements: Second Sino-Japanese War; Burma Campaign; Siege of Myitkyina; Battle of Mogaung; Chinese Civil War

Commanders
- Notable commanders: Sun Li-jen

The New 1st Army (traditional Chinese: 新一軍; simplified Chinese: 新一军) was a prominent military unit of the Chinese National Revolutionary Army. It was nicknamed the "First Army Under Heaven" during the Chinese Civil War and played a significant role during the Sino-Japanese War (1937-1945), where it inflicted substantial casualties on the Imperial Japanese Army.

== History ==
Formed from the X Force, particularly the New 38th Division, the New 1st Army was among the top five Nationalist crack units. The other four included the New 6th Army, the Reorganized 11th Division (army-sized, formerly known as the 18th Army and later reverted to its original designation), the Reorganized 74th Division (army sized, formerly known as the 74th Army), and the 5th Army.

After the New 38th Division under Sun Li-jen and New 22nd Division under Liao Yao-hsiang retreated to India from Burma in the first phase of the Burma Campaign, the two divisions obtained American equipment and training at Ramgarh, India. There the New 1st Army was formed in February 1943 with the three divisions: the New 38th, the New 22nd and the New 30th. Lieutenant-General Qiu Qingquan was appointed its commander, but was soon replaced by Lieutenant-General Cheng Tung-kuo. Sun Li-jen served as the deputy commander but took over tactical command at the beginning of the second phase of the Burma Campaign. In May 1944, Sun Li-jen was promoted its commander.

During the Chinese Civil War, the New 1st Army was deployed to Northeast China to fight against Chinese Communist Party military units under Lin Biao. It saw much success in the early battles. However, after some time, Sun was dismissed as commander after offending important members of the Kuomintang, including his superior, Chiang Kai-shek's favorite, Lieutenant-General Du Yuming. Sun Li-jen was replaced by Lieutenant-General Pan Yukun on 26 April 1947. Most officers above battalion level were also dismissed. This dealt a huge blow to the New 1st Army and it began to suffer heavy losses. The New 1st Army saw its last action in the effort to relieve the government-controlled city of Jinzhou in late October 1948 as part of General Liao Yao-hsiang's 9th Army Corps. The entire New 1st Army was wiped out during this campaign. General Pan Yukun barely escaped with his life. The commanders of the three divisions (New 30th, 50th and Provisional 53rd) were either captured or surrendered. Due to the New 1st Army’s uneasy history with both the Kuomintang and Chinese Communist Party, its successes are rarely talked about across both mainland China and Taiwan.

== See also ==
- Battle of Yenangyaung
- Republic of China Army
- New Fourth Army
- Battle of Toungoo
