= Burma campaign =

1941–1945 campaign during World War II

Coordinates: 21°N 96°E

- Part of the South-East Asian campaign of World War II
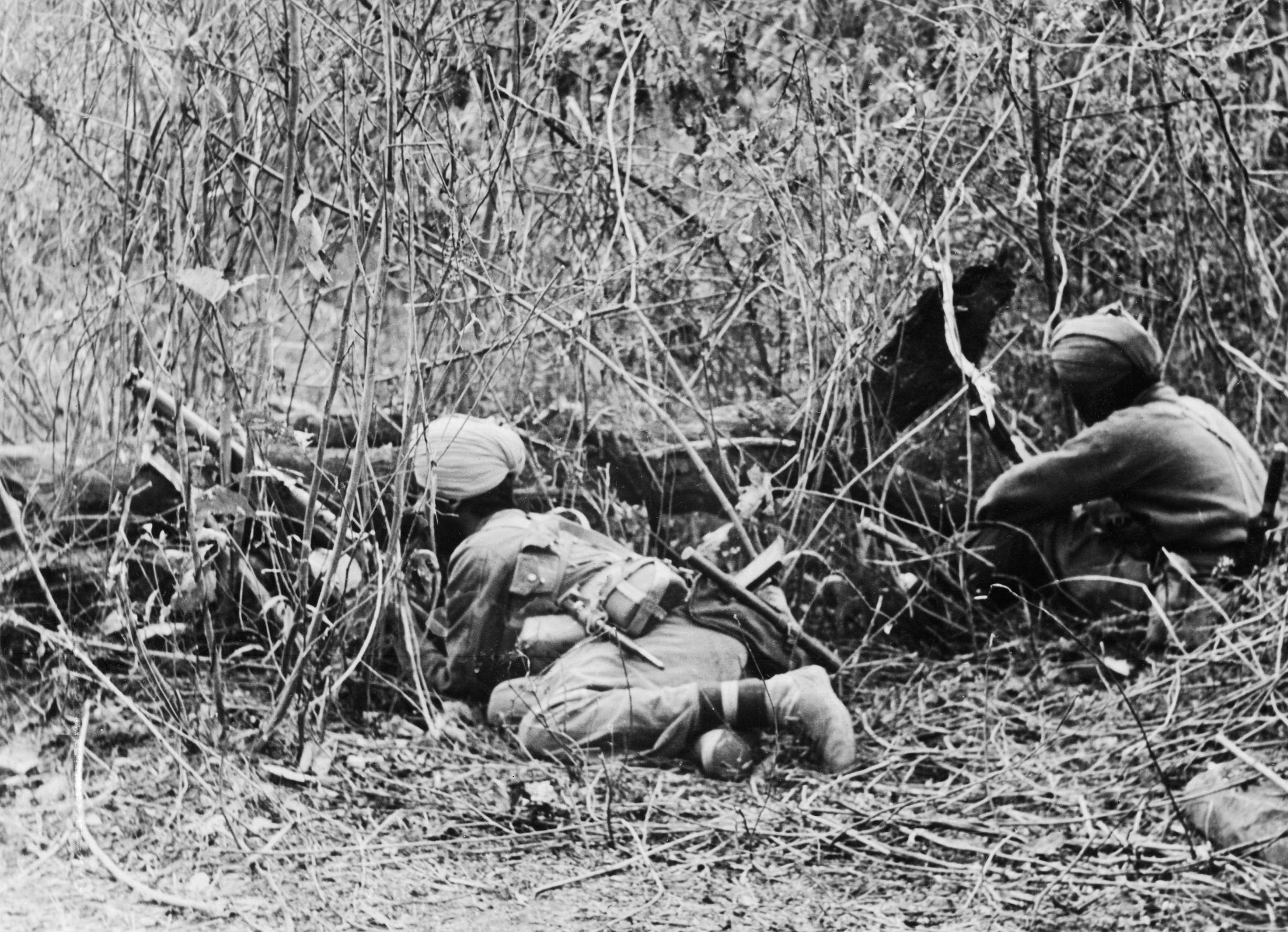
- Sikh soldiers of the 7th Indian Infantry Division at an observation post in the Ngakyedauk Pass, February 1944
Date	14 December 1941 – 13 September 1945 (3 years, 8 months, 4 weeks and 2 days)
Location	Burma and India
Result	Allied victory

Belligerents
Allies: United Kingdom: India; Burma; Somaliland; Gold Coast; Kenya; Nigeria; Northern Rhodesia; Southern Rhodesia; Nyasaland; Uganda; Canada; China; United States; Nepal; PBF (Note: The Burma National Army after it revolted against the Japanese and joined the allies as the Patriotic Burmese Forces.) (1945); Medical support: Belgian Congo	Axis: Japan: State of Burma; Azad Hind; Thailand

Commanders and leaders
Archibald Wavell; Louis Mountbatten; George Giffard; William Slim; Du Yuming; Luo Zhuoying; Wei Lihuang; Joseph Stilwell; Aung San (1945)	Shōjirō Iida; Masakazu Kawabe; Heitarō Kimura; Renya Mutaguchi; Subhas Chandra Bose; Ba Maw; Aung San (1941–1945); C. R. Seriroengrit; Phin Choonhavan

Strength
1942–1943 (Republic of China (1912–1949)) 95,000 (Note: Chinese Expeditionary Force in Burma.)–103,000 (United Kingdom) (British Raj) 42,000–47,000; 1944–1945 (United Kingdom) (British Raj) 1,000,000 (Note: They were drawn primarily from British India. Most of them stayed and defended in India, and did not participate in the counter-offensives in Burma.) (Republic of China (1912–1949)) 250,000 (Note: The X Force (About 75,000 troops) and Y Force (175,000 troops)) (United States) 12,000 (Note: 3,000 were frontline combat troops (Merrill's Marauders); the rest were engineering and air force personnel.); 15,000	1942–1943 (Empire of Japan) ~300,000 (Thailand) 35,000 (Myanmar) 23,000 (1942); 1944–1945 (Empire of Japan) 316,700 (1944) (India) 43,000 (1945)

Casualties and losses
Total Allied Casualties: 212,016–233,016 (Republic of China (1912–1949)) 122,163–143,163 casualties: 40,000 – 61,000 losses during the 1942 Japanese conquest of Burma (Note: Most died during the retreat.) (Note: An alternative estimate is 56,480 losses); 82,163 casualties from 1943 to 1945 (Note: Total Chinese losses were 35,812 killed or missing, with 46,351 wounded. X Force lost 4,218 killed, 10,403 wounded, and 151 missing. Y Force lost 31,443 killed and 35,948 wounded); (United Kingdom) ~86,600 casualties: 28,878 killed and missing; 44,731 wounded; ~12,700 died of disease; (United States) 3,253 total casualties (Note: Merrill's Marauders losses accounted for 2,394 of this figure, including 424 combat casualties and 1,970 deaths or evacuations due to disease.)	Total Axis Casualties: 210,000–228,000+ (Empire of Japan) 200,000–220,000 casualties: 144,000 – 164,500 total dead including disease; 115,000+ killed in action (Note: Japanese forces lost 2,431 dead from all causes in the 1941-1942 Campaign, roughly 15,000 KIA in the Imphal-Kohima Campaign, 18,000 KIA against Chinese forces in North Burma, and 80,000 KIA in General Slim's 1945 Campaign); 56,000 wounded; ~150 in combat • 5,149 died from diseases 2,615 dead or missing
- 250,000 to 1,000,000 Burmese civilians killed (Note: Total excludes the approximately 3 million civilians who died in the Bengal famine.)

The Burma campaign was a series of battles fought in the British colony of Burma as part of the South-East Asian theatre of World War II. It primarily involved forces of the Allies (mainly from the British Empire and the Republic of China, with support from the United States) against the invading forces of the Empire of Japan. Imperial Japan was supported by the Thai Phayap Army, as well as two collaborationist independence movements and armies, The State of Burma and the Provisional Government of Free India. Nominally independent puppet states were established in the conquered areas and some territories were annexed by Thailand. In 1942 and 1943, the international Allied force in British India launched several failed offensives to retake lost territories. Fighting intensified in 1944, and British Empire forces peaked at around 1 million land and air forces. These forces were drawn primarily from British India, with British Army forces (equivalent to eight regular infantry divisions and six tank regiments), 100,000 East and West African colonial troops, and smaller numbers of land and air forces from several other Dominions and Colonies. These additional forces allowed the Allied recapture of Burma in 1945.

The campaign had a number of notable features. The geographical characteristics of the region meant that weather, disease and terrain had a major effect on operations. The lack of transport infrastructure placed an emphasis on military engineering and air transport to move and supply troops, and evacuate wounded. The campaign was also politically complex, with the British, the United States and the Chinese all having different strategic priorities. It was also the only land campaign by the Western Allies in the Pacific Theatre that proceeded continuously from the start of hostilities to the end of the war. This was due to its geographical location. By extending from South East Asia to India, its area included some lands which the British lost at the outset of the war, but also included areas of India wherein the Japanese advance was eventually stopped. The climate of the region is dominated by the seasonal monsoon rains, which allowed effective campaigning for only just over half of each year. This, together with other factors such as famine and disorder in British India and the priority given by the Allies to the defeat of Nazi Germany, prolonged the campaign and divided it into four phases: the Japanese invasion, which led to the expulsion of British, Indian and Chinese forces in 1942; failed attempts by the Allies to mount offensives into Burma, from late 1942 to early 1944; the 1944 Japanese invasion of India, which ultimately failed following the battles of Imphal and Kohima; and finally the successful Allied offensive which liberated Burma from late 1944 to mid-1945.

The campaign was also strongly affected from the political atmosphere which erupted in the South-East Asian regions occupied by Japan, who pursued the Pan-Asianist policy of a "Greater East Asia Co-Prosperity Sphere". These led to a Japanese-sponsored revolution during the initial invasion and the establishment of the State of Burma, whose Burma Independence Army had spearheaded the initial attacks against the country. The Provisional Government of Free India, with its Indian National Army, fought under Imperial Japan, especially during Operation U-Go in 1944. The INA had earlier collaborated with Nazi Germany. The dominating attitude of the Japanese militarist who commanded the army stationed in the country ultimately doomed the co-prosperity sphere as a whole, leading to local hopes for real independence fading and a revolt by the Burma National Army in 1945. On the Allied side, political relations were mixed for much of the war. The China Burma India Theater American-trained Chinese X Force led to cooperation between the two countries, but the clashing strategies proposed by General Joseph Stilwell and Chinese Generalissimo Chiang Kai-shek would lead to Stilwell's eventual removal from his position as American Commander of the theater. On the other hand, China–India relations were positive from the cooperative Burma Road, built to reach the Chinese Y Force and the Chinese war effort inside China, as well as from the missions over the extremely dangerous air route over the Himalayas, nicknamed "The Hump". The campaign would have a great impact on the independence struggle of Burma and India in the post-war years.

== Japanese conquest of Burma ==
Japanese objectives in Burma were initially limited to the capture of Rangoon, the capital and principal seaport. This would close the overland supply line to China and provide a strategic bulwark to defend Japanese gains in British Malaya and the Dutch East Indies. The Japanese Fifteenth Army under Lieutenant General Shōjirō Iida, initially consisting of only two infantry divisions, moved into northern Thailand (which had signed a treaty of friendship with Japan), and launched an attack over jungle-clad mountain ranges into the southern Burmese province of Tenasserim (now Tanintharyi Region) in January 1942.

In the face of the Japanese advances, huge numbers of Indians, Anglo-Indians, and Anglo-Burmese fled Burma, around 600,000 by the autumn of 1942. Perhaps 80,000 of those in flight would die from starvation, exhaustion and disease. Some of the worst massacres in Burma during World War II would be perpetrated not by the Japanese but by Burmese gangs linked to the Burma Independence Army.

The Japanese successfully attacked over the Kawkareik Pass and captured the port of Moulmein at the mouth of the Salween River after overcoming stiff resistance. They then advanced northwards, outflanking successive British defensive positions. Troops of the 17th Indian Infantry Division tried to retreat over the Sittaung River, but Japanese parties reached the vital bridge before they did. On 22 February, the bridge was demolished to prevent its capture, a decision that has since been extremely contentious.

The loss of two brigades of the 17th Indian Division meant that Rangoon could not be defended. General Archibald Wavell, the commander-in-chief of the American-British-Dutch-Australian Command, nevertheless ordered Rangoon to be held as he was expecting substantial reinforcements from the Middle East. Although some units arrived, counterattacks failed and the new commander of the Burma Army (General Harold Alexander) ordered the city to be evacuated on 7 March after its port and oil refinery had been destroyed. The remnants of the Burma Army broke out to the north, narrowly escaping encirclement.

On the eastern part of the front, in the Battle of Yunnan-Burma Road, the Chinese 200th Division held up the Japanese for a time around Toungoo, but after its fall the road was open for motorised troops of the Japanese 56th Division to shatter the Chinese Sixth Army to the east in the Karenni States and advance northward through the Shan States to capture Lashio, outflanking the Allied defensive lines and cutting off the Chinese armies from Yunnan. With the effective collapse of the entire defensive line, there was little choice left other than an overland retreat to India or to Yunnan.

=== Japanese advance to the Indian frontier ===
After the fall of Rangoon in March 1942, the Allies attempted to make a stand in the north of the country (Upper Burma), having been reinforced by a Chinese Expeditionary Force. The Japanese had also been reinforced by two divisions made available by the capture of Singapore and defeated both the newly organised Burma Corps and the Chinese force. The Allies were also faced with growing numbers of Burmese insurgents, and the civil administration broke down in the areas they still held. With their forces cut off from almost all sources of supply, the Allied commanders finally decided to evacuate their forces from Burma. On 16 April, in Burma, 7,000 British soldiers were encircled by the Japanese 33rd Division during the Battle of Yenangyaung and rescued by the Chinese 38th Division.

The retreat was conducted in very difficult circumstances. Starving refugees, disorganised stragglers, and the sick and wounded clogged the primitive roads and tracks leading to India. Burma Corps managed to make it most of the way to Imphal, in Manipur in India, just before the monsoon broke in May 1942, having lost most of their equipment and transport. There, they found themselves living out in the open under torrential rains in extremely unhealthy circumstances. The army and civil authorities in India were very slow to respond to the needs of the troops and civilian refugees.

Due to a lack of communication, when the British retreated from Burma, almost none of the Chinese knew about the retreat. Realising that they could not win without British support, some of the X Force committed by Chiang Kai-shek made a hasty and disorganised retreat to India, where they were put under the command of the American General Joseph Stilwell. After recuperating, they were re-equipped and retrained by American instructors. The rest of the Chinese troops tried to return to Yunnan through remote mountainous forests, and of these, at least half died.

=== Thai army enters Burma ===
In accordance with the Thai military alliance with Japan that was signed on 21 December 1941, on 21 March, the Thais and Japanese also agreed that the Karenni State and Shan States were to be under Thai control. The rest of Burma was to be under Japanese control.

The leading elements of the Thai Phayap Army under General J. R. Seriroengrit crossed the border into the Shan States on 10 May 1942. Three Thai infantry divisions and one cavalry division, spearheaded by armoured reconnaissance groups and supported by the Royal Thai Air Force, engaged the retreating Chinese 93rd Division. Kengtung, the main objective, was captured on 27 May. On 12 July, General Phin Choonhavan, who would become the Thai military governor of the occupied Shan State later in the war, ordered the 3rd Division of the Phayap Army from the southern part of the Shan State to occupy Karenni State and expel the Chinese 55th Division from Loikaw. The Chinese troops could not retreat because the routes to Yunnan were controlled by Axis forces, and many Chinese soldiers were captured. The Thais remained in control of the Shan States for the remainder of the war. Their troops suffered from supply shortages and disease, but were not subjected to Allied attacks.

== Allied setbacks, 1942–1943 ==
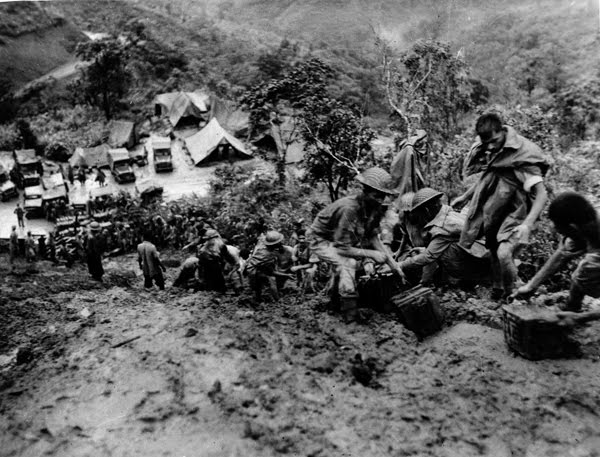
Indian troops move ammunition in very muddy conditions whilst on the road to Tamu, 1943.

The Japanese did not renew their offensive after the monsoon ended. They installed a nominally independent Burmese government under Ba Maw, and reformed the Burma Independence Army on a more regular basis as the Burma National Army under General Aung San. In practice, both government and army were strictly controlled by the Japanese authorities.

On the Allied side, operations in Burma over the remainder of 1942 and in 1943 were a study of military frustration. Britain could only maintain three active campaigns, and immediate offensives in both the Middle East and Far East proved impossible through lack of resources. The Middle East was accorded priority, being closer to home and in accordance with the "Germany First" policy in London and Washington.

The Allied buildup was also hampered by the disordered state of Eastern India at the time. There were violent Quit India protests in Bengal and Bihar, which required large numbers of British troops to suppress. There was also a disastrous famine in Bengal, which may have led to 3 million deaths through starvation, disease and exposure. In such conditions of chaos, it was difficult to improve the inadequate lines of communication to the front line in Assam or make use of local industries for the war effort. Efforts to improve the training of Allied troops took time, and in forward areas, poor morale and endemic disease combined to reduce the strength and effectiveness of the fighting units.

Nevertheless, the Allies mounted two operations during the 1942–1943 dry season. The first was a small offensive into the coastal Arakan Province of Burma. The Indian Eastern Army intended to reoccupy the Mayu peninsula and Akyab Island, which had an important airfield. A division advanced to Donbaik, only a few miles from the end of the peninsula, but was halted by a small but well-entrenched Japanese force. At this stage of the war, the Allies lacked the means and tactical ability to overcome strongly constructed Japanese bunkers. Repeated British and Indian attacks failed with heavy casualties. Japanese reinforcements arrived from Central Burma and crossed rivers and mountain ranges, which the Allies had declared to be impassable, to hit the Allies' exposed left flank and overrun several units. The exhausted British were unable to hold any defensive lines and were forced to abandon much equipment and fall back almost to the Indian frontier.

The second action was controversial. Under the command of Brigadier Orde Wingate, a long-range penetration unit known as the Chindits infiltrated through the Japanese front lines and marched deep into Burma, with the initial aim of cutting the main north–south railway in Burma in an operation codenamed Operation Longcloth. Some 3,000 men entered Burma in many columns. They damaged the communications of the Japanese in northern Burma, cutting the railway for possibly two weeks, but they suffered heavy casualties. Though the results were questioned, the operation was used to propaganda effect, particularly to insist that British and Indian soldiers could live, move and fight as effectively as the Japanese in the jungle, doing much to restore morale among Allied troops.

== The balance shifts 1943–1944 ==
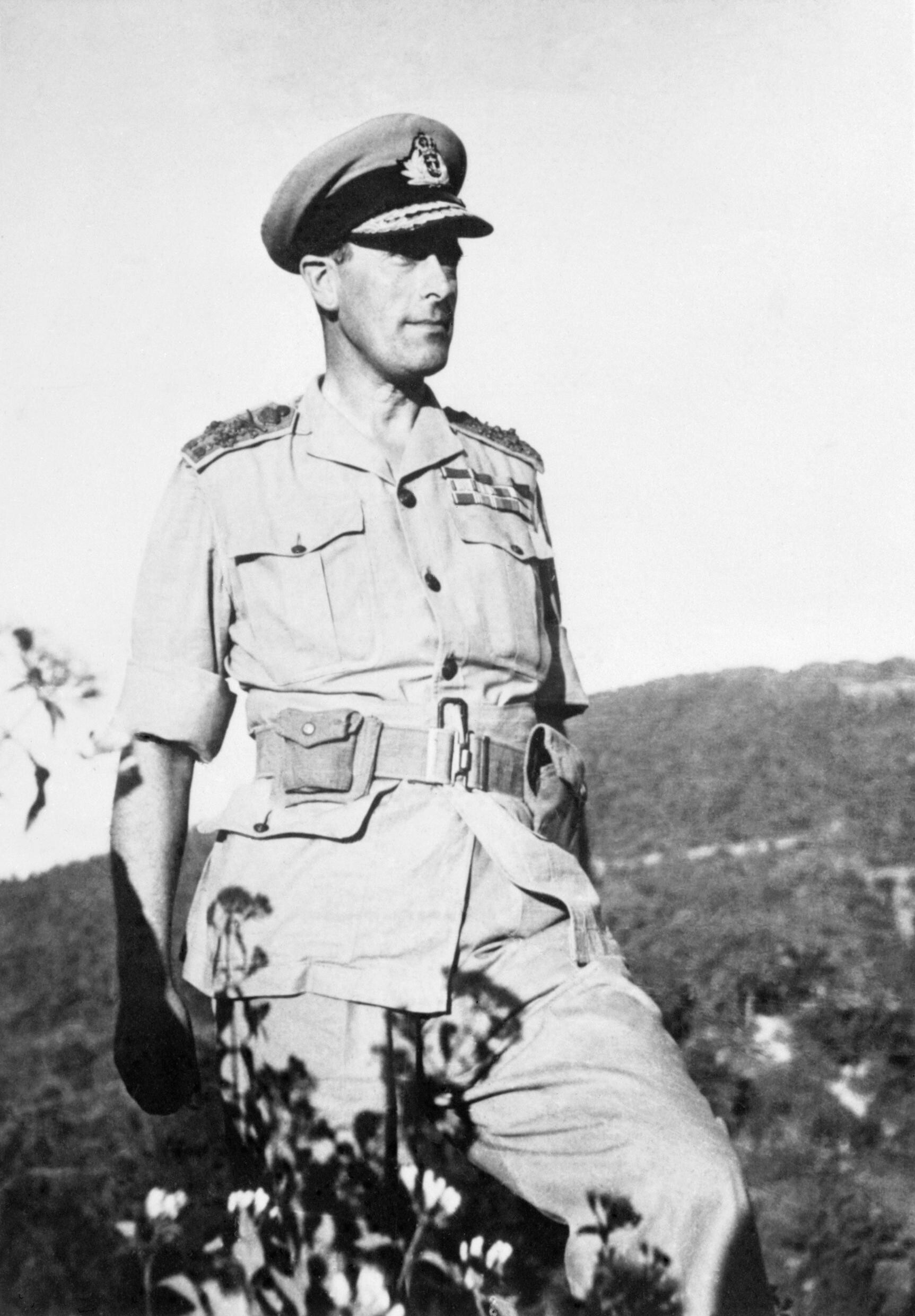
Lord Louis Mountbatten, Supreme Allied Commander, seen during his tour of the Arakan Front in February 1944

From December 1943 to November 1944, the strategic balance of the Burma campaign shifted decisively. Improvements in Allied leadership, training and logistics, together with greater firepower and growing Allied air superiority, gave Allied forces the confidence they had previously lacked. In the Arakan, XV Indian Corps withstood, and then broke, a Japanese counterstrike, while the Japanese invasion of India resulted in unbearably heavy losses and the ejection of the Japanese back beyond the Chindwin River.

=== Allied plans ===
In August 1943, the Allies created South East Asia Command (SEAC), a new combined command responsible for the South-East Asian Theatre, under Admiral Lord Louis Mountbatten. The training, equipment, health and morale of Allied troops under British Fourteenth Army under Lieutenant General William Slim was improving, as was the capacity of the lines of communication in North-eastern India. An innovation was the extensive use of aircraft to transport and supply troops.

SEAC had to accommodate several rival plans, many of which had to be dropped for lack of resources. Amphibious landings on the Andaman Islands (Operation "Pigstick") and in Arakan were abandoned when the landing craft assigned were recalled to Europe in preparation for the Normandy Landings.

The major effort was intended to be by American-trained Chinese troops of Northern Combat Area Command (NCAC) under Stilwell, to cover the construction of the Ledo Road. Orde Wingate had controversially gained approval for a greatly expanded Chindit force, which was given the task of assisting Stilwell by disrupting the Japanese lines of supply to the northern front. Chiang Kai-shek had also agreed reluctantly to mount an offensive from Yunnan.

Under the British Fourteenth Army, the Indian XV Corps prepared to renew the advance in Arakan province, while IV Corps launched a tentative advance from Imphal in the centre of the long front to distract Japanese attention from the other offensives.

=== Japanese plans ===
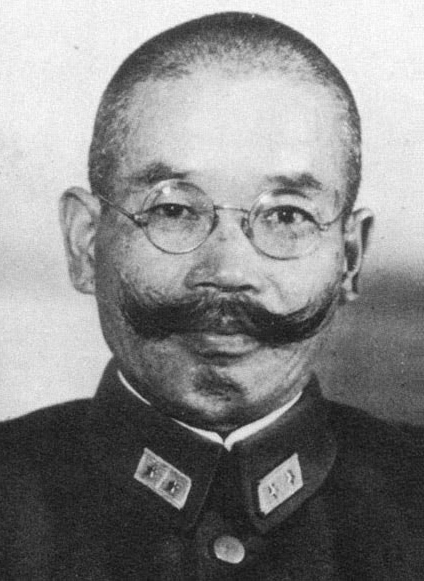
Lieutenant General Kawabe, commander of the Japanese Burma Area Army

About the same time that SEAC was established, the Japanese created the Burma Area Army under Lieutenant General Masakazu Kawabe, which took under command the Fifteenth Army and the newly formed Twenty-Eighth Army.

The new commander of Fifteenth Army, Lieutenant General Renya Mutaguchi, was keen to mount an offensive against India. Burma Area Army originally quashed this idea, but found that their superiors at Southern Expeditionary Army Group HQ in Singapore were keen on it. When the staff at Southern Expeditionary Army were persuaded that the plan was inherently risky, they in turn found that Imperial General Headquarters in Tokyo was in favour of Mutaguchi's plan.

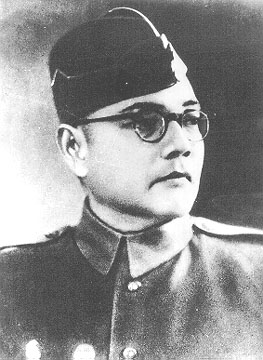
Netaji Subhas Chandra Bose, the Commander-of-Chief of the Indian National Army

The Japanese were influenced to an unknown degree by Subhas Chandra Bose, commander of the Indian National Army. This was composed largely of Indian soldiers who had been captured in Malaya or Singapore, and Indians (Tamils) living in Malaya. At Bose's instigation, a substantial contingent of the INA joined in this Dilli Chalo ("March on Delhi") with the war cry Jai Hind. Both Bose and Mutaguchi emphasised the advantages which would be gained by a successful attack into India, with the ultimate plan being that once Japanese forces had broken through British defences at Imphal, the INA would cross the hills of North-East India into the Gangetic plain, where it would work as a guerrilla army. This army was expected to live off the land, with captured British supplies, support, and personnel from the local population. With misgivings on the part of several of Mutaguchi's superiors and subordinates, Operation U-Go was launched.

=== Northern and Yunnan front 1943–1944 ===
Stilwell's forces (designated X Force) initially consisted of two American-equipped Chinese divisions with a Chinese-manned M3 Light Tank battalion and an American long-range penetration brigade known as "Merrill's Marauders".

In 1943, the Thai Phayap Army invaded Xishuangbanna in China, but was driven back by the Chinese nationalist force.

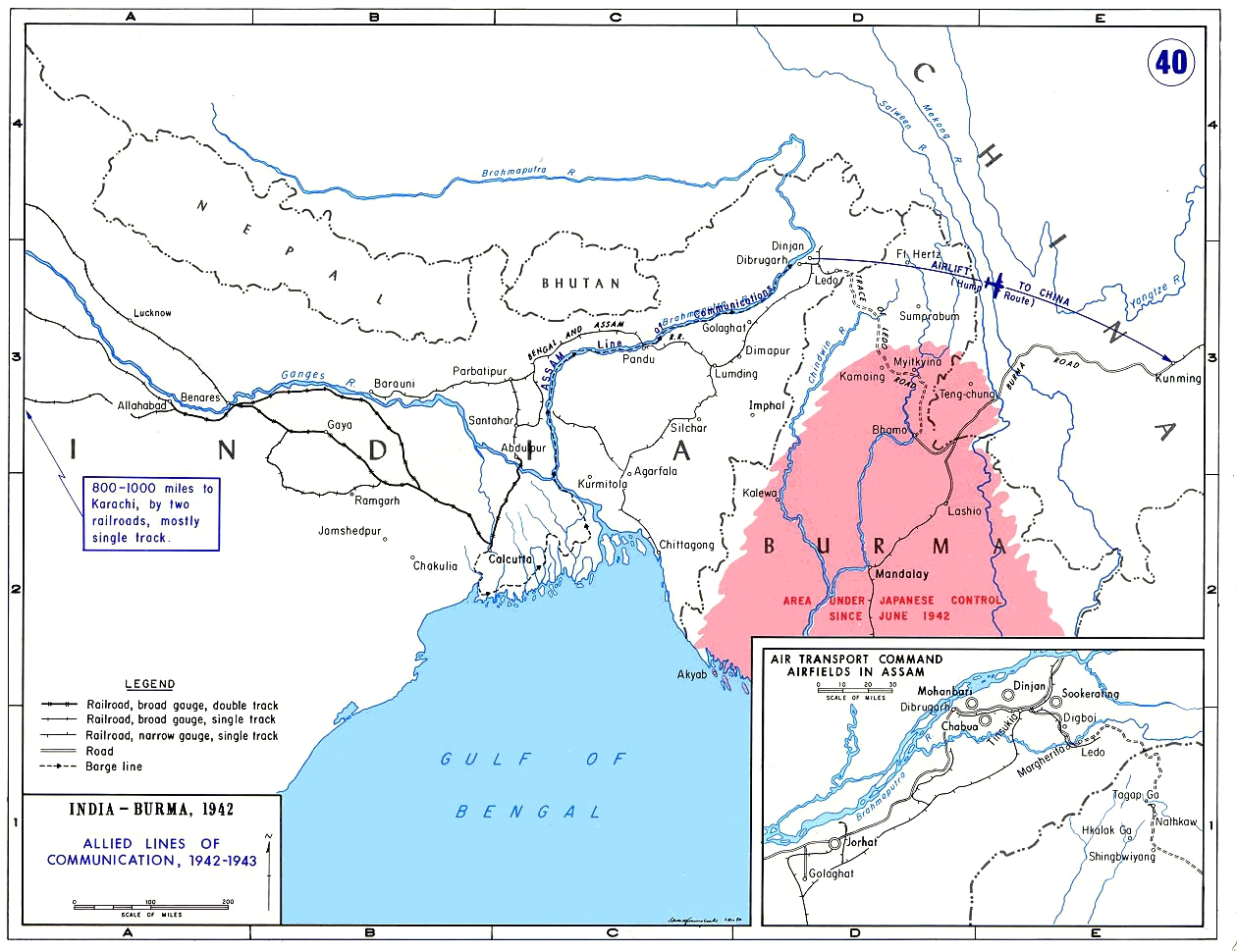
The India–China airlift delivered approximately 650,000 tons of material to China at a cost of 1,659 men and 594 aircraft.

In October 1943, the Chinese 38th Division, led by Sun Li-jen, began to advance from Ledo, Assam towards Myitkyina and Mogaung while American engineers and Indian labourers extended the Ledo Road behind them. The Japanese 18th Division was repeatedly outflanked by the Marauders and threatened with encirclement.

In Operation Thursday, the Chindits were to support Stilwell by interdicting Japanese communications in the region of Indaw. A brigade began marching across the Patkai mountains on 5 February 1944. In early March,, three other brigades were flown into landing zones behind Japanese lines by the Royal Air Force and the USAAF and established defensive strongholds around Indaw.

Meanwhile, the Chinese forces on the Yunnan front (Y Force) mounted an attack starting in the second half of April, with nearly 75,000 troops crossing the Salween river on a 300-kilometre (190 mi) front. Soon, some twelve Chinese divisions of 175,000 men, under General Wei Lihuang, were attacking the Japanese 56th Division. The Japanese forces in the North were now fighting on two fronts in northern Burma.

On 17 May, control of the Chindits passed from Slim to Stilwell. The Chindits now moved from the Japanese rear areas to new bases closer to Stilwell's front, and were given additional tasks by Stilwell for which they were not equipped. They achieved several objectives, but at the cost of heavy casualties. By the end of June, they had linked up with Stilwell's forces but were exhausted and were withdrawn to India.

Also on 17 May, a force of two Chinese regiments, Unit Galahad (Merrill's Marauders) and Kachin guerrillas captured the airfield at Myitkyina. The Allies did not immediately follow up on this success and the Japanese were able to reinforce the town, which fell only after a siege that lasted until 3 August. The capture of Myitkyina airfield nevertheless immediately helped secure the air link from India to Chongqing over the Hump.

By the end of May, the Yunnan offensive, though hampered by the monsoon rains and lack of air support, succeeded in annihilating the garrison of Tengchong and eventually reached as far as Longling. Strong Japanese reinforcements then counterattacked and halted the Chinese advance.

=== Southern front 1943–1944 ===
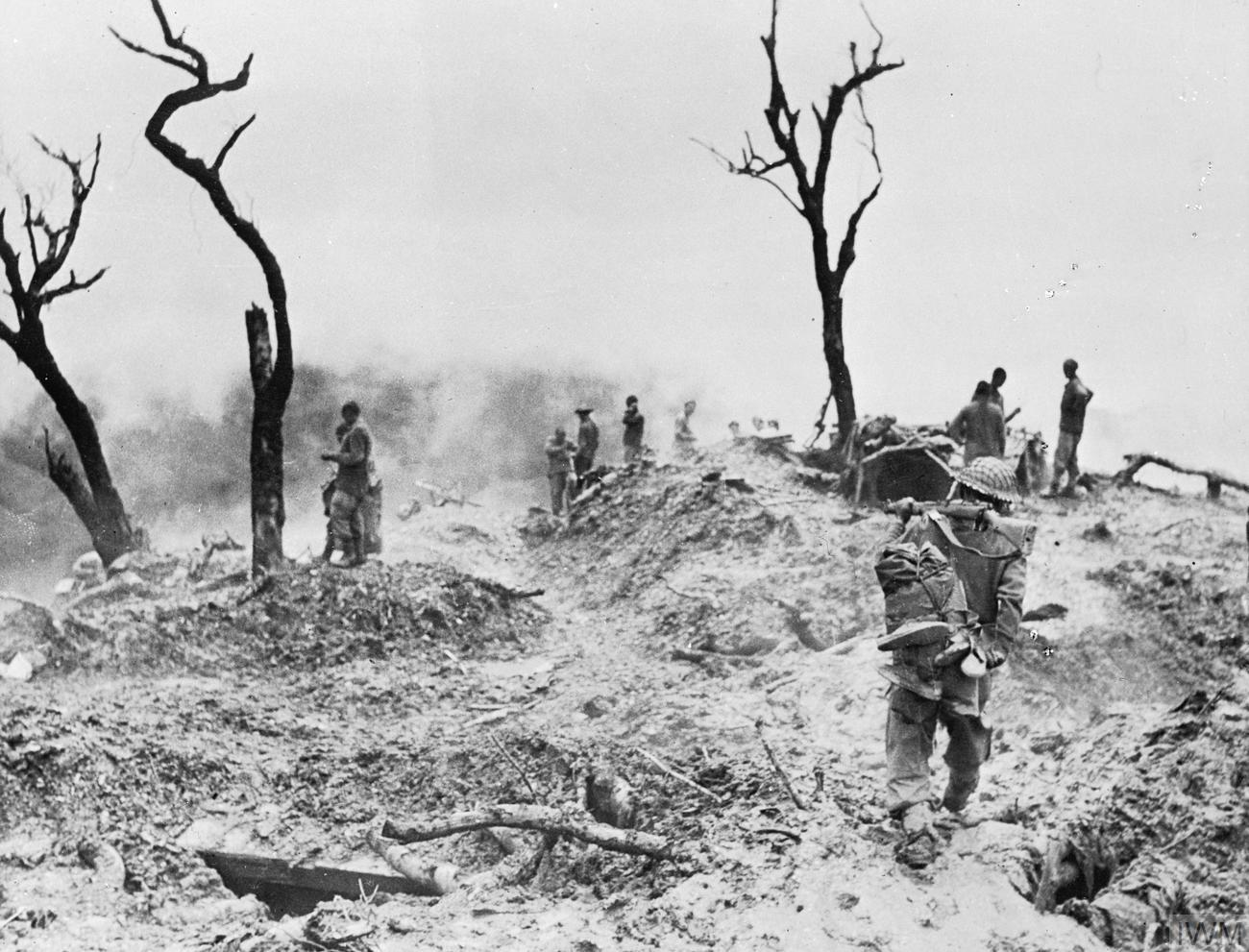
The scene on Scraggy Hill, captured by the 10th Gurkhas during the Battle of Imphal

In Arakan, Indian XV Corps under Lieutenant General Philip Christison renewed the advance on the Mayu peninsula. Ranges of steep hills channelled the advance into three attacks each by an Indian or West African division. The 5th Indian Infantry Division captured the small port of Maungdaw on 9 January 1944. The Corps then prepared to capture two railway tunnels linking Maungdaw with the Kalapanzin valley, but the Japanese struck first. A strong force from the Japanese 55th Division infiltrated Allied lines to attack the 7th Indian Infantry Division from the rear, overrunning the divisional HQ.

Unlike previous occasions on which this had happened, the Allied forces stood firm against the attack and supplies were dropped to them by parachute. In the Battle of the Admin Box from 5 to 23 February, the Japanese concentrated on XV Corps' Administrative Area, defended mainly by line of communication troops but they were unable to deal with tanks supporting the defenders, while troops from 5th Indian Division broke through the Ngakyedauk Pass to relieve the defenders of the box. Although battle casualties were approximately equal, the result was a heavy Japanese defeat. Their infiltration and encirclement tactics had failed to panic Allied troops, and as the Japanese were unable to capture enemy supplies, they starved.

Over the next few weeks, XV Corps' offensive ended as the Allies concentrated on the Central Front. After capturing the railway tunnels, XV Corps halted during the monsoon.

== Japanese invasion of India 1944 ==
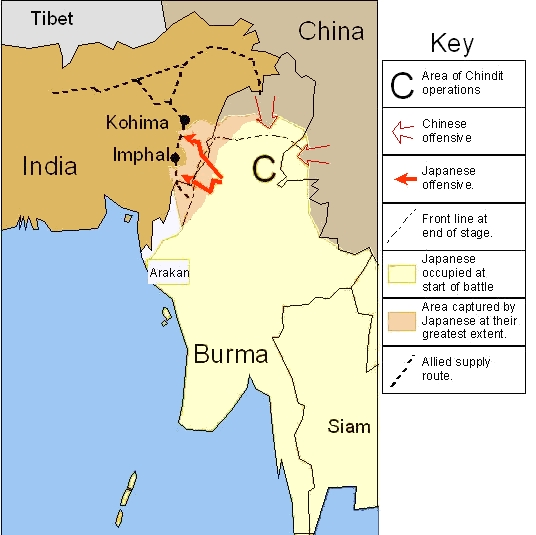
Imphal and Kohima Campaign

IV Corps, under Lieutenant-General Geoffry Scoones, had pushed forward two divisions to the Chindwin River. One division was in reserve at Imphal in Manipur. There were indications that a major Japanese offensive was building. Slim and Scoones planned to withdraw and force the Japanese to fight with their logistics stretched beyond the limit. However, they misjudged the date on which the Japanese were to attack and the strength they would use against some objectives.

The Japanese Fifteenth Army consisted of three infantry divisions and a brigade-sized detachment ("Yamamoto Force"), and the 1st division of the Indian National Army. Mutaguchi planned to cut off and destroy the forward divisions of IV Corps before capturing Imphal, while the Japanese 31st Division alongside the INA 2nd Division isolated Imphal by capturing Kohima. Mutaguchi intended to exploit the capture of Imphal by capturing the strategic city of Dimapur, in the Brahmaputra River valley. If this could be achieved, the lines of communication to General Stilwell's forces and the airbases used to supply the Chinese over the Hump would be cut.

The Japanese troops crossed the Chindwin River on 8 March with the bulk of the INA First Division under Shah Nawaz Khan defending their flanks from Chin and Kashin guerillas. Scoones (and Slim) were slow to order their forward troops to withdraw and the 17th Indian Infantry Division was cut off at Tiddim. It fought its way back to Imphal with aid from Scoones's reserve division, supplied by parachute drops. North of Imphal, 50th Indian Parachute Brigade was defeated at Sangshak by a regiment from the Japanese 31st Division on its way to Kohima. Imphal was thus left vulnerable to an attack by the Japanese 15th Division from the north, but because the diversionary attack launched by the Japanese in Arakan had already been defeated, Slim was able to move the 5th Indian Division by air to the Central Front. Two brigades went to Imphal, the other went to Dimapur, from where it sent a detachment to Kohima.

By the end of the first week in April, IV Corps had concentrated in the Imphal plain. The Japanese launched several offensives during the month. Despite their efforts, they could not hold onto any gains made for long and suffered heavy casualties. The INA during this time served to back up the 15th Division, however aside from an INA contingent under Col. Shaukat Malik taking the Border enclave of Moirang on the 14th, their independent activities were largely limited due to their Japanese patrons' supply lines being stretched thin. At the start of May, Slim and Scoones began a counter-offensive against the Japanese 15th Division and the INA 1st Division north of Imphal. Progress was slow, as movement was made difficult by monsoon rains, and IV Corps was short of supplies.

Also at the beginning of April, the Japanese 31st Division under Lieutenant-General Kotoku Sato, alongside the INA 2nd Division under M.Z. Kiani, to their right flank, reached Kohima. Instead of isolating the small British garrison there and pressing on with his main force to Dimapur, Sato and Kiani chose to capture the hill station. The siege lasted from 5 to 18 April, when the exhausted defenders were relieved. A new formation HQ, the Indian XXXIII Corps under Lieutenant-General Montagu Stopford, now took over operations on this front. The 2nd British Infantry Division began a counter-offensive and by 15 May, they had prised the Japanese & INA off Kohima Ridge itself. After a pause during which more Allied reinforcements arrived, XXXIII Corps renewed its offensive.

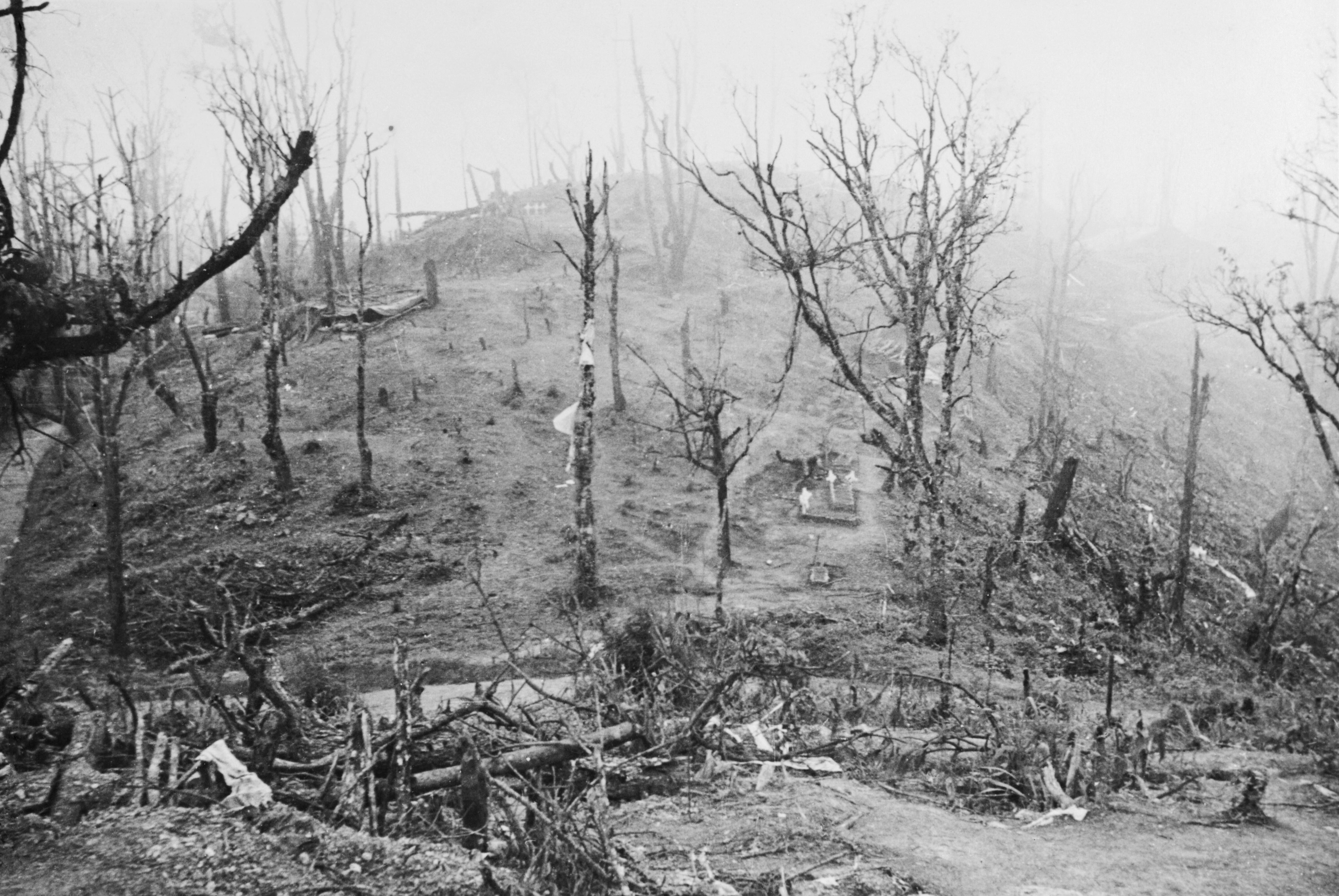
View of the Garrison Hill battlefield, the key to the British defences at Kohima

By now, the Japanese and INA were at the end of their endurance. Their troops (particularly Japanese 15th and 31st and INA 1st and 2nd Divisions) were starving with nothing much in the way of supplies, and during the monsoon, disease spread rapidly among them. Lieutenant-General Sato had notified Mutaguchi that his and Kiani's divisions would withdraw from Kohima at the end of May if they were not supplied. In spite of orders to hold on and Khan's 1st Division belatedly reinforcing them, Sato did indeed retreat. The leading troops of IV Corps and XXXIII Corps met at Milestone 109 on the Dimapur-Imphal road on 22 June, and the siege of Imphal was raised.

Mutaguchi (and Kawabe) continued to order renewed attacks. The 33rd Division, 1st Division (now redirected back to Imphal) and Yamamoto Force made repeated efforts, but by the end of June, they had suffered so many casualties both from battle and disease that they were unable to make any progress. The Imphal operation was finally broken off early in July, and the Japanese retreated painfully to the Chindwin River. A weakened Gandhi regiment of the INA stalled the Maratha Light Infantry in time for their comrades to cross the river. With the rest of the INA 1st Division, including the 1st and 2nd Guerrilla regiments, protecting the Yamamoto Force's flanks at the most crucial time of the retreat.

It was the greatest defeat to date in Japanese history. They had suffered 50–60,000 dead, and 100,000 or more casualties. Most of these losses were the result of disease, malnutrition and exhaustion. The Allies suffered 12,500 casualties, including 2,269 killed. Mutaguchi had already relieved all his divisions' commanders, and was himself subsequently relieved of command. The INA too was battered, with entire units either deserting or disbanding and a substantial amount of materiel being lost, initial hopes of advancing into the Brahmaputra valley were squashed and the force was mainly reduced to serving as Auxiliaries for the Japanese. It would never fully recover from the loss for the duration of the war.

During the monsoon from August to November, Fourteenth Army pursued the Japanese to the Chindwin River. While the 11th East Africa Division advanced down the Kabaw Valley from Tamu, the 5th Indian Division advanced along the mountainous Tiddim road. By the end of November, Kalewa had been recaptured, and several bridgeheads were established on the east bank of the Chindwin.

== Allied capture of Burma 1944–1945 ==
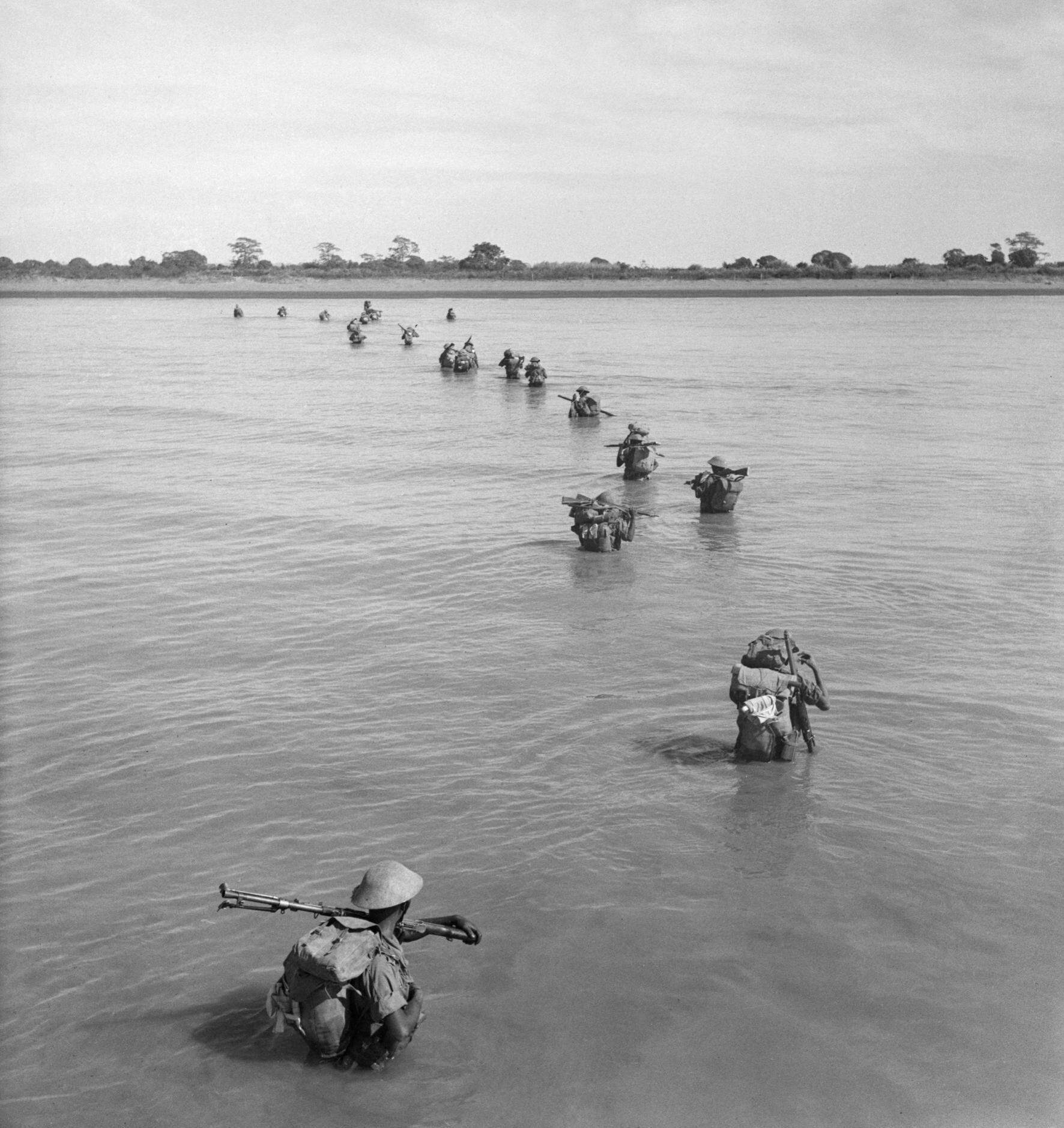
Indian troops wade ashore at Akyab, January 1945.

The Allies launched a series of offensive operations into Burma during late 1944 and the first half of 1945. The command on the front was rearranged in November 1944. Eleventh Army Group HQ was replaced by Allied Land Forces South East Asia and NCAC and XV Corps were placed directly under this new headquarters. Although the Allies were still attempting to complete the Ledo Road, it was apparent that it would not materially affect the course of the war in China.

The Japanese also made major changes in their command. The most important was the replacement of General Kawabe at Burma Area Army by Hyotaro Kimura. Kimura threw Allied plans into confusion by refusing to fight at the Chindwin River. Recognising that most of his formations were weak and short of equipment, he withdrew his forces behind the Irrawaddy River, forcing the Allies to greatly extend their lines of communication.

=== Southern front 1944–1945 ===
In Arakan, XV Corps resumed its advance on Akyab Island for the third year in succession. This time, the Japanese were far weaker and retreated before the steady Allied advance. They evacuated Akyab Island on 31 December 1944. It was occupied by XV Corps without resistance on 3 January 1945 as part of Operation Talon, the amphibious landing at Akyab.

Landing craft had now reached the theatre, and XV Corps launched amphibious attacks on the Myebon peninsula on 12 January 1945 and at Kangaw ten days later during the Battle of Hill 170 to cut off the retreating Japanese. There was severe fighting until the end of the month, in which the Japanese suffered heavy casualties.

An important objective for XV Corps was the capture of Ramree Island and Cheduba Island to construct airfields which would support the Allies' operations in Central Burma. Most of the Japanese garrison died during the Battle of Ramree Island. XV Corps operations on the mainland were curtailed to release transport aircraft to support Fourteenth Army.

=== Northern front 1944–1945 ===
NCAC resumed its advance late in 1944, although it was progressively weakened by the flyout of Chinese troops to the main front in China. On 10 December 1944, the 36th British Infantry Division on NCAC's right flank made contact with units of Fourteenth Army near Indaw in Northern Burma. Five days later, Chinese troops on the command's left flank captured the city of Bhamo.

NCAC made contact with Chiang's Yunnan armies on 21 January 1945, and the Ledo road could finally be completed, although by this point in the war, its value was uncertain. Chiang ordered the American General Daniel Isom Sultan, commanding NCAC, to halt his advance at Lashio, which was captured on 7 March. This was a blow to British plans as it endangered the prospects of reaching Yangon before the onset of the monsoon, expected at the beginning of May. Winston Churchill, British Prime Minister, appealed directly to American Chief of Staff George Marshall for the transport aircraft which had been assigned to NCAC to remain in Burma. From 1 April, NCAC's operations stopped, and its units returned to China and India. A US-led guerrilla force, OSS Detachment 101, took over the remaining military responsibilities of NCAC.

=== Central front 1944–1945 ===
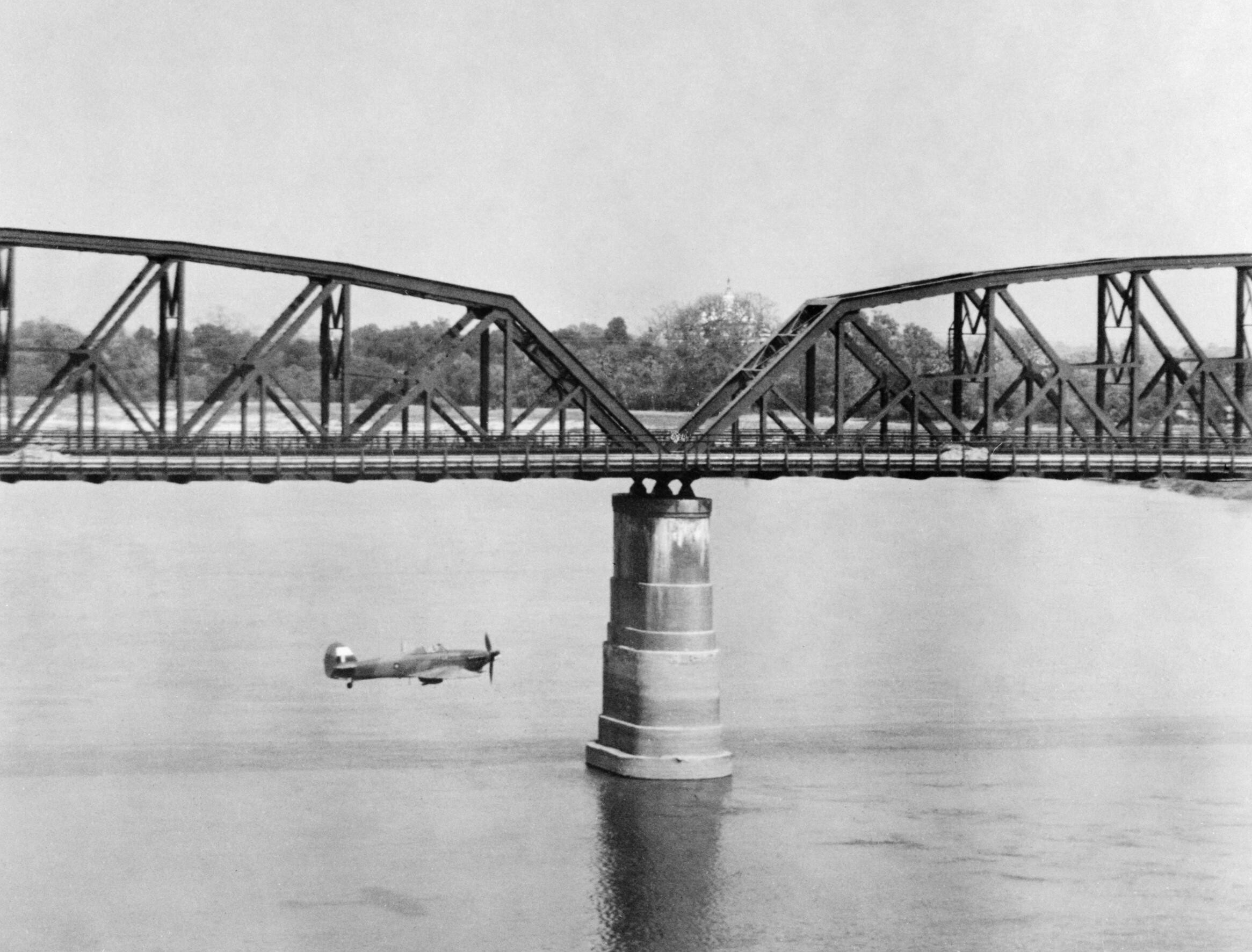
An RAF Hawker Hurricane Mk IIC flies alongside Ava Bridge, which spans the Irrawaddy River near Mandalay, Burma, during a low-level reconnaissance sortie, March 1945.

The Fourteenth Army, now consisting of IV Corps and XXXIII Corps, made the main offensive effort into Burma. Although the Japanese retreat over the Irrawaddy forced the Allies to completely change their plans, such was the Allies' material superiority that this was done. IV Corps was switched in secret from the right to the left flank of the army and aimed to cross the Irrawaddy near Pakokku and seize the Japanese line-of-communication centre of Meiktila, while XXXIII Corps continued to advance on Mandalay.

During January and February 1945, XXXIII Corps seized crossings over the Irrawaddy River near Mandalay, defended by the INA's 2nd Division. There was heavy fighting, initially The 7th Indian Infantry Division's two attempted crossings at Pagan and Nyangu were a disaster with INA machine gun fire tearing through their assault boats. however, aid from the tanks of the Gordon Highlanders and 11th Sikh Regiment would inflict heavy casualties on the INA defenders and force them to surrender and their remnants to fall back to Mount Popa, which diverted Japanese reserves and fixed their attention. The 17th Indian Division and 255th Indian Tank Brigade followed them across and struck for Meiktila. In the open terrain of Central Burma, this force outmanoeuvred the Japanese and fell on Meiktila on 1 March. The town was captured in four days, despite resistance to the last man.

The Japanese tried first to relieve the garrison at Meiktila and then to recapture the town and destroy its defenders. Their attacks were not properly coordinated and were repulsed, with the INA forces under Prem Sahgal tasked with defending Mount Popa after their retreat from Pagan and preventing the British 17th Division from exposing Kimura's flank being underequipped, at times fighting tanks with hand grenades and bottles of petrol. By the end of March the Japanese had suffered heavy casualties and lost most of their artillery, their chief anti-tank weapon. They broke off the attack and retreated to Pyawbwe.

By this point, any morale that remained in the INA after Operation U-Go's failure collapsed with many soldiers deserting or surrendering. Isolated, losing men to exhaustion and to desertion, low on ammunition and food, and pursued by Commonwealth forces, the surviving units of the second division began an attempt to withdraw towards Rangoon. They broke through encircling Commonwealth lines a number of times before finally surrendering at various places in early April 1945.

XXXIII Corps had renewed its attack on Mandalay. It fell to the 19th Indian Division on 20 March, though the Japanese held the former citadel, which the British called Fort Dufferin for another week. Much of the historically and culturally significant portions of Mandalay were burned to the ground.

=== Race for Rangoon ===
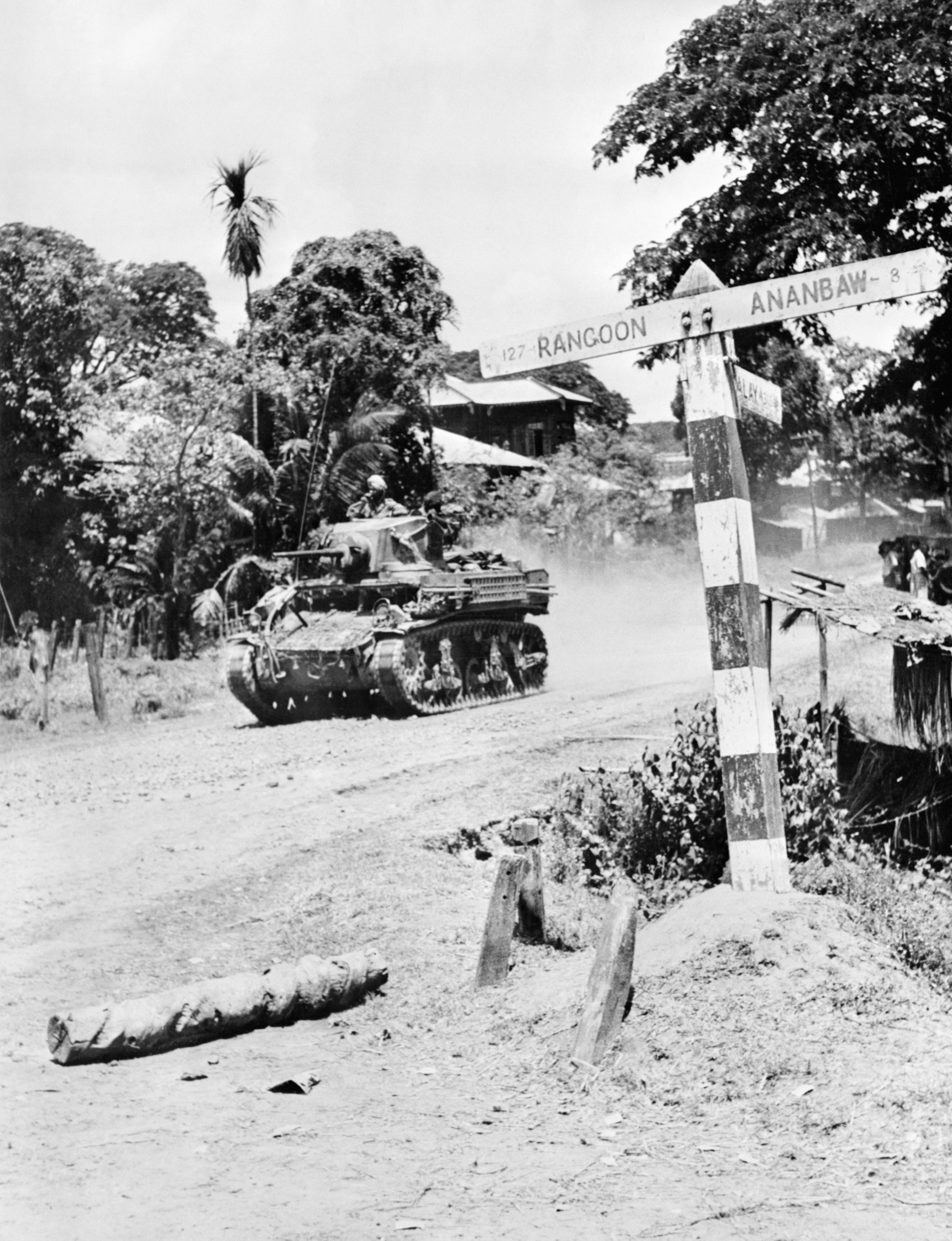
An M3 Stuart of an Indian cavalry regiment during the advance on Rangoon, April 1945

Though the Allied force had advanced successfully into central Burma, it was vital to capture the port of Rangoon before the monsoon to avoid a logistics crisis. In the spring of 1945, the other factor in the race for Rangoon was the years of preparation by the liaison organisation, Force 136, which resulted in a national uprising within Burma and the defection of the entire Burma National Army to the Allied side. In addition to the allied advance, the Japanese now faced open rebellion behind their lines.

XXXIII Corps mounted Fourteenth Army's secondary drive down the Irrawaddy River valley against stiff resistance from the Japanese Twenty-Eighth Army. IV Corps made the main attack down the "Railway Valley", which was also followed by the Sittaung River. They began by striking at a Japanese delaying position (held by the remnants of the Japanese Thirty-Third Army, INA 1st Division and Rani of Jhansi regiment) at Pyawbwe. The attackers were initially halted by a strong defensive position behind a dry waterway, but a flanking move by tanks and mechanised infantry struck the Japanese and INA from the rear and shattered them.

From this point, the advance down the main road to Rangoon faced little organised opposition. An uprising assisted by Force 136 in Operation Character by Karen guerillas prevented troops from the reorganised Japanese Fifteenth Army from reaching the major road centre of Taungoo before IV Corps captured it. The leading Allied troops met Japanese rearguards north of Bago, 40 miles (64 km) north of Rangoon, on 25 April. Heitarō Kimura had formed the various service troops, naval personnel and even Japanese civilians in Yangon into the 105 Independent Mixed Brigade. This scratch formation held up the British advance until 30 April and covered the evacuation of the Rangoon area.

=== Operation Dracula ===
The original conception of the plan to re-take Burma had envisaged XV Corps making an amphibious assault on Rangoon well before Fourteenth Army reached the capital, in order to ease supply problems. This operation, codenamed Operation Dracula, was postponed several times as the necessary landing craft were retained in Europe and finally dropped in favour of an attack on Phuket Island, off the west coast of Thailand.

Slim feared that the Japanese would defend Rangoon to the last man through the monsoon, which would put Fourteenth Army in a disastrous supply situation. He therefore asked for Operation Dracula to be re-mounted at short notice. The naval forces for the attack on Phuket were diverted to Operation Dracula, and units of XV Corps were embarked from Akyab and Ramree.

On 1 May, a Gurkha parachute battalion was dropped on Elephant Point and cleared Japanese rearguards from the mouth of the Yangon River. The 26th Indian Infantry Division landed by ship the next day. When they arrived, they discovered that Kimura had ordered Rangoon to be evacuated, starting on 22 April, leaving only a small 6,000-strong INA garrison under A.D. Loganathan who had managed to keep law and order in the city over the past two weeks and who promptly surrendered to Commonwealth forces without much resistance. On the afternoon of 2 May 1945, the monsoon rains began in full force. The Allied drive to liberate Rangoon before the rains had succeeded with only a few hours to spare.

The leading troops of the 17th and 26th Indian divisions met at Hlegu, 28 miles (45 km) north of Rangoon, on 6 May.

== Final operations ==
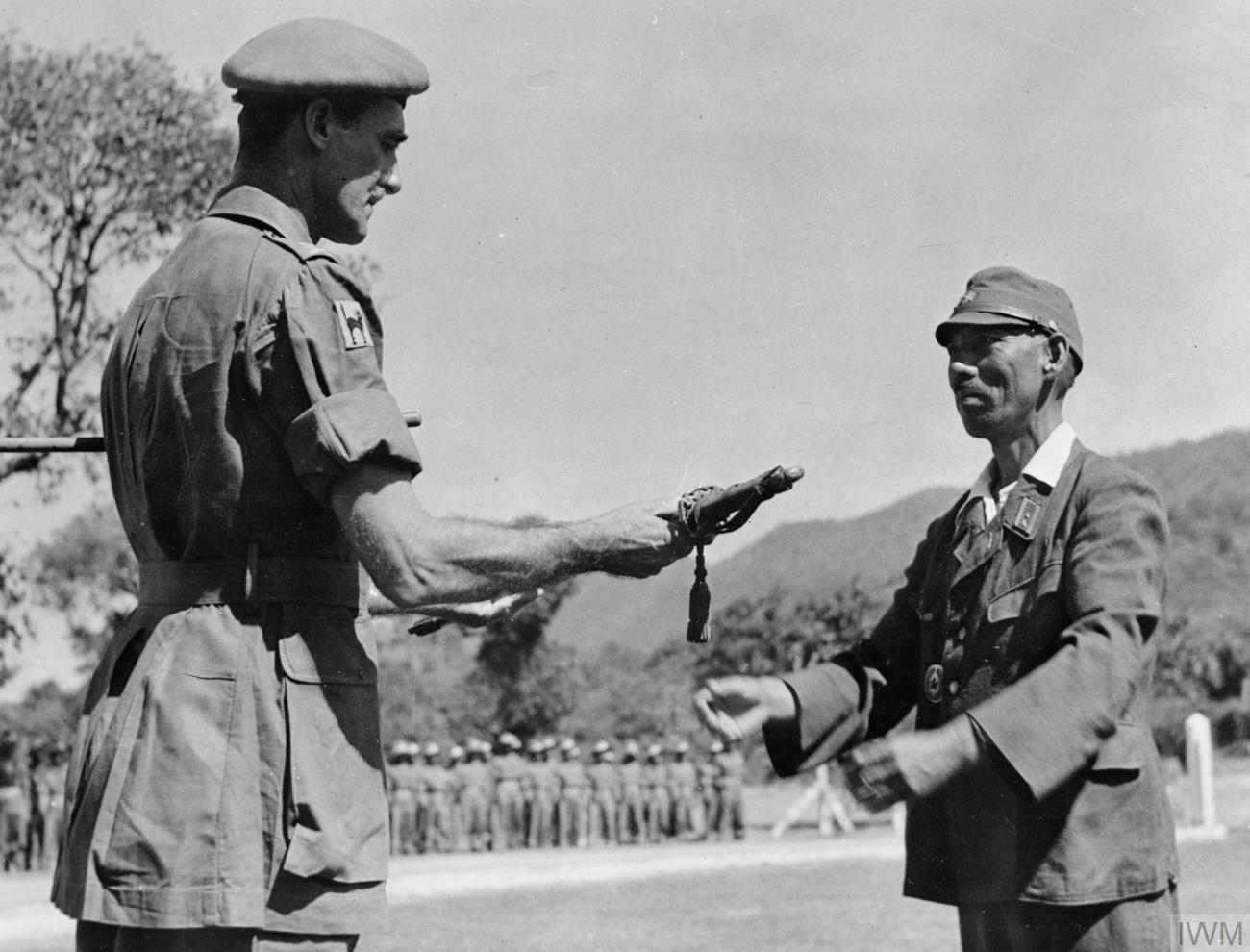
Lieutenant General Kawada, commander of the Japanese 31st Division, surrenders to Major General Arthur W Crowther, DSO, commander of the 17th Indian Division, near Moulmein, Burma.

After the Allies captured Rangoon, a new Twelfth Army headquarters was created from XXXIII Corps HQ to take control of the formations which were to remain in Burma.

The Japanese Twenty-Eighth Army, after withdrawing from Arakan and resisting XXXIII Corps in the Irrawaddy valley, retreated into the Pegu Yomas, a range of low jungle-covered hills between the Irrawaddy and Sittang rivers. They planned to break out and rejoin the Burma Area Army. To cover this breakout, Kimura ordered the Thirty-Third Army to mount a diversionary offensive across the Sittang, although the entire army could muster the strength of barely a regiment. On 3 July, they attacked British positions in the "Sittang Bend". On 10 July, after a battle for a country which was almost entirely flooded, both the Japanese and the Allies withdrew.

The Japanese had attacked too early. Sakurai's Twenty-Eighth Army was not ready to start the breakout until 17 July. The breakout was a disaster. The British had placed ambushes or artillery concentrations on the routes the Japanese were to use. Hundreds of men drowned trying to cross the swollen Sittang on improvised bamboo floats and rafts. Burmese guerrillas and bandits killed stragglers east of the river. The breakout cost the Japanese nearly 10,000 men, half the strength of the Twenty-Eighth Army. British and Indian casualties were minimal.

Fourteenth Army (now under Lieutenant General Miles Dempsey) and XV Corps had returned to India to plan the next stage of the campaign to retake Southeast Asia. A new corps, the Indian XXXIV Corps, under Lieutenant-General Ouvry Lindfield Roberts, was raised and assigned to Fourteenth Army for further operations.

This was to be an amphibious assault on the western side of Malaya, codenamed Operation Zipper. The surrender of Japan forestalled this operation, but it was undertaken post-war as the quickest way of getting occupation troops into Malaya.

== Results ==
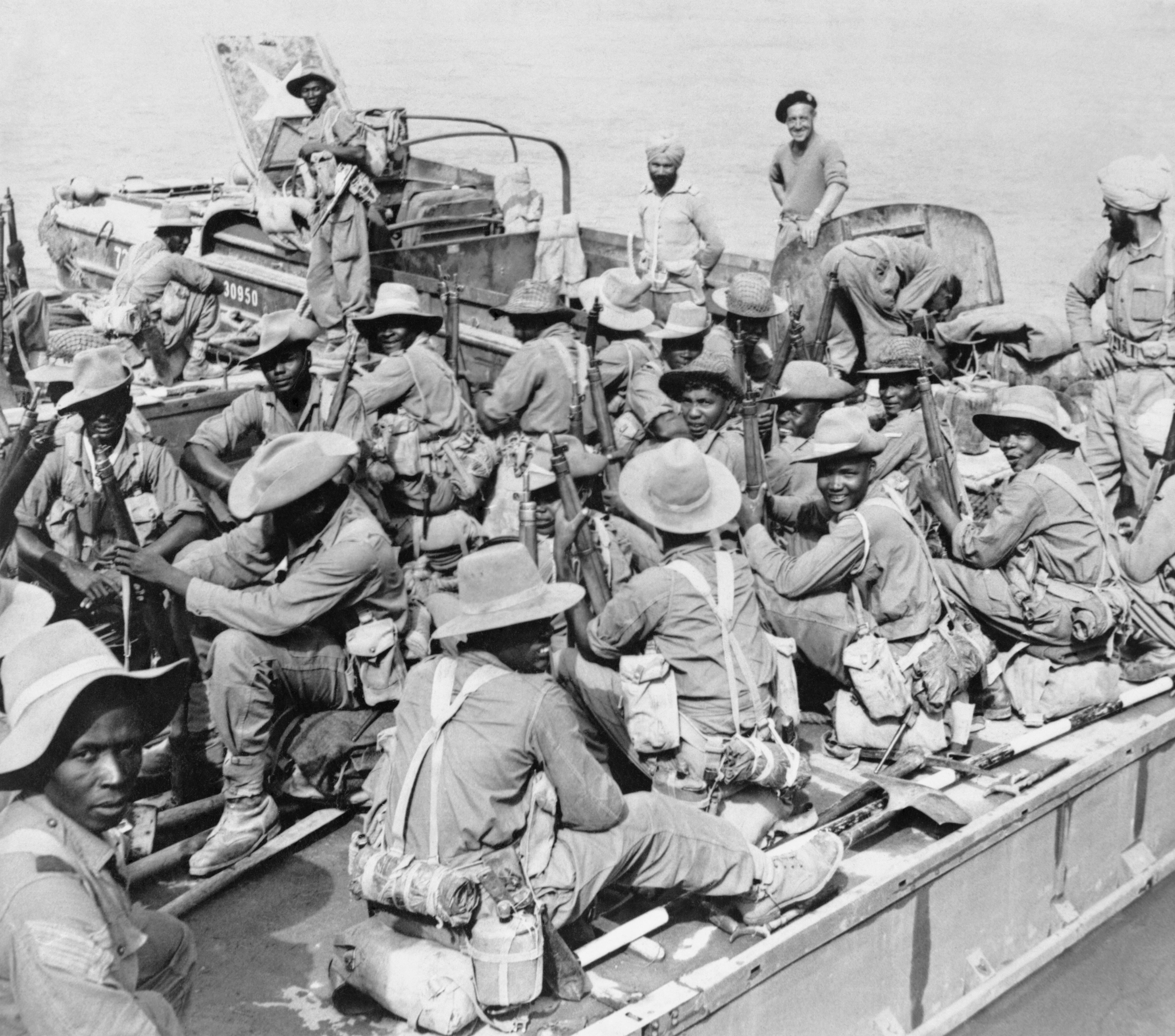
East African troops in Burma, 1944

Generally, the recovery of Burma is reckoned as a triumph for the British Indian Army and resulted in the greatest defeat the Japanese armies had suffered to that date.

The attempted Japanese invasion of India in 1944 was launched on unrealistic premises as after the Singapore debacle and the loss of Burma in 1942, the British were bound to defend India at all costs. A successful invasion by Japanese Imperial forces would have been disastrous. The defence operations at Kohima and Imphal in 1944 have since taken on huge symbolic value as the turning of the tide in British fortunes in the war in the East.

The campaign would also mark the final nail in the coffin for the INA after its short time in the limelight during Operation U-Go. The remaining INA remnants alongside Bose would begin an "epic retreat" to Bangkok, regularly suffering casualties due to strafing from Allied planes and sporadic attacks from Aung San's Burmese resistance.

The American historian Raymond Callahan concluded "Slim's great victory ... helped the British, unlike the French, Dutch or, later, the Americans, to leave Asia with some dignity".

After the war ended, a combination of the pre-war agitation among the Bamar population for independence and the economic ruin of Burma during the four-year campaign made it impossible for the former regime to be resumed. Within three years both Burma and India were independent.

American goals in Burma had been to aid the Nationalist Chinese regime. Apart from the "Hump" airlift, these bore no fruit until so near the end of the war that they made little contribution to the defeat of Japan. These efforts have also been criticised as fruitless because of the self-interest and corruption of Chiang Kai-Shek's regime.

== See also ==
- India in World War II
- Japanese occupation of Burma
- Second Sino-Japanese War
- Soviet invasion of Manchuria

== Bibliography ==
- Allen, Louis (2002). Burma: The Longest War. London: Phoenix Press. ISBN 1842122606.
- Bayly, Christopher; Harper, Tim (2005). Forgotten Armies: The Fall of British Asia, 1941–1945. London: Allen Lane. ISBN 978-0-713-99463-6.
- Carew, Tim (1969). The Longest Retreat: The Burma campaign 1942. London: Hamish Hamilton. OCLC 1440327531.
- Calvert, Mike (1996). Fighting Mad. Shrewsberry: Airlife. ISBN 185310762X.
- Churchill, Winston (1954). Triumph and Tragedy. The Second World War. Vol. 6. London: Cassel. OCLC 312199790.
- Dillon, Terence (1978). Rangoon to Kohima. London: Regimental Headquarters. OCLC 418644711.
- Drea, Edward J. (1998). "An Allied Interpretation of the Pacific War". In the Service of the Emperor: Essays on the Imperial Japanese Army. Nebraska: University of Nebraska Press. ISBN 0-8032-1708-0.
- Farquharson, Robert (2006). For Your Tomorrow: Canadians and the Burma Campaign, 1941–1945. Trafford Publishing. p. 360. ISBN 978-1-41201-536-3.
- Fay, Peter W. (1993), The Forgotten Army: India's Armed Struggle for Independence, 1942–1945, University of Michigan Press, ISBN 0-472-08342-2
- Fraser, George MacDonald (2007). Quartered Safe Out Here: A Harrowing Tale of World War II. Skyhorse Publishing. p. 358. ISBN 978-1-60239-190-1.
- Grant, Ian Lyall; Tamayama, Kazuo (1999). Burma 1942 : the Japanese invasion : both sides tell the story of a savage jungle war. Chichester: Zampi Press. ISBN 0952108313.
- Hastings, Max (2007). Nemesis. Harper Press. ISBN 978-0-00-721982-7.
- Hata, Ikuhiko; et al. (Pearl Harbor reexamined : prologue to the Pacific war) (1990). Hilary Conroy, Harry Wray (ed.). Road to the Pacific War. Honolulu: University of Hawaii Press. ISBN 0824812352.
- Hickey, Michael (2003). The unforgettable army : Slim's XIVth army in Burma. Staplehurst: Spellmount. ISBN 1862270503.
- Hideo, Fujino (1994). 大東亜戦・シンガポールビルマサバイバル記 (in Japanese). Tokyo: 近代文芸社. ISBN 4-7733-2628-X.
- Hodsun, James Landsdale (1942). War in the Sun. London: V. Gollancz Ltd.
- Iida, Shojiro From the Battlefields
- Jackson, Ashley (2006). The British Empire and the Second World War. London: Hambledon Continuum. pp. 387–388. ISBN 978-1-85285-517-8.
- Duncan Anderson (1991). Keegan, John (ed.). Churchill's Generals. London: Cassell Military. pp. 243–255. ISBN 0-304-36712-5.
- Latimer, Jon (2017). Burma: The Forgotten War. London: Thistle Publishing. OCLC 1416538812.
- Lunt, James (1986). A Hell of a Licking' – The Retreat from Burma 1941–2. London: Collings. ISBN 0-00-272707-2.
- McLynn, Frank (2011). The Burma Campaign: Disaster Into Triumph, 1942–45. New Haven: Yale University Press. ISBN 978-0300187441.
- Moser, Don (1978). World War II: China-Burma-India. Time-Life. ISBN 0809424843. LCCN 78003819.
- Slim, William Slim 1st Viscount (1972). Defeat into victory (Unabridged ed.). London: Cassell. ISBN 0-304-29114-5.
- Ochi, Harumi. Struggle in Burma.
- Reynolds, Bruce (1994). Thailand and Japan's Southern Advance. Basingstoke: Macmillan. ISBN 0333614968.
- Rolo, Charles J. (1945). Wingate's raiders : an account of the incredible adventure that raised the curtain on the battle for Burma. London: George G. Harrap & Co. OCLC 951405985.
- Shigematsu, Sadayoshi. Fighting Around Burma.
- Shores, Christopher (2005). Bloody Shambles. Air War for Burma: The Allied Air Forces Fight Back in South-East Asia 1942–1945. Vol. 3. Grub Street. ISBN 1-904010-95-4.
- Singh, Harkirat (2003), INA Trials and the Raj, Atlantic Publishers, ISBN 81-269-0316-3
- Smyth, John (1957). Before the dawn; a story of two historic retreats. London: Cassell. OCLC 2749300.
- Sugita, Saiichi. Burma Operations
- Thompson, Robert (1989). Make for the Hills. London: L. Cooper. ISBN 0850527619.
- Thompson, Julian (2009). Forgotten Voices of Burma: The Second World War's Forgotten Conflict. London: Ebury. ISBN 978-0091932367.
- Toye, Hugh (1959), The Springing Tiger: A Study of the Indian National Army and of Netaji, Allied Publishers, ISBN 978-81-8424-392-5
- Webster, Donovan (2004). The Burma Road : The Epic Story of the China-Burma-India Theater in World War II. London: Macmillan. ISBN 1405041463.
- Williams, James Howard was Elephant Advisor to the Fourteenth Army, see his Elephant Bill (1950) and Bandoola (1953)
- Young, Edward M. (1995). Aerial Nationalism: A History of Aviation in Thailand. Washington D.C.: Smithsonian Inst. Press. ISBN 1560984058.
