= Battle of Pinwe =

1944 WWII conflict in Burma

- Part of the Burma campaign of World War II
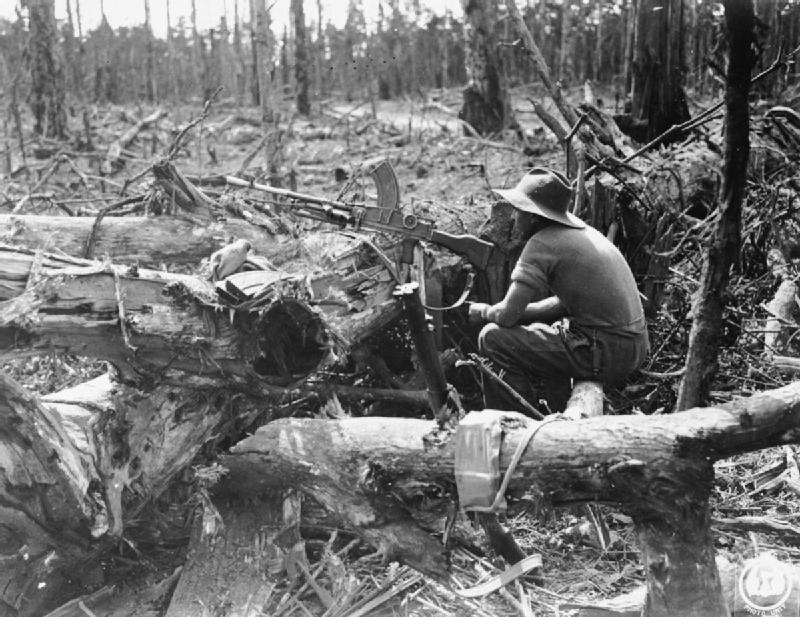
- A Bren gunner of 36th Infantry Division guards a jungle path in an area recently cleared by artillery near Pinwe, November 1944.
Date	November 15–30, 1944 (2 weeks and 1 day)
Location	Pinwe in Burma 24°20′26″N 96°11′36″E
Result	British victory

Belligerents
United Kingdom	(Empire of Japan) Japan

Commanders and leaders
(United Kingdom) Francis Festing	(Empire of Japan) Hisashi Takeda

Units involved
(United Kingdom) 36th Division	(Empire of Japan) 53rd Division (elements)

Strength
6,500	4,000

Casualties and losses
400	~600

The Battle of Pinwe was an engagement which took place during the Burma Campaign of World War II between 15 and 30 November 1944 at the Burmese town of Pinwe. The battle was fought between British and Japanese forces with the latter defending a vital railway corridor as part of the allied advance of Operation Capital. The assault was led by the British 36th Infantry Division, under the command of Major-General Francis Festing. After brutal fighting that lasted for nearly two weeks the town was finally taken after the Japanese had retreated.

== Background ==
Commencing in June 1944 in Northern Burma the Northern Combat Area Command (NCAC) led by American General "Vinegar Joe" Stilwell's were pushing into Northern Burma. The British Chindits had taken Mogaung the same month and the joint Chinese and US forces had taken Myitkyina two months later. With the capture of these two vitals towns, the Allies formulated a plan, known as Operation Capital, to retake Northern Burma and reopen a land route to China. Stillwell was reinforced by the arrival of elements of Francis Festing's 36th Division at Myitkyina airfield. Stillwell sent that division to advance on the 'Railway Corridor' from Mogaung towards Indaw on the right flank of NCAC.

Their advance soon came across thick jungle, interlaced with fast running streams, and valleys with enclosed paddy fields, elephant grass and waterlogged scrub. The division fought a series of actions assisted by Chinese artillery - Nansankyin, Pinbaw and the railway town of Mawlu were taken by the end of October. In November they advanced to Pinwe which lay seventeen miles by road north-west of Katha.

Festing had asked General Daniel Sultan who had recently replaced Stilwell for Chinese cooperation with the 50th Chinese Division. This however proved fruitless as the Chinese were making a drive further North and were unable to commit to any support. Pinwe was to be assaulted by two brigades of the 36th Division. Whilst 29th brigade would launch the main attack, the 72nd Brigade was held in reserve.

== Battle ==
Pinwe was held by the Japanese 119th and 151st infantry regiments which was the bulk of the main Japanese defence force the 53rd Division covering Indaw and Katha. Around the town, the Japanese had established defensive positions, these included deep bunkers and a series of trenches. There were also a number of tanks to bulk up the defence.

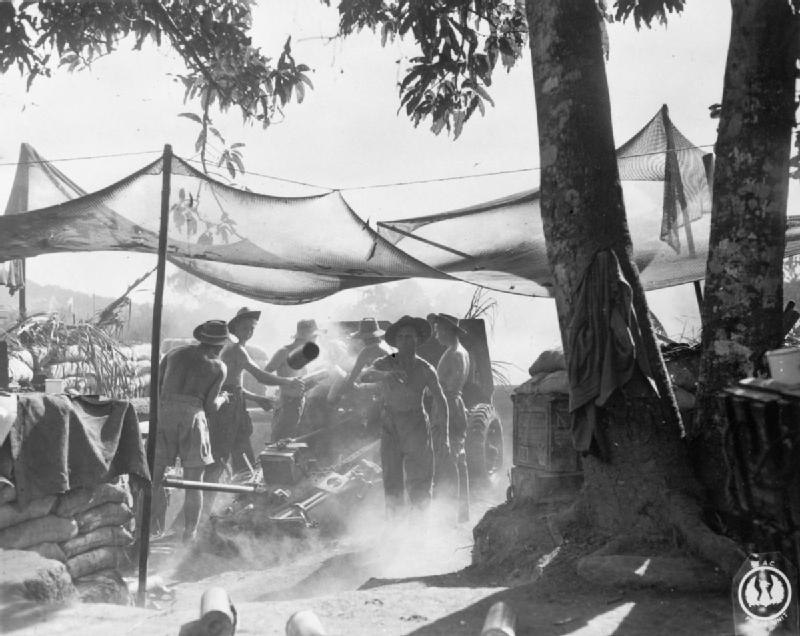
36th Infantry Division 25 Pounder guns in action against Japanese positions in the Pinwe area, 30 November 1944

Launching the attack on 15 November the divisional artillery opened up hoping to soften up the Japanese defences. As the British established positions around Pinwe the Japanese made a series of suicide charges. The British were quick to react and broke up the charges one by one inflicting heavy losses. The following day the Japanese had withdrawn to their defences positions leaving two officers and 54 other ranks dead plus many more that lay in the thick jungle. There were nearly as many wounded. One prisoner was taken along with swords, rifles and a number of heavy machine guns.

The advance on Pinwe was brought to standstill as heavy Japanese resistance forced the men to ground. Active patrolling then took place with the assistance of heavy bombardments from the divisional artillery as they pounded the Japanese defences. Japanese infiltration tactics at night sought out to destroy the British artillery. The Japanese nearly succeeded in cutting off two companies of Gloucestershire infantry, nevertheless they repulsed the Japanese attacks and held their positions before relief came. Attritional fighting took place as one position after another fell over the next few days. The Gloucesters A' Company cleared a Japanese bunker but took heavy casualties, losing all of its officers. 'B' Company also faced fierce counter-attacks, with many soldiers killed by snipers. Japanese resistance thus remained firm. The South Wales Borderers made attempts to force their way over the stream which covered the principle Japanese defensive positions, but suffered heavy casualties in the process. Even when a company did manage to cross like they did on 25 November, they were unable to reinforce or supply them so a withdrawal had to be made. On 27 November, the battered 29th brigade came out of reserve and were relieved by the 72nd.

Over the next two days the 36th Division artillery and RAF and USAAF air strikes pummelled the Japanese around Pinwe. This soon took its toll on the defenders and the Japanese defences began to crumble. All of the supporting handful of tanks were knocked out and Japanese losses became severe. The 29th Brigade began to push forward clearing the Japanese out of their defences. During the night the 53rd division had received orders to withdraw so that it might take part in the anticipated decisive action on the plains of central Burma. The Japanese retreated from the town during the night and then crossed the east Bank of the nearby Irrawaddy River.

The following morning the British entered the battered town unopposed. Many dead Japanese lay where they were.

== Aftermath ==
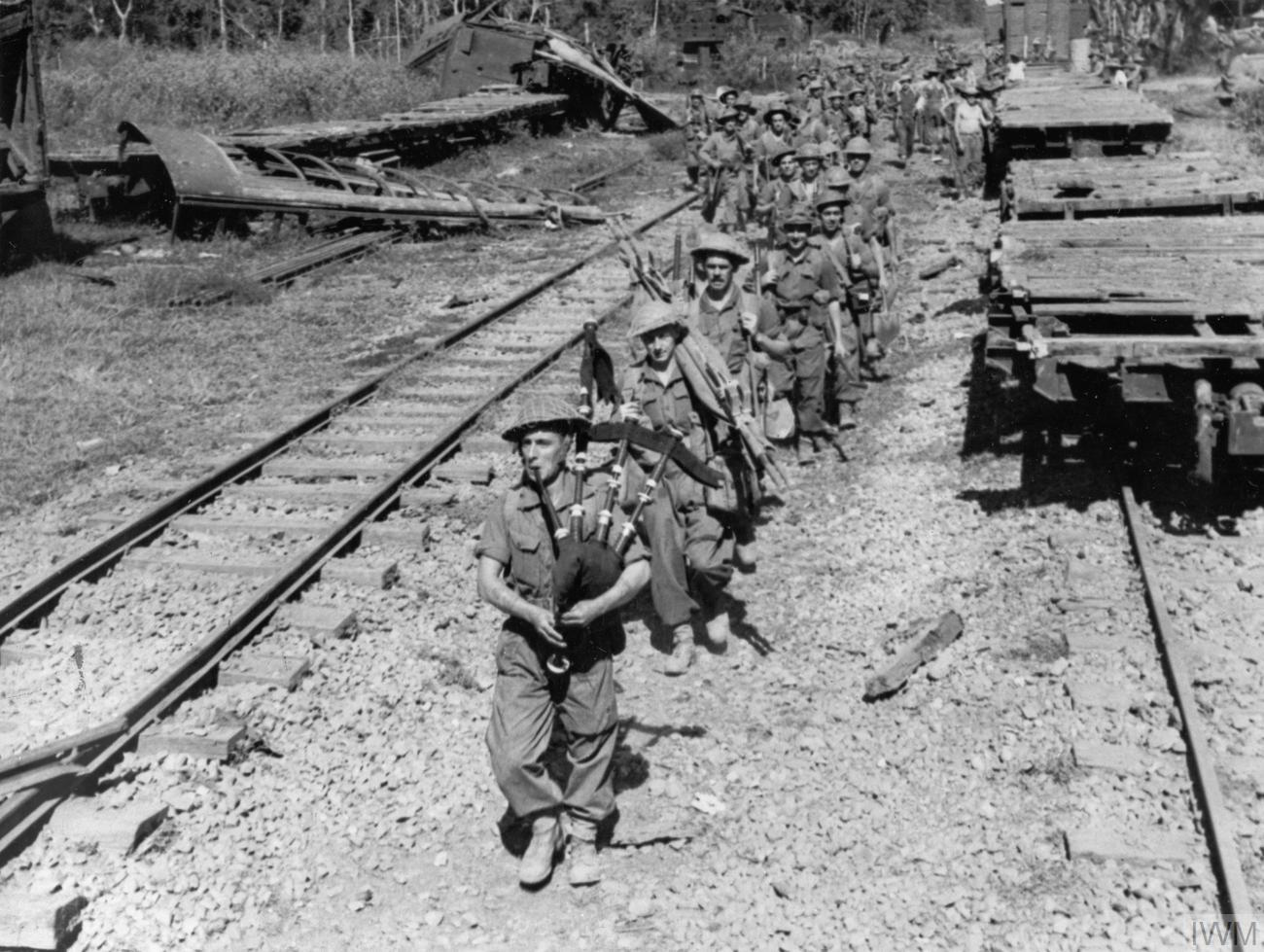
Led by Piper John McLean, men of "D" Company, 1st Royal Scots Fusiliers march alongside a railway to celebrate both St Andrew's Day and the ending of the Japanese occupation of Pinwe in North Burma, 30 November 1944.

As it was St Andrew's Day, the Royal Scots Fusiliers, paraded though the ruins of the town with bagpipes playing Cock o' the North.

The capture of Pinwe and the railway corridor broke the back of Japanese resistance on the Northern Burma sector. British casualties numbered some 400, most of which was from 72nd brigade. Japanese losses are harder to define, but the British counted eight Japanese officers and 185 other ranks killed plus. Three prisoners were also taken, but the amount of wounded was at least double the number killed.

With this part of the campaign over, the Japanese had lost several thousand men. The 36th Division continued to operate in the region between Bhamo and Lashio taking Kyaukme and Maymyo in December.

By the beginning of 1945 the NCAC forces had taken complete control of the Burma Road - quickly reopening it. The 36th Division was then sent to take part in 14th Army's offensive in central Burma. Hard fighting continued as the division pushed down the Burma Road towards the Irrawaddy and Mandalay. The Japanese were also decisively defeated at the battles of Meiktila and Mandalay.The Japanese meanwhile were forced to retreat deeper into Burma towards the Siamese border.

== Bibliography ==
- Farndale, Martin (2000). The Far East theatre, 1941-1946. Brassey's. ISBN 9781857533026.
- Luto, James (2013). Fighting with the Fourteenth Army in Burma Original War Summaries of the Battle Against Japan 1943–1945. Pen & Sword Military. ISBN 9781473831476.
- Lyman, Robert (2021). A War of Empires: Japan, India, Burma & Britain: 1941–45. Bloomsbury Publishing. ISBN 9781472847157.
- McLynn, Frank (2011). The Burma Campaign: Disaster into Triumph 1942–45. Random House. ISBN 978-1446449318.
- Romanus, Charles (1953). China-Burma-India Theater: Time Runs Out in CBI Volume 1. U.S. Government Printing Office. ISBN 9780160882319.
- Royle, Trevor (2011). The Royal Highland Fusiliers A Concise History. Mainstream Publishing. ISBN 9781780572529.
- Wells, Anne Sharp (2009). The A to Z of World War II: The War Against Japan. Scarecrow Press. ISBN 978-0-8108-7026-0.
