= 130th (Lowland) Field Regiment, Royal Artillery =

British Territorial Army unit (1939–1955)

130th (Lowland) Field Regiment, RA 330 (Lowland) Medium Regiment, RA 330 (Lowland) Light Anti-Aircraft Regiment, RA
- Royal Artillery cap badge
- Active: 12 June 1939–10 March 1955
- Country: United Kingdom
- Branch: Territorial Army
- Role: Field artillery Medium Artillery; Air Defence
- Size: 2–3 Batteries
- Part of: 15th (Scottish) Infantry Division; 14th Indian Infantry Division; 36th Indian Division
- Garrison/HQ: Kilmarnock; Troon
- Engagements: First Arakan Offensive; Second Arakan Offensive; Burma campaign (1944–1945)

Commanders
- Notable commanders: Brigadier R.A.G. Nicholson

130th (Lowland) Field Regiment was a Royal Artillery (RA) unit of Britain's part-time Territorial Army (TA) created just before World War II. It was formed from part of 79th (Lowland) Field Regiment, Royal Artillery, itself descended from the 1st Ayrshire and Galloway Artillery Volunteers, first raised in Scotland in 1859. After serving in home defence the new regiment was sent to India where it participated in the First and Second Arakan Offensives, and then in the Burma campaign (1944–1945). It was reformed in the postwar TA and continued in various roles until 1955.

== Mobilisation ==
The TA was doubled in size after the Munich Crisis of 1938, and most regiments split to form duplicates. Part of the reorganisation was that field artillery regiments changed from four six-gun batteries to an establishment of two batteries, each of three four-gun troops. For the 79th (Lowland) Fd Rgt this resulted in the following organisation from 12 June 1939:

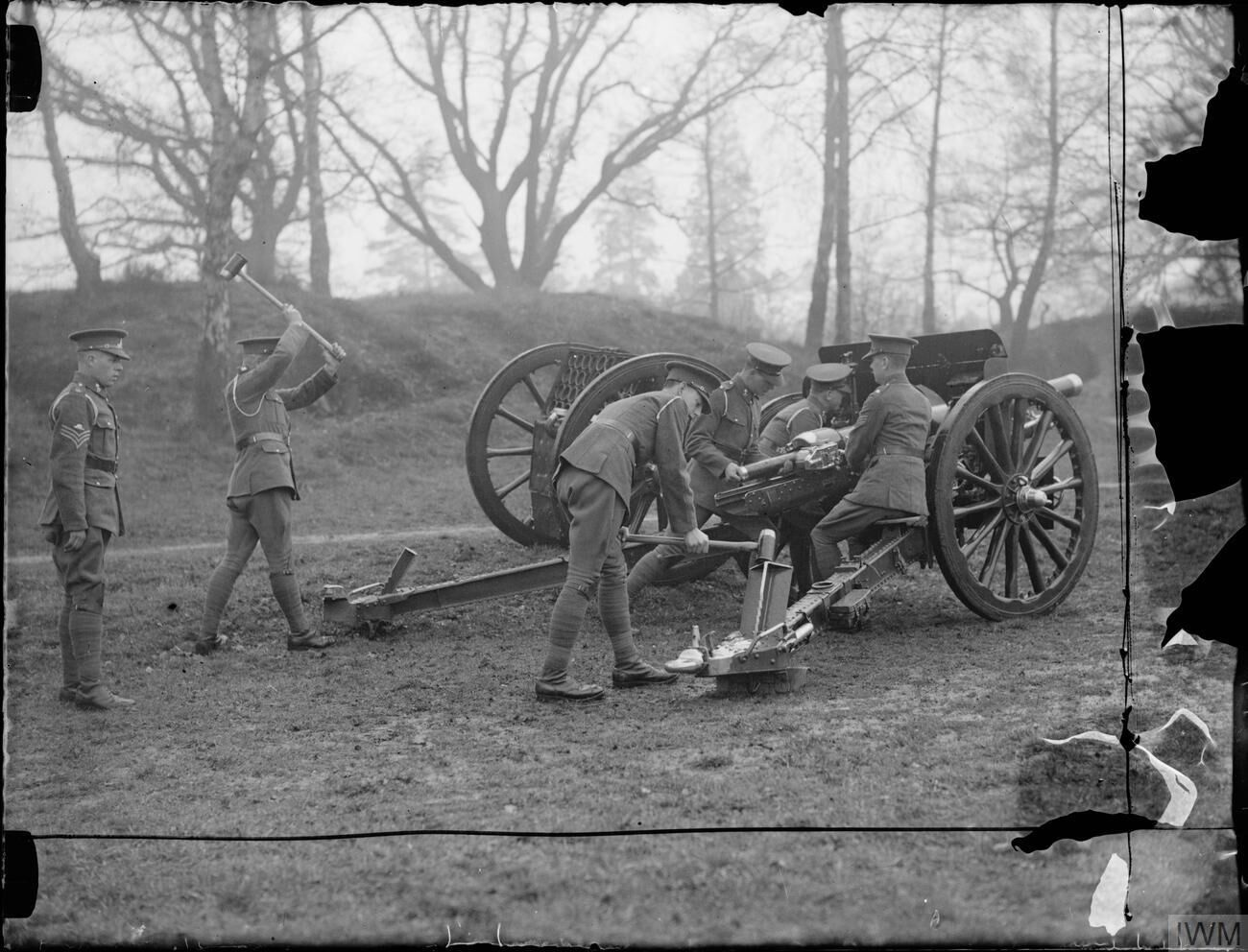
Emplacing an 18-pounder with wooden wheels at the start of World War II

79th (Lowland) Field Regiment, Royal Artillery

- Regimental Headquarters (RHQ) at Ayr
- 313 (Ayr) Field Bty
- 314 (Irvine) Field Bty

130th Field Regiment, Royal Artillery

- RHQ at Kilmarnock
- 315 (Kirkcudbright) Field Bty
- 316 (Kilmarnock) Field Bty

On the outbreak of World War IIr in September 1939, 130th Field Regiment mobilised in 15th (Scottish) Infantry Division (the duplicate of the TA's established 52nd (Lowland) Infantry Division).

== Home defence ==
Upon mobilisation, 15th (S) Division moved into the Scottish Borders to begin its training, with the artillery at Selkirk and Jedburgh. After three months it returned to winter quarters, which were chosen to meet the defence requirements of the Firth of Clyde and Firth of Forth: in the case of 130th (L) Fd Rgt, this was actually at its home base of Kilmarnock. The division marched out to the Borders to resume training in April 1940, with 130th (L) Fd Rgt at Stobs Camp, attached to 45th (Lowland) Brigade at Hawick. The division was now one of those assigned to the 'Julius Caesar' defence plan, even though it still had virtually no equipment.

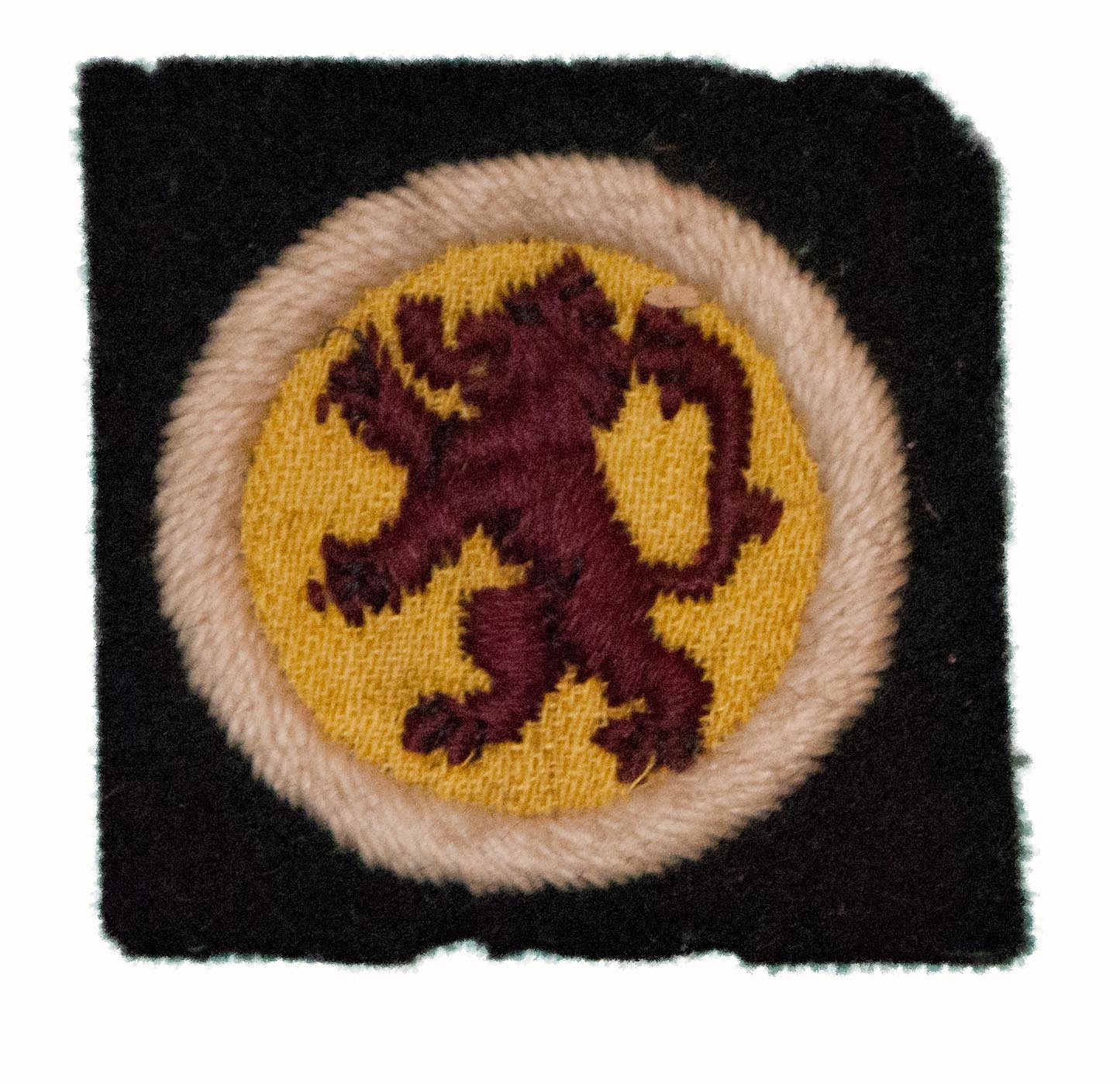
Divisional insignia of 15th (Scottish) Division, personally authorised by King George VI on 31 October 1940.

At the beginning of May the division was suddenly ordered to vacate its camps, which were required to house the troops being evacuated from the failed Norwegian campaign. It moved south to the area of Wiltshire and Berkshire under Southern Command. The German invasion of the Low Countries followed on 10 May, and four days later 15th (S) Division began moving again, this time by successive brigade groups to take up defensive positions on the south-east Essex coast under Eastern Command. 45th Brigade and the divisional troops first moved to Hertford, then from 26 May the complete division was positioned along the Essex coast under the command of XI Corps. The divisional artillery had the task of covering the whole divisional front from Southend-on-Sea to Harwich (40 miles (64 km)) from static positions with a very small number of guns. On 31 May the three field artillery regiments between them had 6 × 18-pounder guns and 12 × 4.5-inch howitzers, all of World War I vintage. After the Dunkirk evacuation this was the front line of Britain's defences.

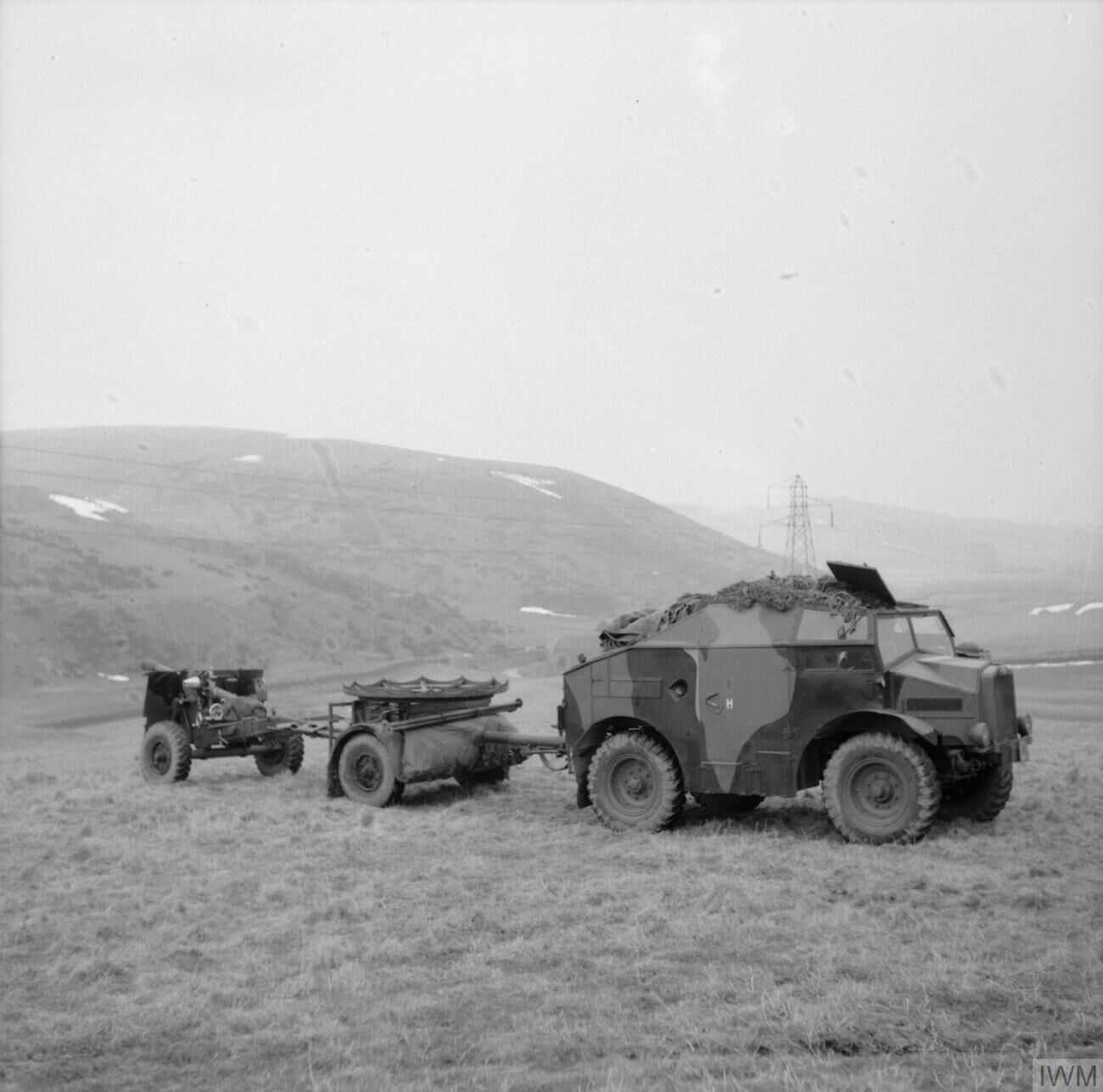
Quad tractor and 25-pounder gun on exercise in the UK, 1941.

The division remained in its positions through the autumn and into the winter of 1940-–41. As the danger of invasion receded, training was stepped up with divisional exercises. In February 1941 the division moved north to take over defence of the Suffolk coast. One of the lessons learned from the Battle of France was that the two-battery organisation did not work: field regiments were intended to support an infantry brigade of three battalions. As a result, they were reorganised into three 8-gun batteries, but it was not until late 1940 that the RA had enough trained battery staffs to carry out the reorganisation.. The regiment formed its third battery, 494 Fd Bty, by March 1941. It was authorised to use its parent regiment's 'Lowland' subtitle on 17 February 1942. A few modern Mk II 25-pounder guns began to arrive after the move to Suffolk, but it was not until September 1941 that the field regiments each had their full complement of 24 of these guns.

In November 1941 15th (S) Division was moved to Northumberland under IX Corps, but was placed on a lower establishment, recognising that it was not going to be deployed overseas in the short term. Instead, it became a feeder of men and units for other formations. 130th (Lowland) Fd Rgt left the division on 4 January 1942 and sailed to India, which urgently required reinforcements following the Japanese invasion of Malaya.

== Burma ==
14th Indian Division's insignia.

The regiment arrived in India on 31 May 1942 and went to Comilla where it came under 55th Indian Infantry Brigade, which had just come from campaigning on the North West Frontier to join 14th Indian Infantry Division. In September the rest of 14th Indian Division began moving into the Arakan to forestall a Japanese advance. On 31 October, under the command of Lt-Col R.A.G. Nicholson, 130th Fd Rgt moved with 55th Indian Bde up to the base at Chittagong. Here 494 Fd Bty was re-equipped with six 3.7-inch mountain howitzers, in anticipation of the rough country to be encountered in the forthcoming campaign; 315 and 316 Fd Btys retained their 25-pdrs.

=== First Arakan ===
14th Indian Division launched the First Arakan Offensive in late October, moving south from Cox's Bazar down the Mayu Peninsula through Maungdaw with the port of Akyab as its objective. By 18 January 1943 it was heavily engaged at Donbaik, but the guns of 130th Fd Rgt (less one battery – 16 × 25-pdrs) and 8th (Lahore) Mountain Bty (4 × 3.7s) failed to shift the defenders. 55th Indian Bde was called forward to take over the advance. It attacked with tank support on 1 February, following the artillery fireplan, but the tanks became ditched. A second attack by the infantry was halted by a Japanese hilltop bunker, 'Sugar 5', on which the 25-pdrs and 3.7s had little effect. A renewed effort was made on 18 February, reinforced by 6th British Brigade, but the Japanese held firm. To break Sugar 5, 99th (Buckinghamshire Yeomanry) Fd Rgt began digging two gun pits only 80 yards (73 m) from the bunker, while 130th Fd Rgt provided covering fire. On 22 March the pits were roofed in and ready for the 3.7s of 393 Bty of 99th Fd Rgt to move in. However, the Japanese were moving up the Mayu round 14th Indian Division's inland flank and an urgent call for artillery reinforcements on the Mayu took most of 99th Fd Rgt and a troop of 130th Fd Rgt away from Donbaik, where Lt-Col Nicholson took over command of the artillery preparations. At 08.30 on 23 March he ordered the two 3.7s of 393 Fd Bty to open fire while the three batteries of 130th Fd Rgt (24 × 25-pdrs) fired smoke to cover the hills and blind the Japanese mortar positions. However, by 09.45 each 3.7 had fired 100 rounds of high explosive (HE) shell, but Sugar 5 still stood. A 25-pdr firing armour-piercing (AP) shell was tried on the bunker, and also air attack, but these also failed, and the Japanese advance in the Mayu Valley threatened to cut off the force at Donbaik and forced its withdrawal.

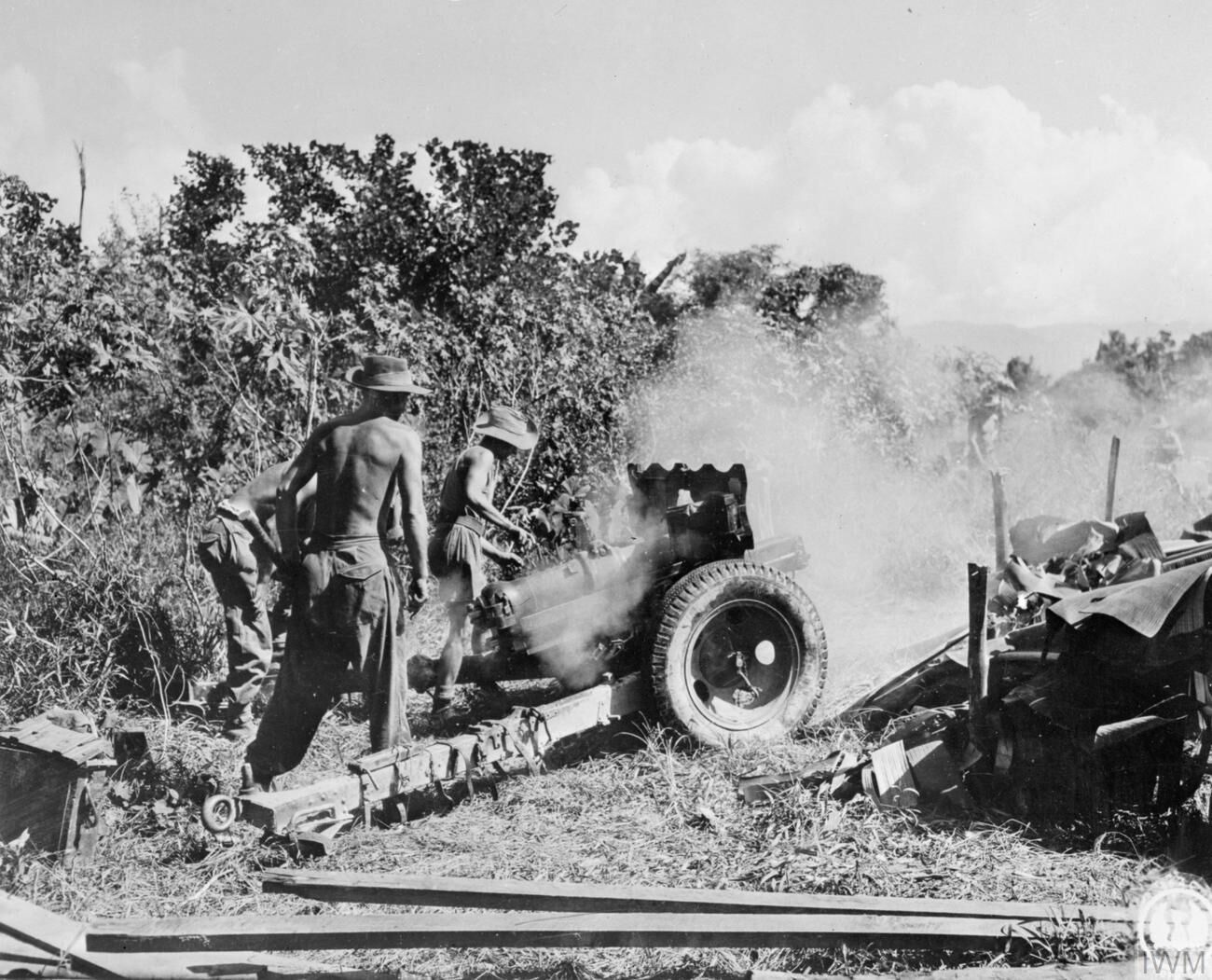
3.7-inch Howitzer in action in Burma.

6th British Brigade was ordered north to keep open the lines of communication. Its second-in-command, Col B.H. Hopkins, organised 'Hopforce' to do this, consisting of a reinforced battalion accompanied by a troop of 130th Fd Rgt. Hopforce's attempt to break through a roadblock failed, but the whole force was able to bypass it along the beach a low tide. 6th British Bde took up positions at Kwazon of the night of 5/6 April covered by the 12 25-pdrs of 494 Fd Bty and 4 3,7s of 99th Fd Rgt. Brigade HQ was positioned in small copse between the infantry and the gun area.ade HQ stayed in this vulnerable position. By 04.30 next morning Brigade HQ was surrounded, and Brigadier Ronald Cavendish ordered Nicholson to take command and organise a dawn infantry attack. Shortly afterwards Brigade HQ was overrun and Cavendish was killed. The infantry counter-attack succeeded, but by now the Japanese were threatening the gun positions. Nicholson ordered the 3.7s to fire shrapnel over the Japanese troops in the old Brigade HQ. (Note: A Japanese report suggested that Cavendish was killed by British artillery fire after being captured.) This caused chaos among the Japanese troops and the British infantry followed up, after which the artillery observation posts (OPs) brought down fire to keep the enemy at bay while a track was constructed to get the guns and transport across a tidal creek: the Quad gun tractors just made it. The rest of the guns further north fired smoke shells to cover this withdrawal, in which the gunners, infantry and mule teams passed the enemy-occupied former brigade HQ position, firing into it as they went. Beyond Kwazon, A Trp of 315 Bty and P Trp of 494 Bty unlimbered in the open and went into action against Japanese troops only 800 yards (730 m) away, firing HE, smoke and AP, while the marching column carried on to safety. The gunners then limbered up and drove away to join them. By 8 April 14 Indian Division was redeployed to cover Maungdaw, with 55th Indian Bde and 130th Fd Rgt in reserve. Later the whole force withdrew to Cox's Bazar before the Monsoon set in.

The regiment returned to the British base at Ranchi on 8 June 1943. Here it came under the command of XV Indian Corps on 7 July. On 5 August it moved back to Poona in India where it became part of 36th Indian Division on 11 August. In October 455 Independent Light Bty (a mechanised battery equipped with 3.7-inch mountain guns) came under its command. (Note: Formed at Hampstead as 55 Light Battery (Mechanised) on 23 December 1940, it was redesignated 455 (Independent) Light Battery (Mechanised) on 13 January 1941.)

=== Second Arakan ===
36th Division's insignia.

36th Indian Division was in training for amphibious operations. 455 Light Bty had previously served in the assault force for the invasion of Madagascar (Operation Ironclad) under the division's commander, Maj-Gen Francis Festing. Now the two field regiments assigned to the division, 130th (Lowland) and 178th, were designated 'Assault Field Regiments' trained for assault landings from the sea, possibly against Akyab or the Andaman Islands. 130th (Lowland) Assault Fd Rgt was equipped with 16 × 25-pdrs (315 and 316 Fd Btys) and 16 × 3.7-inch howitzers (455 Lt and 494 Fd Btys).

36th Indian Division was in reserve for the Second Arakan Offensive launched in January 1944. However, the Japanese counter-attacked fiercely in the 'Battle of the Admin Box' and the division had to be hurried up to the front. On 4 February under the command of Lt-Col H.C.B. Hall 130th Assault Fd Rgt moved to the Arakan. By early March 36 Indian Division was deployed south of Ngakyedauk ('Okeydoke') Pass and pushing eastwards to clear the railway tunnels as 7th Indian Infantry Division besieged in the 'Admin Box' was relieved. On 26 March its 72nd Indian Infantry Brigade occupied the West Tunnel area after a series of heavy bombardments. An attack by 25th Indian Division on Point 551 began on 9 April with support from part of 36th Indian Divisional artillery. The seizure of this point after days of bitter fighting effectively ended the Arakan campaign before the arrival of the Monsoon, and 36th Indian Division was withdrawn in May 1944, with 130th Assault Fd Rgt moving to Shillong on 14 May.

=== 1944–45 Campaign ===
With the projected amphibious operations cancelled because of a lack of landing craft, 36th Indian Division was made available to reinforce the Allied campaign in northern Burma. It returned its amphibious assault equipment and reorganised as a standard infantry division. It was assigned to reinforce US Gen Joseph Stilwell's Northern Combat Area Command (NCAC). In July it began to be airlifted into Myitkyina airfield to replace the exhausted Chindits, but at first no guns or transport could be sent. On 9 July 494 Bty was attached to 178th Assault Fd Rgt, which was able to fly in some mountain guns. 36th Division then began pushing along 'Railway Corridor', entirely supplied by air until the railway and roads could be repaired.

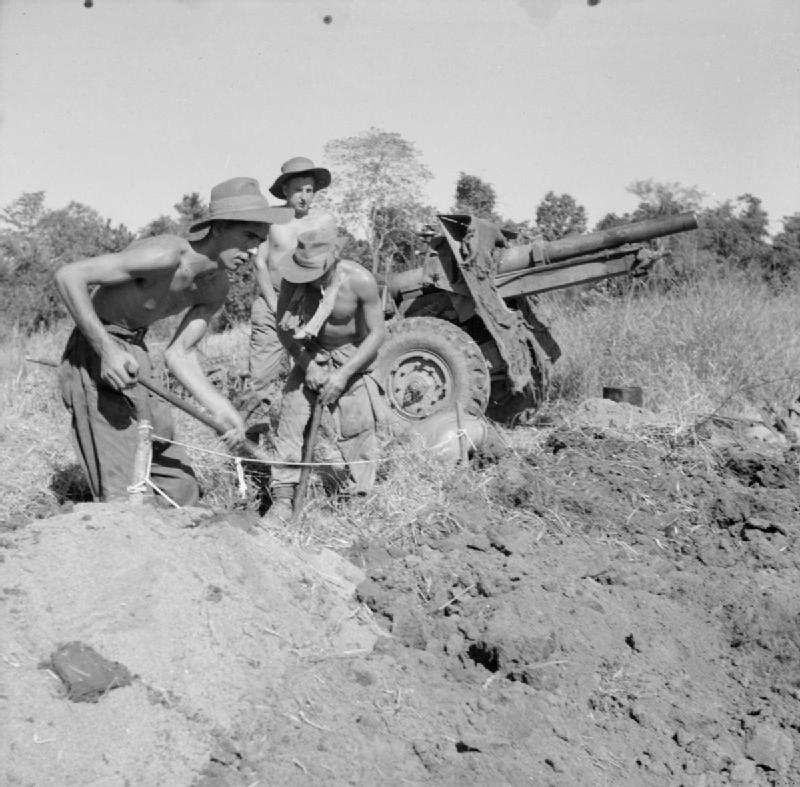
Gunners of 36th Division dig a pit for their 25-pounder gun by the Shweli River in Burma, February 1945.

The division became 36th British Division on 1 September, the majority of the Indian Army units having been transferred. 130th Field Rgt rejoined 39th Division in November, leaving behind 455 Light Bty (which was disbanded on 9 January 1945 to reform a medium battery in India). 36th Division now resumed its advance along the railway corridor, capturing Pinwe on 30 November, and occupying Indaw, Naba and Katha. It reached the Irrawaddy and Shweli Rivers without opposition during December and continued to push along the river valleys in January 1945. It only met rearguards until it found the river crossing on the Shweli bend at Myitson to be strongly held.

36th Division was now the only part of NCAC in action, on the left flank of Fourteenth Army, which was closing in on Meiktila and Mandalay in Central Burma. While the British Division forced a bridgehead at Myitson and then advanced south (supplied by air) to link up with Fourteenth Army, NCAC was broken up and its Chinese elements returned to China. By the end of March, Fourteenth Army had won the Battle of Mandalay and was preparing to advance on Rangoon.

While Fourteenth Army fought the Battle of the Rangoon Road, 36th Division cleared the area east of Meiktila, supplied by road from the Mandalay airhead and by supply drops to the forward troops by US Tenth Air Force. However, the difficulty of supplying and reinforcing British formations in Central Burma meant that 36th Division was selected to be flown out before the onset of the Monsoon and the withdrawal of US aircraft to China. On 12 May 1945 the personnel of 130th Field Rgt were flown out and then moved to the rest areas round Poona, arriving on 15 May. After its withdrawal, 36th Division was allocated to Operation Zipper (the planned amphibious invasion of Malaya), but the division was badly reduced by the 'Python' scheme whereby troops who had already served 3 years 8 months in the Far East qualified for repatriation home. The division was therefore replaced, though it assisted in equipping and preparing the other assault formations.

130th (Lowland) Fd Rg remained at Secunderabad for the rest of the war, and assed into suspended animation on 30 September 1946.

== Postwar ==
When the TA was reconstituted on 1 January 1947, the 130th reformed at Troon (later returning to Kilmarnock) as 330 (Lowland) Medium Rgt in 85 (Field) Army Group Royal Artillery. The Lowland regiments were reorganised on 1 July 1950 when 85 (Fd) AGRA became HQ 52nd (Lowland) Divisional Artillery and 330 (Lowland) Medium Rgt converted to the Light Anti-Aircraft (LAA) role. When Anti-Aircraft Command was abolished on 10 March 1955, 330 (Lowland) LAA Rgt amalgamated with its former parent regiment, now 279 (Lowland) Fd Rgt, as 279 (Ayrshire) Fd Rgt.

== Regimental commanders ==
The following officers commanded the regiment:

UK 1939–42

- Lt-Col H. Mathie, MC, TD
- Lt-Col A.N. Skinner, MVO
- Lt-Col S. Simmons
- Lt-Col R.G. Price

Far East 1942–46

- Lt-Col R.G. Price
- Lt-Col R.C. Laughton
- Lt-Col R.A.G. Nicholson
- Lt-Col H.C.B. Hall
- Lt-Col J.S. Wilkins
- Lt-Col G.G. Peel
- Lt-Col J.D.C. Thompson
- Lt-Col D.C.B. MacQueen
- Lt-Col W. Hanwell
