= Siege of Myitkyina =

Siege in Burma Campaign

Coordinates: 25°23′12″N 97°23′37″E

- Part of the Burma campaign, South-East Asian and Pacific Theaters of World War II
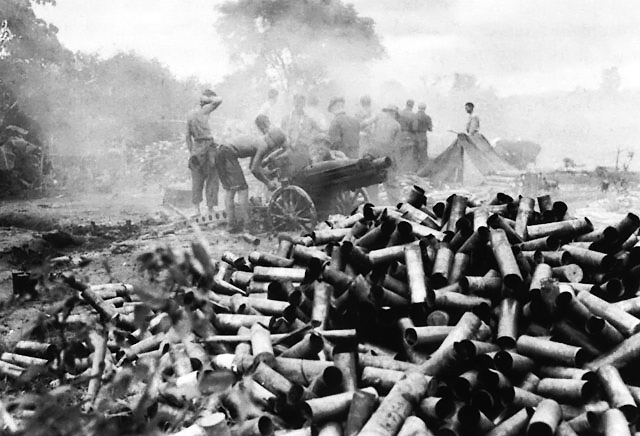
- An American M1A1 75-mm pack howitzer supports GALAHAD's operations at Myitkyina.
| Date | May 17 – August 3, 1944 (2 months, 2 weeks and 3 days) |
| Location | Myitkyina in Burma |
| Result | Allied victory |
| Territorial changes | Myitkyina captured by the Allies |

Belligerents
| China; United States; United Kingdom (air and artillery support only) | Japan; Burma |

Commanders and leaders
| (Republic of China (1912–1949)) Wei Li-huang (United States) Joseph Stilwell | (Empire of Japan) Genzo Mizukami ‡‡ |

Strength
| Chinese Expeditionary Force; Northern Combat Area Command | Garrison from the 114th Infantry Regiment of the 18th division and a battalion of the 56th division (3,000) |

Casualties and losses
| Western Claim : Chinese; 972 killed 3,184 wounded 188 invalid U.S. 272 killed 955 wounded 980 invalid Chinese Claim : Chinese; 2,414 killed 4,241 wounded 15 missing | By mid-July : 790 killed; 1,180 wounded; 182 captured Japanese record : 114th Infantry Regiment : 2,979 killed or died of illness; about 1,821 wounded; 107 captured |

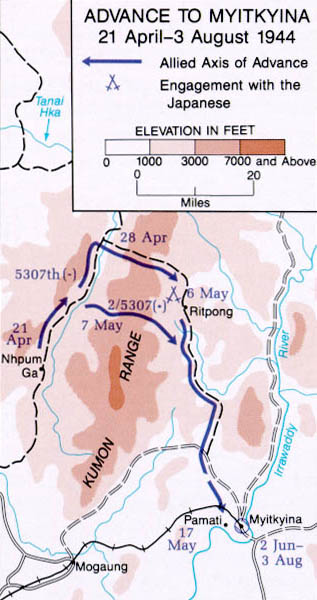
Advance to Myitkyina

The siege of Myitkyina was an engagement during the Burma campaign of World War II. The Allied victory was part of the larger Battle of Northern Burma and Western Yunnan which succeeded in opening the Ledo Road.

== Background ==
Joseph Stilwell intended to make a rapid march against Myitkyina, prophesying it to be a "feat which will live in military history". He wanted to take the town for the nearby airstrip, strategically vital to the campaign as it would be an invaluable source of supplies and aerial support in the notoriously difficult jungle fighting in the China-Burma-India Theater. Chinese Expeditionary Force (CEF) commander Wei Lihuang also played a fundamental role in striking the Imperial Japanese Army. Sun Li-Jen, as the second commander of the Chinese New 1st Army, one of the best of the Chinese National Revolutionary Army. The 1st Army had changed their equipment from old, unsuitable-for-combat caps into US-supplied M1 helmets, and had exchanged their bolt-action Type Zhongzheng rifles for newer American and British weaponry. In addition to that, the Chinese Expeditionary Force had finally received artillery and air support from the US and British forces as well, giving them a distinct advantage against the now-malnourished, low-morale Japanese forces around Myitkyina. The US and British played a relatively minor role during the battle, although they also had active combat units, such as the famed Merrill's Marauders.

== Siege ==
Stilwell gave the Chinese 22nd Division orders to advance against the bridges held by the Japanese on March 15. After two months of fighting, Myitkyina was now in reach. With the arrival of the rainy season, the incessant rain did not stop until May 17. On that day, at 10:00 p.m., the Chinese Expeditionary Force launched an attack with the US Army's Merrill's Marauders against the Japanese airstrip at Myitkyina, supported by artillery. Eight Japanese planes were quickly destroyed as the battle escalated. The Japanese were caught by surprise, and, not knowing where their enemies were, poured gasoline onto the airfield in an attempt to disable it and retreated into Myitkyina proper, intending to fight the Chinese and Americans on more favorable terms there. The Chinese and the Americans quickly overran the field relatively intact, whereupon U.S. Army Air Forces and Royal Air Force C-47 Skytrain transport aircraft moved the Chinese 89th Regiment of the 30th Division to the battlefield to supplement the exhausted CEF and Marauder units already at Myitkyina.

A stalemate ensued throughout June, but the capture of Mogaung by the British Chindits under Mike Calvert later that month was the beginning of the end for the Japanese garrison at Myitkyina. With supply lines cut, infighting grew between the two local Japanese commanders over their orders regarding the defence of the town. Stillwell had demanded that the Chindits join them but they were whittled down by disease and combat. Stillwell nevertheless was reinforced by the arrival of elements of Francis Festing's 36th Division from 15 July at Myitkyina airfield. On hearing of the weakening Japanese garrison in Myitkyina, Stillwell sent that division not to take Myitkyina but to advance on the 'Railway Corridor' from Mogaung towards Indaw on the right flank of NCAC.

On July 26, the American 3rd Battalion of the Marauders made a significant gain by capturing the northern airfield at Myitkyina and over the next week Japanese resistance was noticeably weaker.

On August 3, General Genzo Mizukami ordered the town abandoned and took his life in a literal compliance to "defend Myitkyina to the death" as the Chinese and US forces gradually cleared the city and the surrounding area of Japanese troops.

== Aftermath ==
The operations against Myitkyina was particularly hard on the Chinese Expeditionary Force, due to the hard fighting, lack of supplies, difficult terrain, and disease. Owing to excessive casualties, the unit effectively ceased to exist as a fighting force and was therefore disbanded. The long-awaited taking of Myitkyina and its airfield allowed for the opening of the Ledo Road, connecting the old Burma Road with China. The Chinese forces' casualties were the highest among all the battles during the Chinese-intervention of Burma Campaign.

=== Order of battle ===
| American-Chinese order of battle | Japanese order of battle |
|---|---|
| Chinese and American troops of the Northern Combat Area Command: General Joseph Stilwell: New 1st Army: Zheng Dongguo; 22nd Division: Liao Yaoxiang; 30th Division: Tang Shouzhi; 38th Division: Sun Li-Jen; 14th Division: Long Tianwu; 50th Division: Pan Yukun; 1st Tank Division; GALAHAD: BG Frank Merrill; 5307th Provisional Regiment; Chinese Expeditionary Force: General Wei Li-huang: 11 Army Group: Song Xilian; 2nd Army: Wang Ling-yun; 6th Army: Huang Chieh; 71st Army: Chung Pin; 20th Army Group: Huo Kuizhang; 53rd Army: Chou Fu-chen; 54th Army: Chueh Han-chien; 8th Army: Ho Shao-chou | 33rd Japanese Army: Lieutenant General Honda Masaki: 2nd Division: Okazaki; 18th Division: Tanaka; 53rd Division: Takeda; 56th Division: Matsuyama; 24th Independent Mixed Brigade: Hayashi; Myitkyina: Genzo Mizukami |
