= Battle of Northern Burma and Western Yunnan =

Battle of the Second Sino-Japanese War

Coordinates: 22.83°N 97.14°E

- Part of the Burma campaign and the Second Sino-Japanese War of World War II
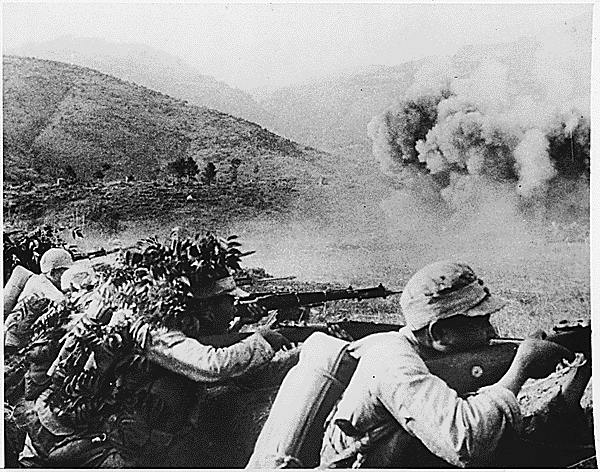
- Chinese soldiers fight along the Salween River in Burma
Date	October 1943 – March 1945
Location	Northern part of Burma and Western part of the Yunnan province in the Republic of China
Result	Allied victory

Belligerents
China; United Kingdom; United States	Japan; Thailand

Commanders and leaders
(Republic of China (1912–1949)) Long Yun (Republic of China (1912–1949)) Wei Li-huang (Republic of China (1912–1949)) Song Xilian (Republic of China (1912–1949)) Sun Li-jen	(Empire of Japan) Masakazu Kawabe (Empire of Japan) Heitarō Kimura

Strength
Western Claim : 400,000 Chinese Claim : X Force (Chinese Army in India) : 60,266 troops Y Force (Second Chinese Expeditionary Force) : 153,441 troops	Western Claim : 150,000 Chinese Claim Claim : In Northern Burma : 60,408 troops In Western Yunnan : 33,822 troops

Casualties and losses
Western Claim : 107,000 Chinese Claim : Chinese Army in India: New First Army (including attached units) : In the battles of Hukawng Valley, Mogaung Valley, and Myitkyina (October 31, 1943 to August 11, 1944) : 5,773 killed, 11,968 wounded, 88 missing In the battle of Bhamo and the ensuing pursuit operations (October 22, 1944 to March 26, 1945) : 2,626 casualties; New Sixth Army : New 22nd Division in the battle of Bhamo and 50th Division in the battles of Hsenwi, Lashio, Namtu, and Hsipaw (October 22, 1944 to March 16, 1945) unknown; Second Chinese Expeditionary Force: 31,443 killed and 35,948 wounded	Western Claim : 108,000 (at least 30,000 Japanese soldiers dead) Chinese Claim : In Western Yunnan: 25,102 killed, wounded, or captured Japanese Claim : In Western Yunnan Counterattack against the Second Chinese Expeditionary Force (29 April until 5 July 1944): 1,719 killed, 1,257 wounded, about 200 died of illness, and about 4,500 fallen ill First phase of the 'Disrupt' operation (6 July until 5 October 1944): 56th division : 4,868 killed, 1,430 wounded, 386 died of illness, and 11,081 fallen ill 2nd division : about 800 killed, about 800 wounded Second phase of the 'Disrupt' operation (5 October 1944 until 26 January 1945): 1,803 killed, 3,194 wounded, 27 died of illness, and 1,822 fallen ill Total : about 9,190 killed, about 6,681 wounded, about 613 died of illness, and about 17,403 fallen ill In Northern Burma 18th division in the battles of Hukawng and Mogaung Valleys (1 October 1943 until 10 August 1944): 55th infantry regiment and 18th mountain artillery regiment : 2,207 killed, 2,460 wounded, and 90 missing 56th infantry regiment : about 2,553 killed or died of illness, about 60 suspected to have been captured. 12th engineer regiment : about 805 killed, about 100 missing 114th infantry regiment of the 18th division in the Siege of Myitkyina (17 May until 5 August 1944): 2,979 killed or died of illness, about 1,821 wounded, and 107 captured Other units and battles : unknown

Battle of Northern Burma and Western Yunnan (Chinese: 滇西緬北戰役 October 1943 – March 1945) was the name of the Chinese campaign with their allies in the 1943–45 Burma Campaign. The campaign ended in an Allied victory.

It is one of the large-scale battles of the Second Sino-Japanese War, located in the border area between Yunnan Province, China and northern Myanmar, starting at the beginning of December 1943. The purpose of the battle is to open up the China-India Highway. At the end of March 1945, the Chinese Expeditionary Force, the British Army, and Merrill's Marauders joined forces in Muse, Burma (Myanmar), while the Japanese Army lost the North Burma Stronghold.

The Allied Forces were jointly formed by the troops of China, the United States and the United Kingdom. Among them, the Chinese participating forces included the Chinese Army in India and the Chinese Expeditionary Force. The commander-in-chief of the campaign was General Wei Lihuang of the Chinese National Army, and the deputy commander of the campaign was General Joseph Stilwell of the US Army. The main force of the Japanese army was the Japanese Burmese front. The commander of the battle was Masakazu Kawabe, then Heitaro Kimura, later Shinichi Tanaka and others. The total strength was 200,000-400,000 for Allied and 90,000-150,000 for Japan.

The Battle of Northern Myanmar and Western Yunnan lasted one and a half years. At the cost of more than 80,000 casualties, the Allies claimed to have killed more than 30,000 Japanese soldiers, reopened southwest China to the Burma Road, and recovered all the lost land on the west bank of the Salween River in western Yunnan.

== Background ==
At the turn of spring and summer in 1942, the Japanese army captured Burma and immediately prepared to attack west Yunnan. They were expected to fight along Burma Road, conquer Yunnan and threaten Chongqing. On May 4, 1942, the Japanese army invaded Longling County, and at the same time dispatched 54 aircraft to carry out a violent bombing of Baoshan, Yunnan, the Millennium Ancient City; on the 10th, the Japanese army invaded the border city of Tengchong. At this point, a large area west of the Salween River (Nu River) fell into the hands of the Japanese army. The 71st Army of the Chinese Expeditionary Force set up defenses on the east bank of the Nu River, repeatedly frustrated the Japanese army's attempt to move eastward, and thus stabilized the war situation, and confronted it across the river for two years (Defence of the Salween river).

At that time, after the Burma Road, which was once the only land international transportation artery, was cut off, a large amount of military supplies to China could only be transported by the US Air Force through "The Hump" with much difficulty and no security. In order to regain control of the Burma Road, the six divisions of the Chinese Expeditionary Forces in India and the British and Indian forces jointly launched a counterattack against the Japanese army in northern Myanmar in late October 1943, and achieved initial results. On April 17, the following year, the Chinese Expeditionary Force carried out a counter-attack plan for crossing the river.

== Battles ==
- Battle of the Hukawng Valley (30 October 1943 - 9 March 1944)
  - Battle of Yupang (30 October - 24 December 1943)
  - Battle of Maingkwan (2 March 1944 - 5 March 1944)
  - Battle of Waluban (3 March 1944 - 9 March 1944)
- Battle of Mogaung (4 June 1944 – 26 June 1944)
- Siege of Myitkyina (17 May 1944 – 3 August 1944)
- Battle of Tengchong (11 May 1944 - 13 September 1944)
- Battle of Mount Song (4 June 1944 – 7 September 1944)
- Battle of Longling (6 June 1944 - 3 November 1944)
- Battle of Mangshi (3 November 1944 – 1 December 1944)
- Battle of Bhamo (1944) (17 November 1944 – 15 December 1944)
- Battle of Mongyu (15 December 1944 - 27 January 1945)
- Battle of Wanding (27 December 1944 - 19 January 1945)
- Battle of Lashio (1945) (2 March 1945 - 7 March 1945)
- Battle of Hsipaw (11 March 1945 - 16 March 1945)

== Aftermath ==
In June 1945, the Nationalist Government awarded the Flying Tiger Flag to eleven units. The 36th, 87th, 88th, and honorary 1st divisions made outstanding achievements in recapturing Longling. The 54th corps, 198th division, and 103rd division made outstanding achievements in recapturing Mount Song and Tengchong. The new 1st army and new 6th army completed their missions in the foreign lands. The new 22nd division made outstanding achievements in Maingkwan, Kamaing, Shwegu, Hsipaw, and other places. The new 38th division made outstanding achievements in Yupang, Mogaung, Bhamo, Lashio, and other places. On September 27, 1945, the Nationalist Government awarded the Flying Tiger Flag to the 9th division of the 2nd army.

Thomas H. Morrow, a US prosecutor in 16 April 1946 collected evidence of Japanese gas warfare against Chinese in Burma and China including testimony from both Chinese and Japanese POWs who admitted to the gas attacks, mainly against civilians and Chinese soldiers with no gas masks. Japanese gas attacks against Chinese in Burma was witnessed by Americans like Colonel John H. Stodter, a Liaison officer trained in recognising gas

== See also ==
- China Burma India Theater of World War II
- Burma Campaign 1944-1945
- Battle of Yunnan-Burma Road
- Northern Combat Area Command
