= 178th Assault Field Regiment, Royal Artillery =

British Army unit during World War II

178th Assault Field Regiment, RA
- Royal Artillery cap badge
- Active: 29 January 1942– 30 November 1946
- Country: United Kingdom
- Branch: British Army
- Role: Field artillery
- Size: Regiment
- Part of: 49th (West Riding) Division; 36th Division; 23rd Indian Division
- Engagements: Second Arakan Offensive; Battle of Mandalay; Operation Zipper; Occupation of Java

178th Assault Field Regiment, Royal Artillery, was a British Army unit during World War II. Formed as a conventional field artillery regiment in 1942, it was sent to Burma where it was given a range of specialist roles, ranging from operating tracked self-propelled guns to manning light howitzers parachuted into jungle clearings. After the Japanese surrender, it saw action in the Allied Occupation of Java before disbanding in late 1946.

== Organisation ==
178th Field Regiment was formed in the Royal Artillery (RA) on 29 January 1942 in the West Country (Note: Either at Launceston, Cornwall or Great Torrington, Devon.) with the following organisation:

- Regimental Headquarters (RHQ)
- 122 Field Battery – previously independent; originally raised on 14 July 1941 in Taunton for 24th Field Regiment in the Regular Army
- 366 (10th London) Field Battery – previously independent; originally part of 140th (5th London) Field Regiment in the Territorial Army (TA); recently returned from garrison duty in Iceland
- 516 Field Battery – originally raised on 14 July 1941 in Elgin, Scotland, for 126th (Highland) Field Regiment in the TA

On 15 May 1942 the new regiment was assigned to 49th (West Riding) Infantry Division, which was being re-assembled in Western Command after a period of service in Iceland. However, on 28 December the regiment left the division and (together with its Signal Section of the Royal Corps of Signals and Light Aid Detachment of the Royal Electrical and Mechanical Engineers) came under direct control of the War Office preparatory to embarking for service overseas in March 1943.

== Burma ==
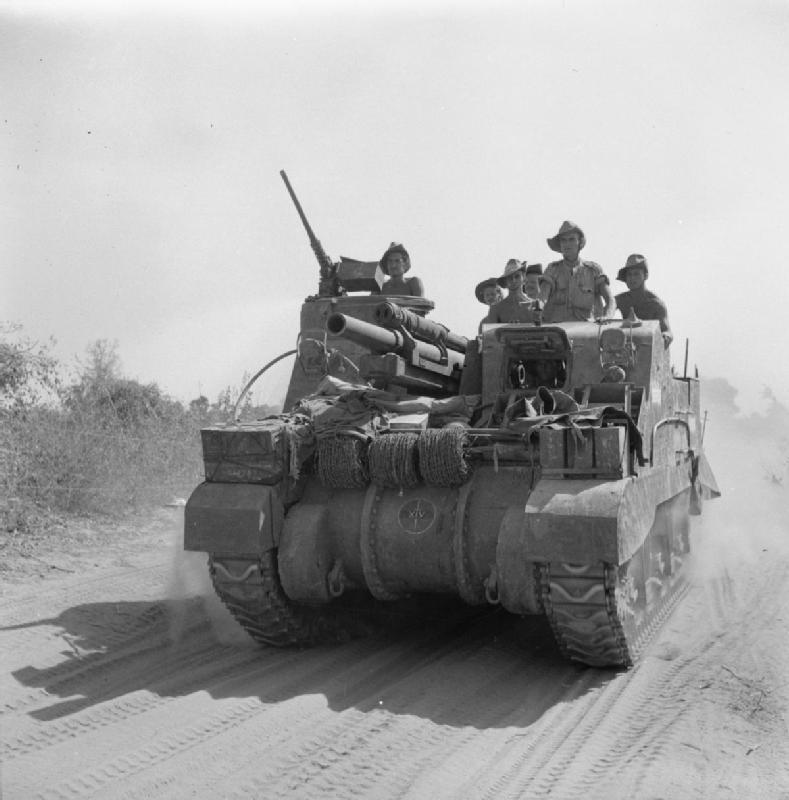
Priest SP gun in Burma.

178th Field Rgt arrived at Bombay in India on 10 June 1943 under the command of Lieutenant-Colonel K.M. Wright, and went to Bangalore where it joined XXXIII Indian Corps. On 17 July it moved to Poona and came under the command of 36th Indian Division. On 1 August it was redesignated 178th Assault Field Regiment, 122 Bty being given eight Priest 105 mm self-propelled (SP) guns and 366 Bty getting eight 3.7-inch mountain howitzers, while 516 retained the standard towed 25-pounder field gun. 'Assault Field Regiments' were equipped and trained for assault landings from the sea, but most of the planned amphibious operations in Burma were cancelled because of a lack of landing craft, even for training, before 1945. 366 Battery was sometimes referred to as 366 Light Battery because of its small guns: the 3.7-inch howitzer was also chosen for the new 'Jungle Field Regiments' because of its accuracy at close range and for its high angle fire.

=== Arakan ===
36th Indian Division was in reserve for the Second Arakan Offensive launched in January 1944. The Japanese counter-attacked fiercely in the 'Battle of the Admin Box', and the division was hurried up to the area. 178th Assault Fd Rgt moved into the Arakan on 10 February, but 122 Bty's Priests were replaced by towed 25-pounders. By early March the division was deployed south of Ngakyedauk ('Okeydoke') Pass and pushed eastwards to clear the railway tunnels as the besieged 'Admin Box' of 7th Indian Infantry Division was relieved. The regiment was attached to 25th Indian Division on 9 April for the attack on Point 551 which involved days of bitter fighting that effectively ended the Arakan campaign before the arrival of the Monsoon.

36th Indian Division was withdrawn from Arakan in May 1944 and made available to reinforce the Allied campaign in northern Burma. 178th Assault Fd Rgt rejoined it for the move to Shillong, which began on 12 May and was completed by 7 June. All the division's amphibious assault equipment was returned to the amphibious warfare training school and the division reorganised as a standard infantry division.

=== Railway Corridor ===
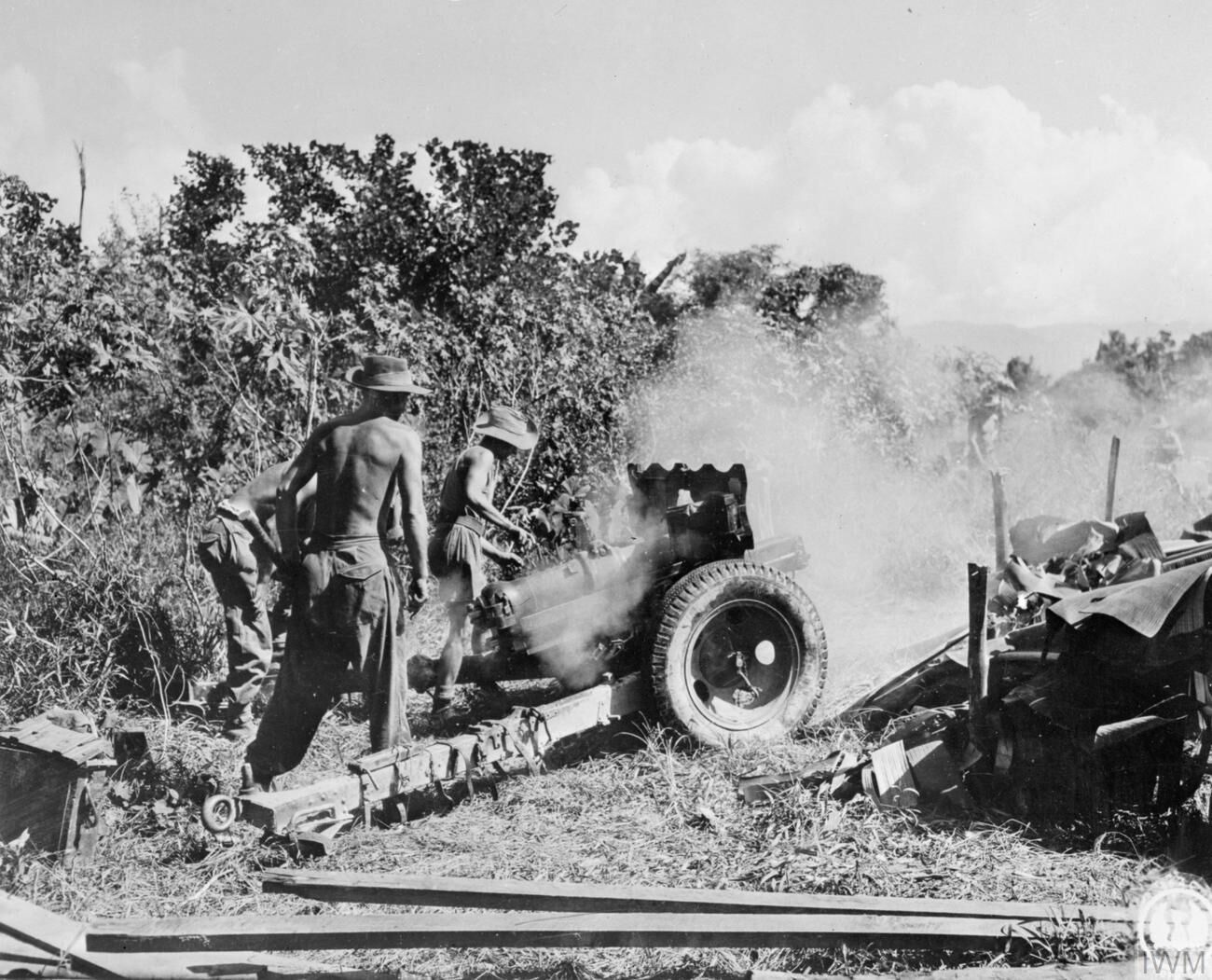
3.7-inch Howitzer in action in Burma.

36th Indian Division was now assigned to reinforce US Gen Joseph Stilwell's Northern Combat Area Command (NCAC). In July it moved to Ledo, where the infantry units began to be airlifted into Myitkyina airfield to replace the exhausted Chindits. At first no guns or transport could be sent, the divisional artillery remaining at Shillong. However, 178th Assault Fd Rgt, with 321 Anti-Tank Bty attached from 122nd (Royal Warwickshire Regiment) Light Anti-Aircraft/Anti-Tank Rgt, and 494 Field Bty attached from 130th (Lowland) Assault Field Rgt, moved up to Ledo ready to move into the forward area. On 18 August, while 36th Division was advancing on the Japanese stronghold of Pinbaw, it was augmented by six of 366 Lt Bty's mountain howitzers, which were successfully dropped by parachute close to the tactical HQ of 29th Brigade. Pinbaw was captured on 25 August, although most of the supporting bombardment came from aircraft of US Tenth Air Force. 36th Division then began pushing along 'Railway Corridor', entirely supplied by air until the railway and roads could be repaired.

On 1 September 1944, 36th Indian Division was redesignated as a British division, the majority of the Indian Army units having been transferred. The gunners of the rest of 178th Assault Fd Rgt were flown into Burma to join the division on 15 October (321 A/T Bty having returned unused to Shillong in September). When NCAC began its post-Monsoon offensive on 16 October 1944, 36th Division was the only formation in contact with the enemy, and was the first to run into heavy opposition on 25 October, at a Japanese defensive position that blocked all roads. This was broken through on 29 October and Mawlu occupied on 31 October, but then the Japanese began to raid the division's precarious supply route and the advance halted until the following Chinese division broke through to Mawlu. Resuming its advance along the railway corridor, 36th Division captured Pinwe on 30 November, and occupied Indaw, Naba and Katha, reaching the Irrawaddy and Shweli Rivers without opposition during December. It continued to push along the river valleys in January 1945, meeting occasional rearguards, until it found the river crossing on the Shweli bend at Myitson to be strongly held.

=== Meiktila and Mandalay ===
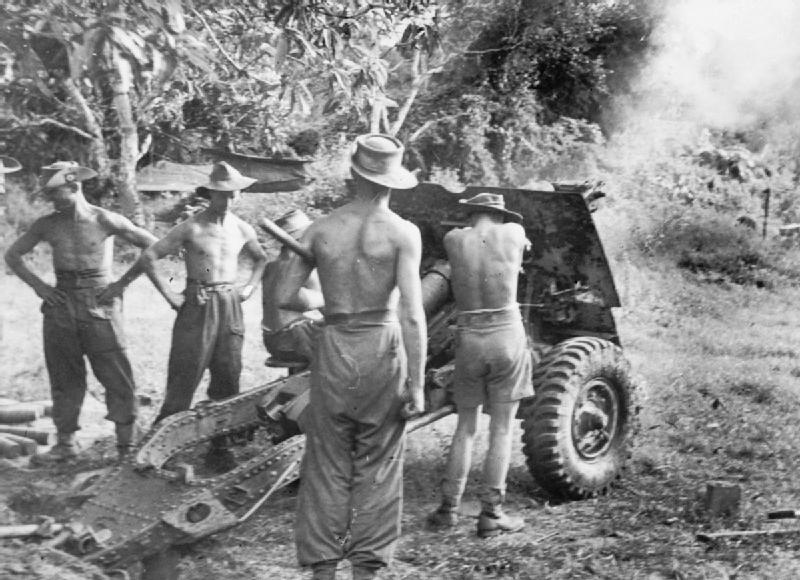
A 25-pounder of 36th Division in action in Burma, 1944.

36th Division was now the only part of NCAC in action, on the left flank of Fourteenth Army, which was closing in on Meiktila and Mandalay in Central Burma. While the British Division forced a bridgehead at Myitson and then advanced south (supplied by air) to link up with Fourteenth Army, NCAC was broken up and its Chinese elements returned to China. By the end of March, Fourteenth Army had won the Battle of Mandalay and was preparing to advance on Rangoon.

While Fourteenth Army fought the Battle of the Rangoon Road, 36th Division cleared the area east of Meiktila, supplied by road from the Mandalay airhead and by supply drops to the forward troops by US Tenth Air Force. However, the difficulty of supplying and reinforcing British formations in Central Burma meant that 36th Division was selected to be flown out before the onset of the Monsoon and the withdrawal of US aircraft to China. On 5 May 1945 178th Assault Fd Rgt was flown to Imphal, and then moved to the rest areas round Poona, arriving on 15 May.

== Operation Zipper ==
While 36th Division remained in India for the rest of the war, 178th Assault Fd Rgt left on 5 July 1945 and moved to Nazik, where it joined 23rd Indian Division two days later. This division was preparing for Operation Zipper, an amphibious invasion of Malaya to be launched from India. The division was intended to sail from Bombay and Madras to make an assault landing on beaches near Port Dickson and then capture that harbour. The operation was planned for 9–12 September 1945, but following the Atomic bombing of Hiroshima and Nagasaki the Japanese surrender was signed on 2 September. Nevertheless, Zipper went ahead, without the preliminary bombardment, and greeted by a Japanese envoy to arrange the surrender of Japanese forces in Malaya and takeover by British and Indian forces. The landing beaches proved troublesome, and vehicles could not be unloaded until 12 September. 23rd Division took over the Seremban–Cape Rachado–Port Dickson area, sending out columns to disarm Japanese troops and put down banditry and inter-communal fighting that had broken out.

== Occupation of Java ==
23rd Division's stay in Malaya was brief because it was required in Java in the Netherlands East Indies. The British and Indian troops were only expected to take the Japanese surrenders and coordinate the repatriation of Prisoners of War. However, an independent state had been declared and there was a state of civil war between the nationalists and the Dutch colonial forces. An Allied Occupation became necessary. The first British battalion to land at Batavia had to deal with looting, arson and riots. On 3 October it was joined by 1st Indian Brigade Group, including 178th Assault Fd Rgt. The gunners took over guarding internment camps, the airfield and the dock area. The brigade was soon fully occupied in trying to maintain order in the face of looting and murders, and reinforcements had to be sent. British and Indian troops were engaged in serious actions across the island and suffered considerable casualties, while the released prisoners, internees and refugees were collected at Batavia where they could be protected. By early 1946 the situation was quieter and evacuation of Japanese troops and displaced persons continued, but armed clashes still occurred. The whole of 23rd Division was moved to the Bandoeng–Buitenzorg area in February to deal with a reported build-up of extremists in the area. Because of raids on the roads, convoy protection required tanks and 25-pounders fighting pitched battles, and the division and the internees had to be supplied by air. The Royal Netherlands Army arrived in March to take over responsibility, but 23rd Division was retained in west Java until the autumn while evacuation of internees continued.

178th Assault Fd Rgt was joined on 1 June 1946 by 395 Bty from 145th (Berkshire Yeomanry) Fd Rgt which was being placed in suspended animation. 395 Battery in turn disbanded on 14 September. 23rd Division began to withdraw from Java in stages in the autumn. Regimental HQ of 178th Assault Fd Rgt disbanded at Batavia on 30 November 1946 and the two TA batteries (366 and 514) were placed in suspended animation pending the reform of their parent regiments in the UK in 1947.
