= 178th Regiment =

178th Regiment may refer to:

- 178th Assault Field Regiment, Royal Artillery
- 178th Infantry Regiment (United States)
- 178th (Lowland) Medium Regiment, Royal Artillery

== American Civil War regiments ==
- 178th New York Infantry Regiment
- 178th Ohio Infantry Regiment
