= Operation Capital =

During the Second World War, Operation Capital, Operation Y, was a broad British offensive launched on 19 November 1944 from Assam, India across the Chindwin River into northeast Burma near Mandalay. The objectives were to clear Japanese forces from northern Burma, reopen the Burma Road supply route to China and tie down Japanese forces to prevent their transfer to the Pacific theatre. The British Fourteenth Army struck the Japanese Fifteenth Army near Imphal and Kohima. The Japanese were forced to pull back to a line from Indaw to Mandalay, vacating most of Burma. The important railway corridor centered around Pinwe was captured after tough fighting in November.

During planning, the operation was renamed Extended Capital to include a pursuit of the enemy to Rangoon.

See Battle of Meiktila and Mandalay for a fuller description of this operation and its context.
