= General St John =

General St John may refer to:

- Frederick St John (British Army officer) (1765—1844), British Army general
- Henry St John (British Army officer) (1738–1818), British Army general
- Roger St John (1911–1998), British Army major general
