= 36th Infantry Division (United Kingdom) =

36th Indian Infantry Division 36th British Infantry Division
- The divisional insignia
- Active: 1944–1945
- Allegiance: (British Raj) British India; United Kingdom
- Branch: British Indian Army; British Army
- Type: Infantry
- Size: Division
- Engagements: Second World War

Commanders
- Notable commanders: Francis Festing

The 36th Indian Infantry Division was an infantry division of the Indian Army during the Second World War. The division was subsequently redesignated as a British Army formation, the 36th Infantry Division in September 1944. It served in India and during the Burma Campaign. After the end of the war it was disbanded and its remaining British units were transferred to the British 2nd Infantry Division.

== History ==
=== 36th Indian Division ===
The division was formed in India on 15 December 1942. Its constituent formations were the 29th Infantry Brigade Group (under command from 26 January 1943), which had already fought as an independent brigade in the Battle of Madagascar, and 72nd Indian Infantry Brigade confusingly composed of entirely British combat units. 72nd Indian Infantry Brigade was re-designated the new 72nd Infantry Brigade (the previous 72 Inf Bde had become 5th Parachute Brigade on 28 April 1943). Most of the division's engineer, medical and service units were Indian. The division's formation sign was two interlinked rings, one white and one red, on a black square background.

In January 1943, Brigadier Francis Festing was promoted from command of the 29th Brigade to that of the division. (His replacement as commander of 29th Brigade was Brigadier Hugh Stockwell.) Parts of the division were present in the First Arakan campaign in early 1943. It was intended that part of the division was to launch an amphibious assault on Akyab Island, but this operation was cancelled.

The division was initially in reserve for the Second Arakan campaign in early 1944, but was called on to relieve the besieged 7th Indian infantry Division after early setbacks. After the Japanese were defeated at the Battle of Ngakyedauk, 7th Division was withdrawn and 36th Division took over the offensive in the Kalapanzin River Valley. Units of the division captured the vital eastern railway tunnel linking the Kalapanzin valley with the port of Maungdaw.

The division withdrew for a brief rest at Shillong in Assam, and was then despatched to Ledo, where it came under command of the American-led Northern Combat Area Command.

=== 36th Infantry Division ===
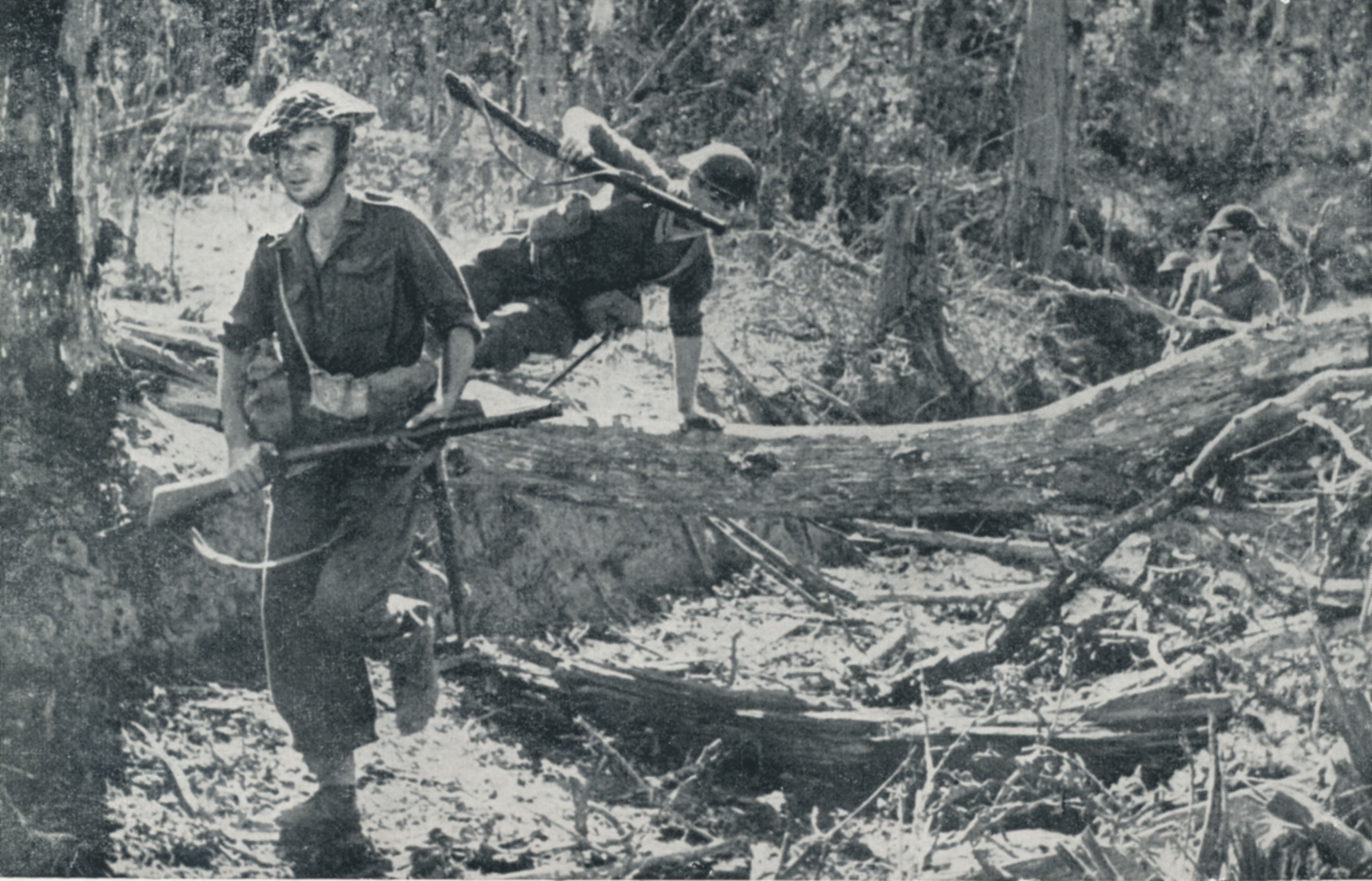
Men of the Royal Scots Fusiliers, 36th Infantry Division, advancing near Pinwe, December 1944.

Early in July 1944, the division started to fly into Myitkyina airfield in North Burma, with 72nd Brigade being the first formation to land. On 1 September 1944, shortly after the division had started advancing down the "Railway valley" from Mogaung towards Indaw on the right flank of NCAC, the division was renamed the British 36th Division. In November the division took part in the brutal fighting around Pinwe which they captured after nearly two weeks of fighting. On 14 December, a third brigade was added to the division; confusingly, this was the first Indian formation that the division commanded (the 26th Indian Infantry Brigade, of one British and two Indian battalions).

The division was distinguished for being the only British division to rely entirely on air supply, mainly by the United States' Tenth Air Force, for an extended period. The United States Army Air Force also provided the division with 12 light aircraft equipped for casualty evacuation and a US Army engineer company to construct its airstrips. Initially, the division was without its own divisional artillery and instead relied on a Chinese artillery group under US command.

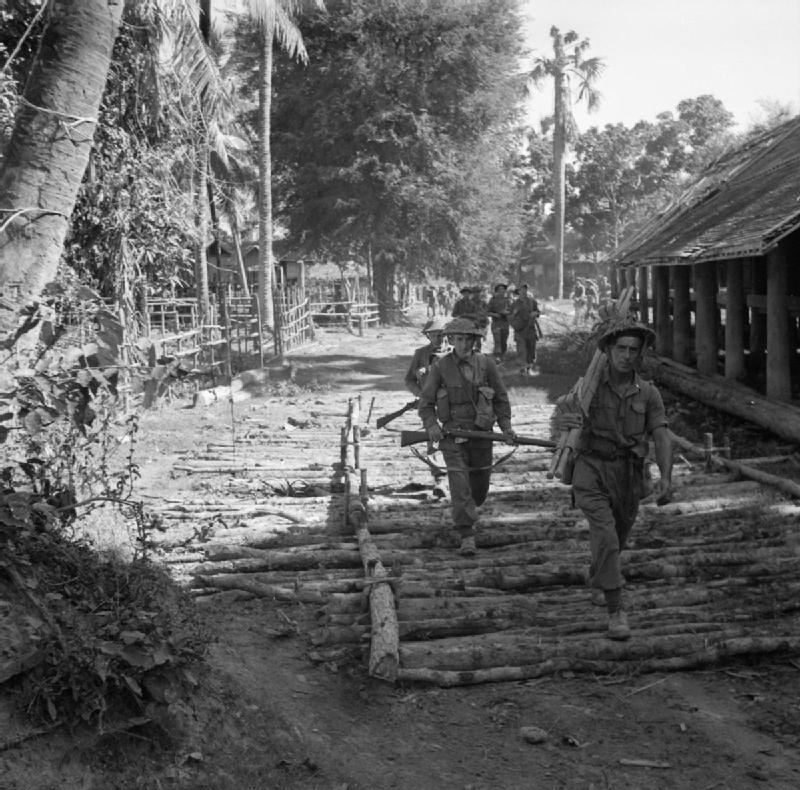
Men of the 6th Battalion, South Wales Borderers, 36th Infantry Division, march through Bahe en route for Mandalay, January 1945.

The division, having linked up with the main body of Lieutenant General William "Bill" Slim's British Fourteenth Army, crossed the Irrawaddy River and advanced independently down the eastern side of the river. Units from the division suffered losses forcing the crossing the 300 yard wide Shweli River, but the division continued to advance until the fall of Mandalay in March 1945. On 1 April 1945 the division transferred from NCAC to Fourteenth Army. The 26th Indian Brigade became the 26th British Brigade on 6 April.

As there were now more troops in Burma than could be supplied (and the transport aircraft allocated to NCAC were being withdrawn to China), the division was returned to India, officially arriving on 12 May, and joined XXXIV Corps (India) on 28 May.

== Order of battle ==
36th Infantry Division (Burma, 1944)

29th British Infantry Brigade

- 1st Battalion, Royal Scots Fusiliers
- 2nd Battalion, Royal Welch Fusiliers
- 2nd Battalion, East Lancashire Regiment
- 2nd Battalion, South Lancashire Regiment (until 16 March 1944)

(25 May 1945 – 31 August 1945)

- 2nd Battalion, Queen's Royal Regiment (West Surrey)
- 1st Battalion, Cameronians (Scottish Rifles)
- 1st Battalion, Essex Regiment

(These three battalions were all former Chindit units)

72nd British Infantry Brigade

- 6th Battalion, South Wales Borderers
- 9th Battalion, Royal Sussex Regiment
- 10th Battalion, Gloucestershire Regiment

26th Indian Infantry Brigade (under command from December 1944)

- 2nd Battalion, Buffs (Royal East Kent Regiment)
- 2nd Battalion, 8th Punjab Regiment
- 1st Battalion, 19th Hyderabad Regiment
- 1st Battalion, 1st Gurkha Rifles

26th British Infantry Brigade (converted from 26th Indian Infantry Brigade 6 April 1945

- 2nd Battalion, Buffs (Royal East Kent Regiment)
- 1st Battalion, Devonshire Regiment
- 1st Battalion, Northamptonshire Regiment

Divisional Troops

- 36th Infantry Divisional artillery, Royal Artillery
  - 130th (Lowland) Assault Field Regiment, Royal Artillery (315, 316 & 494 Batteries) (11 August 1943 – 13 June 1945)
  - 178th Assault Field Regiment, Royal Artillery (122, 366 & 516 Batteries) (17 July 1943 – 5 July 1945)
  - 145th (Berkshire Yeomanry) Field Regiment, Royal Artillery (22 June 1945 – 13 July 1945)
  - 158th Field Regiment, Royal Artillery (8 July 1945 – 31 August 1945)
  - 8th Field Regiment, Royal Artillery (20 July 1945 – 31 August 1945)
  - 32nd Mountain Regiment (12, 17 & 28 Batteries), Royal Indian Artillery (6 February 1945 – 31 August 1945)
  - 12th and 28th Indian Mountain Batteries, Royal Indian Artillery (3 December 1944 – 5 February 1945)
  - 122nd Light Anti Aircraft/Anti-Tank Regiment, Royal Artillery (400 & 402 LAA Batteries and 168 & 321 Atk Batteries)(31 November 1943 – 14 September 1944)
  - 122nd Anti-Tank Regiment, Royal Artillery (168, 321 & 402 Batteries) (15 September 1944 – 20 August 1945)
  - 59th Light Anti Aircraft Regiment, Royal Artillery (19 May 1944 – 31 August 1944)
- Divisional Engineers
  - 236 Field Company, Royal Engineers
  - 30 Field Company, Royal Bombay Sappers and Miners, Indian Engineers
  - 324 Field Park Company, Royal Bombay Sappers and Miners, Indian Engineers
  - 15 Indian Engineer Battalion, Indian Engineers
  - 12 Bridging Section, Royal Bombay Sappers and Miners, Indian Engineers
- D Company, 2nd Battalion, Manchester Regiment (Machine Guns)
- 88th Indian Infantry Company (8th Gurkha Rifles) (Divisional HQ Company)
- 2nd Battalion, Leicestershire Regiment (Defence Battalion) (20 May 1945 – 31 August 1945)
- 1st Battalion, 7th Rajput Regiment (Machine Gun Battalion) (22 June 1945 – 31 August 1945)
- 2nd Battalion, Border Regiment (Reconnaissance Battalion) (10 April 1945 – 31 August 1945)

== Sources ==
- Nesbit, Roy Conyers (2009). The Battle for Burma. Pen and Sword. ISBN 978-1844159550.
- Foster, Geoffry (1946). 36th Division - North Burma - 1944–45.
- Granillo, Mandy. When Britain Feared None.
- Renaldi, Richard A.; Rikhe, Ravi (2011). Indian Army Order of Battle. Tiger Lily Books: A division of General Data LLC. ISBN 978-0-9820541-7-8.
- Slim, William (1956). Defeat Into Victory. London: Cassell. OCLC 253543428.
