= 26th Indian Infantry Brigade =

- Active: 1941–1945
- Country: (British Raj) British India
- Allegiance: British Empire
- Branch: British Indian Army
- Type: Infantry
- Size: Brigade
- Engagements: Western Desert Campaign; Burma Campaign

The 26th Indian Infantry Brigade was an infantry brigade formation of the Indian Army during World War II. It was formed in March 1941, at Secunderabad, India and assigned to the 6th Indian Infantry Division. The brigade was part of the Line of Communication troops in both Iran and Iraq, until August 1942, when it was sent to Egypt. It remained in Egypt until January 1943, when it was reunited with the 6th Indian Division. In July 1944, it came under direct command of the Southern Army in India and was then attached to the British 36th Infantry Division between December 1944 and August 1945.

== Formation ==
- 1st Battalion, 19th Hyderabad Regiment April 1941 to April 1945
- 1st Battalion, 1st Gurkha Rifles April 1941 to January 1945 and March to April 1945
- 1st Battalion, 9th Gurkha Rifles April 1941 to November 1942
- Y Field Regiment, Royal Artillery May to June 1942
- 165th Field Regiment, Royal Artillery June to August 1942
- 2nd Battalion, Buffs (Royal East Kent Regiment) December 1942 to April 1945
- 159th Field Regiment, Royal Artillery July to December 1944
- 2nd Battalion, 8th Punjab Regiment September 1944 to March 1945
- 58th Field Company, Indian Engineers July to December 1944

== See also ==
- List of Indian Army Brigades in World War II
