= 53rd Division (Imperial Japanese Army) =

- Active: 1941–1945
- Country: Empire of Japan
- Branch: Imperial Japanese Army
- Type: Infantry
- Size: Division
- Garrison/HQ: Kyoto
- Nickname: Peace division
- Engagements: Battle of Imphal; Battle of Meiktila and Mandalay; Battle of Mogaung; Battle of the Sittang Bend

The 53rd Division (第53師団, Dai-gojūsan Shidan) was an infantry division of the Imperial Japanese Army. Its call sign was the Peace Division (安兵団, Yasushi Heidan). It was formed on 16 September 1941 at Kyoto and initially assigned to Central District Army. The nucleus for the division formation was the headquarters of the 16th division. The men of the 53rd Division were drafted from Shiga, Fukui, Mie and Kyoto prefectures, belonging to Kyoto mobilization district.

The 53rd Division was initially assigned as the reserve of the Southern Expeditionary Army Group in November 1943. In December 1943, the division sailed from Moji, with a stop-over in Kaohsiung and in January 1944 landed in Saigon and Singapore. On 29 April 1944, the division was assigned to the 33rd army, and arrived in the northern outskirts of Mandalay on 13 May 1944.

In June 1944 the 153rd Infantry Regiment was detached to reinforce the 33rd division in the ailing Battle of Imphal and was largely wiped out. The main body of the division took part in several battles against the Chindits, a large British and Indian long-range penetration force which was operating north of Indaw. In late May, they defeated a Chindit brigade to clear the lines of communication to the 18th division, but at the end of June the division was driven from Mogaung, with 1600 casualties.

From January 1945, the division was used as a reserve force in the Battle of Meiktila and Mandalay, with the main body of the 53rd division staying south of Mandalay. The 119th infantry regiment was attached to the 18th division for its attacks on Meiktila. After the attacks on Meiktila were broken off, the remnants of the division attempted to hold a position near Pyawbwe but were overrun by allied tanks.

Finally, after retreating south, the division suffered further heavy casualties to artillery fire and airstrikes in the Battle of the Sittang Bend in July–August 1945. The remnants of the division ceased fighting on the lower Sittang River on 17 August 1945, after the surrender of Japan.

== Notes ==
- This article incorporates material from Japanese Wikipedia page 第53師団 (日本軍), accessed 3 June 2016

== See also ==
- List of Japanese Infantry Divisions

== Reference and further reading ==
- Allen, Louis (1984). Burma: The longest War 1941-45. J.M. Dent & Sons. ISBN 0-460-02474-4.
- Madej, Victor (1981). Japanese Armed Forces Order of Battle, 1937–1945. Allentown, PA: Game Publishing Company. OCLC 8930220.
