= Huo Kuizhang =

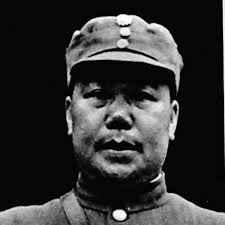
- Born: 1901; Hunan
- Died: March 9, 1953 (aged 51–52)
- Allegiance: Republic of China
- Branch: National Revolutionary Army
- Rank: lieutenant general
- Commands: 20th Army Group
- Conflicts: Second Sino-Japanese War; Second Battle of Changsha; Battle of Yunnan-Burma Road; Battle of Northern Burma and Western Yunnan; Second Burma Expedition

Huo Kuizhang (Chinese: 霍揆章; pinyin: Huò Kuízhāng; 1901 – 9 March 1953) was a KMT general from Hunan. He was appointed a major general on April 13, 1935, and promoted to lieutenant general in May 1937. He commanded the 20th Army Group from July 1940 to June 1945. He fought against the Imperial Japanese Army in Changsha, Yunnan and Burma.

After the assassination of Wen Yiduo by the KMT in 1946, Huo was dismissed as the Yunnan garrison commander.
