= Roger St John =

British Army officer (1911–1998)

Major-General Roger St John CB MC
- Born: 4 October 1911
- Died: 15 October 1998 (aged 87)
- Military career
- Allegiance: United Kingdom
- Branch: British Army
- Service years: 1931−
- Rank: Major-General
- Service number: 52703
- Unit: Royal Northumberland Fusiliers
- Commands: 1st Battalion, Royal Northumberland Fusiliers; 11th Infantry Brigade Group
- Conflicts: Second World War
- Awards: Companion of the Order of the Bath; Military Cross

Major-General Roger Ellis Tudor St John, CB, MC (4 October 1911 – 15 October 1998) was a British Army officer.

== Military career ==
Educated at Wellington College, Berkshire and the Royal Military College, Sandhurst, St. John was commissioned into the Royal Northumberland Fusiliers on 27 August 1931. He served in the Second World War as brigade major for the 11th Armoured Division and, after the war, went on to become commanding officer of the 1st Battalion Royal Northumberland Fusiliers in 1953 and commander of 11th Infantry Brigade Group in 1957.

He became colonel of the Royal Northumberland Fusiliers in October 1965.

Military offices
Preceded by Sir Francis Festing	Colonel of the Royal Northumberland Fusiliers; 1965–1968	Succeeded by Regiment amalgamated
