= Pinwe =

- Village
- Location within Myanmar
- Coordinates: 24°20′26″N 96°11′36″E
- Country: Myanmar
- Region: Sagaing Region
- District: Katha District
- Township: Indaw Township

Population (2014 Census)
  - Total: 2,955
- Time zone: UTC+6.30 (MST)

Pinwe (Burmese: ပင်ဝယ်ရွာ) is a village in Indaw Township, Katha District, in the Sagaing Region of northern-central Myanmar.

The village has a railway station on the Mandalay–Myitkyina line.

== History ==
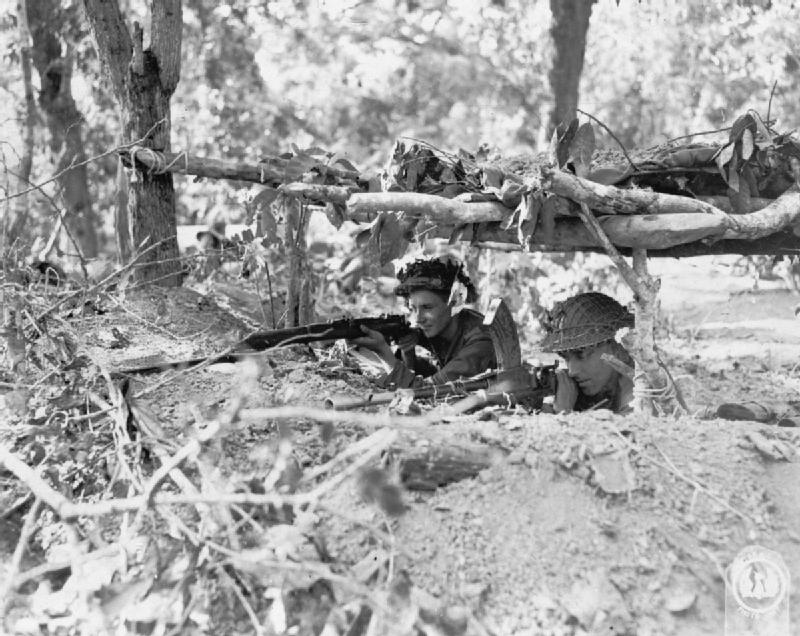
A Bren gun team of 36th Infantry Division man a front-line position during the final assault on Pinwe, 22 November 1944.

During the Burma campaign it was the site of a three-week-long battle, which resulted in Pinwe being captured by the 36th Infantry Division, from Japanese forces, on 30 November 1944.
