= Battle of Mogaung =

1944 WWII conflict in Burma

- Part of Operation Thursday in the Burma campaign of World War II
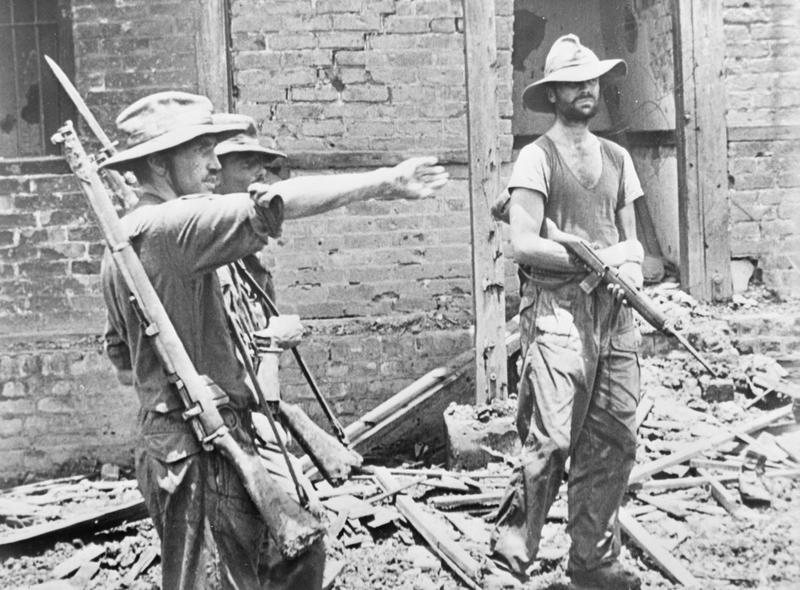
- Brigadier Mike Calvert (left) gives orders to Lieutenant-Colonel Shaw, with (right) Major James Lumley after the capture of Mogaung.
Date	June 6–26, 1944 (2 weeks and 6 days)
Location	Mogaung town in Burma 25°18′0″N 96°56′0″E
Result	Allied victory

Belligerents
United Kingdom; China; Air Support: United States	(Empire of Japan) Japan

Commanders and leaders
(United Kingdom) Mike Calvert	(Empire of Japan) Hisashi Takeda

Units involved
(United Kingdom) 77th Brigade (Republic of China (1912–1949)) 114th Regiment	(Empire of Japan) 53rd Division (elements)

Strength
3,500 men	4,000 men

Casualties and losses
776	1,600

The Battle of Mogaung was a series of engagements that was fought in the Burma Campaign of World War II between 6 and 26 June 1944 at the Burmese town of Mogaung. In brutal fighting, the 77th 'Chindit' Brigade under Brigadier Michael Calvert, later assisted by Chinese forces of Generalissimo Chiang Kai-shek, fought for and captured the town from the occupying forces of Imperial Japan.

The battle was part of the second Chindit campaign, Operation Thursday. This later became part of the Siege of Myitkyina by Chinese and US forces led by Joseph Stilwell who was in overall command of the Chindits. The capture of Mogaung was the first place in Burma to be liberated from the Japanese, and it was the last major Chindit campaign of the war. Two Victoria Crosses were awarded during the battle.

== Background ==
In 1943, Brigadier Orde Wingate led the Chindits behind Japanese lines for the first of their long-range penetration operations with Operation Longcloth. It resulted in little strategic success, but it did prove that British Empire forces could fight on equal terms with the Japanese in the jungle. The following year, General William 'Bill' Slim, leading the British Fourteenth Army, was engaged in a desperate struggle against the Japanese army, which had launched Operation U-Go – the invasion of British India beginning in March 1944.

As a result of the Japanese invasion, a second Chindit expedition was launched; Operation Thursday was much larger than the previous years, with six brigades. The aim was to harass the Japanese rear and supply lines, as well as to relieve pressure on American General "Vinegar Joe" Stilwell's joint Chinese and US forces moving south into Northern Burma, who were intending to take the strategic town of Myitkyina. The early operations of the Chindits were marred by the death of Wingate in an air crash. They then went under the command of Major General Walter Lentaigne but were eventually placed under the command of the Anglophobe Stilwell. By that time, the 77th Brigade had been in action since early March, having held off superior Japanese forces for two months from their stronghold of White City.

=== Prelude ===
In late May, the Chindits were ordered north by Stilwell to the Mogaung area to take the pressure off his Chinese forces, who were struggling to besiege Myitkyina. Capturing Mogaung meant that the Japanese lifeline northward would be cut and Myitkyina would inevitably fall. At the end of May, Fourteenth Army intelligence, backed by hazardous patrols from the 77th Brigade, found that the Japanese had reinforced the defenders of Mogaung with four battalions from Lieutenant-General Hisashi Takeda's 53rd Division, bringing the defenders to just under 4,000 troops. The 77th Brigade consisted of four battalions: 1st Battalion, the Lancashire Fusiliers; 1st Battalion, the King's Regiment; 1st Battalion, the South Staffordshire Regiment and 3rd Battalion, the 6th Gurkha Rifles. Accompanying the brigade were RAF liaison officers who would need high ground for radio contact from which to bring in close air support.

Getting to Mogaung would be difficult for the brigade. There was no way of flying in, and to the north of the town was the fast-flowing Mogaung River, and to the west, diverging off, was the Wetthauk Chaung River. The country to the east and south was interspersed with lakes and marshes, with the only access being a two-mile-long causeway to Pinhmi. The British would have to use this to reach Mogaung and would come up against villages on the outskirts that had been heavily fortified, with bunkers constructed beneath the buildings.

== Battle ==
On 30 May, the brigade set off; the plan was to advance 160 miles to the town using the Pinhmi road as an axis. Their priority was an area for a small landing strip to evacuate the sick and wounded, as well as for dropping supplies. Calvert had hoped to reach and even capture Mogaung by 5 June.

=== Lakum ===
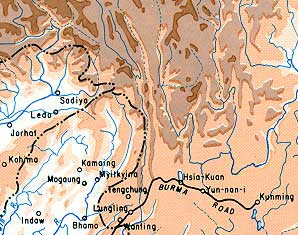
Location of Mogaung in Northern Burma

The march was difficult – thick jungle intersected by deep ravines and the occasional sporadic firefight with the Japanese. Nevertheless, on 2 June the South Staffordshire Regiment and the Gurkhas captured the village of Lakum after a fierce encounter with the Japanese. The village was a low-lying hill overlooking the plain, two miles south-west of Mogaung. On the following day, another series of bitter encounters forced the Japanese off the surrounding hills – the Gurkhas seized a hamlet, later dubbed 'Gurkha Village', after wiping out the forty-strong garrison there. They captured intact a large ammunition dump, fifteen lorries and a camouflaged hospital full of medical supplies, as well as many sick Japanese soldiers. Many of these tried to escape without success and many more committed suicide.

Calvert had his headquarters operational just south of Lakum, and a small airstrip was hastily laid from which supplies were arranged to be flown in and dropped by C-47s. The wounded and sick could be flown out by using Sentinel aircraft and even the new Sikorsky R-4 helicopters. An RAF liaison officer established a position to coordinate air support from the US 1st Air Commando Group for further combat sorties in the assault on Mogaung. Calvert also built up a store of medical, food, and military supplies before any major attack took place. At the same time, the local Kachin groups led by former Burma Rifles officers who had established control of the area joined Calvert's men to provide vital intelligence on Japanese movements. The following day two platoons of the Lancashire Fusiliers captured a vital point on the Mogaung river known as the Tapaw Ferry that would prove useful if the Chindits needed an escape route.

The villages of Mahaung, Natgyigon and the Pinhmi bridge on the outskirts of Mogaung were key positions in its defence; once these had fallen the Japanese hold on the town would become untenable. In Mogaung itself, the courthouse and railway station were potential areas for heavy resistance as they were the two main all-brick buildings. Over the next few days, the brigade was supplied with PIAT anti-tank weapons, flamethrowers, and 3-inch and 4.2-inch mortars, with thousands of rounds, as the only means of heavy fire support. Japanese artillery was causing casualties,s but Calvert was eventually able to call in P-51 Mustangs of 1st Air Commando in an attempt to silence the Japanese positions.

=== Pinhmi bridge and outskirts ===
The attack on the Pinhmi-to-Mogaung road, where the vital Pinhmi bridge crossed the Wetthauk Chaung river, began on June 7. As they advanced closer to Mogaung, the Staffordshires found and destroyed a Japanese ammunition dump, and the Lancashire Fusiliers later captured the village of Pinhmi. An attempt on the bridge the following day, however, failed as the Lancashires were repelled from concealed Japanese positions which ranged along a fifteen-foot-high embankment, incurring heavy casualties. Nevertheless, a reconnaissance patrol found a ford further down the river, and from this the Gurkhas and the Staffordshires attacked and secured the village of Mahaung. In addition, they secured the village of Ywathitgale, destroyed a Japanese administrative headquarters, and reached the Pinhmi–Mogaung road, outflanking several Japanese positions. They then launched several counterattacks but were driven off. On June 10, the Gurkhas attempted to take the bridge again; the first attempt failed, but the second, in a wide flanking move, succeeded in taking the bridge. Among them was Captain Michael Allmand's heroic feat in ensuring the capture of the bridge. The attacks cost nearly 130 casualties, but Calvert's brigade was securely established along the axis of the Pinhmi-Mogaung road.

The monsoon then broke later that day, and conditions were tough for the men of the 77th Brigade; trench foot and typhus were soon rife. Calvert learnt that two more Japanese battalions arrived to reinforce Mogaung, essentially replacing casualties, and seeing the difficulty, he then sent a messenger to Stilwell to alert him to the situation; but was not received with any sympathy. Stilwell eventually sent the 1/114th Chinese Infantry Regiment from the 38th Division to support the Chindits. Calvert assessed the situation on June 12; many battalions were reduced to a company, which meant the brigade total consisted of no more than 750 fit men. Calvert was concerned with the number of wounded and the sick having to endure the poor conditions – slit trenches were impossible due to the wet conditions; men would have to lie face down in the mud if they were under shell fire. Many of the wounded, however, were determined to stay and fight rather than be flown out.

Over the next few days, conditions began to improve; many of the wounded were flown out, and supplies were brought in once more. On June 15 Calvert continued his attacks, fighting to secure a ridge closer to the town. The Court House was taken the next day, and the area extending to the Mogaung River and up to the outskirts of Natgyigon was cleared. Japanese mortar fire from the village of Naungkaiktaw was causing some grief upon the Chindits. At dawn on June 18, air attacks and a heavy mortar bombardment over the next few days followed by an assault by the Lancashire Fusiliers and the King's, using flamethrowers. At the cost of some fifty casualties (some from friendly fire) they succeeded and drove around a hundred Japanese out of the village in addition to killing some seventy of them. Whilst consolidating their position in the village, a Japanese patrol was ambushed and taken out; they had not realised the village had been in British hands.

Around the same time, Chinese troops began to arrive; Gurkhas made contact with them West of Lakum. Mogaung was then surrounded, with the Chinese in the south, which totalled nearly three battalions. Crucially, they had 75mm mountain guns stationed at Pinhmi, which pounded Japanese positions.

=== Mogaung ===
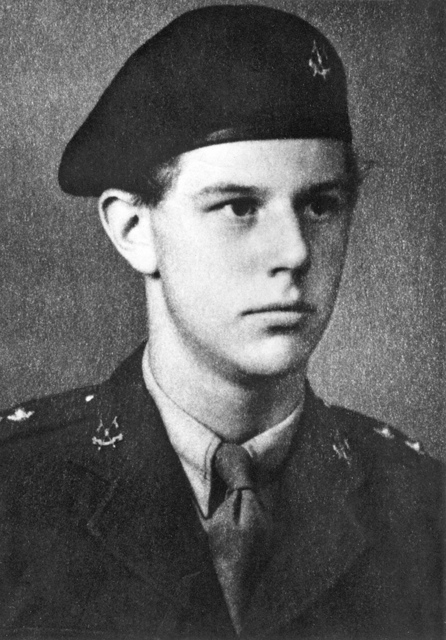
Gurkha Captain Michael Allmand who won the VC during the Battle of Mogaung

Calvert planned his next attack for 23 June towards Natyigon, a key position and the last outer bastion of Mogaung. At first light on that day, the final assault was launched; every available fit man was called up: cooks, orderlies and even Headquarters personnel. The Chinese attacked towards the railway station along the railway embankment, which was effectively a last line of defence. Despite a heavy bombardment, the attack failed, and the Chinese were held back with intense Japanese machine gun fire. The Chindits had no choice but to halt along this line for the remainder of the day.

Earlier reconnaissance had pinpointed the 'Red House', a large brick building. The following day, after a heavy bombardment from the Chinese guns and British mortars as well as air attacks, the British attacked from the North of the station. Once more, fighting was intense, the Japanese defending tenaciously despite the constant pounding. The building and surrounding positions were only taken after brutal fighting in which flamethrowers, grenades and PIATs were used. One of the men involved was Rifleman Tulbahadur Pun; his single-handed gallantry as part of the Gurkhas attack on the 'Red House' earned him a nomination for the Victoria Cross. The other nomination fell to Captain Michael Allmand, who attacked a machine-gun position holding up his remaining company. He knocked out the position with grenades but was mortally wounded in the process. The Chinese provided some fire support but did not take part in this attack, instead protecting the flanks and cutting off any Japanese escape attempt. The Gurkhas' assault completely disbalanced the Japanese, and Takeda had no choice but to withdraw or risk his battalions being destroyed.

The final attack was on the railway station on 25 June – the Chinese attack from the South was postponed, but the Lancashires and the South Staffordshires went in anyway and, after more heavy fighting, finally took the battered remains and met up with the Chinese. With the British maintaining a strong foothold in the town, the Japanese launched several counterattacks that night, but they were beaten off. The following morning Chindit and Chinese patrols found Japanese positions outside the town abandoned. Any Japanese who escaped did so using oil drums, hoping they would make it downriver to Myitkyina. Many, however, were shot up by patrolling Chindits.

With the battle largely over, the Chindits consolidated their position in Mogaung, but they were physically and mentally exhausted. The brigade at the end of the battle had fewer than 550 men left of fighting strength. The Lancashire Fusiliers, King's Regiment and South Staffordshires could only muster 300 between them, and the 3/6th Gurkhas had 230 left fit.

== Aftermath ==
Once Mogaung had been captured the Gurkhas garrisoned the town preparing for further counterattacks from across the river but none were forthcoming; the Japanese had left the area completely. Whilst in Mogaung, the Gurkhas took the opportunity to hold a small ceremonial parade and hoisted the Union Jack on a large pagoda, the most prominent building left standing. The Chindits remained in the area until July 5 and then withdrew to their base area at Pinhmi. They then had to march a further fifty miles to be flown back to India, leaving Mogaung in the hands of the Chinese.

Mogaung was the first place in Burma to be liberated from the Japanese, and it was the last major Chindit campaign of the war. The Japanese had lost heavily with nearly 1,600 casualties, most of whom were dead and an unknown number of sick that were evacuated. The cost of taking Mogaung had been high – Calvert had lost 47 officers and 729 other ranks killed or wounded; which equated to around fifty percent casualties. Stilwell had used the Chindits in an unsuitable role of classic infantry, without the support of artillery and armour. He announced via the BBC that Chinese troops of his Northern Combat Area Command had captured Mogaung but without referring to the British. The Chindits were outraged, and Calvert famously signalled to Stilwell's headquarters 'Chinese reported taking Mogaung. My Brigade now taking umbrage.' Stillwell's son who was the intelligence officer announced that 'Umbrage was so small that I can't find it on the map'. The Chinese New First Army had suffered 1,428 killed, 3,163 wounded, and 50 missing in the battle of Mogaung Valley from March 31 to July 15, 1944.

Fearing that they would then be ordered to join the siege of Myitkyina, Calvert shut down his radios and withdrew to Kamaing, where Stilwell had his headquarters. A court-martial was likely until Stilwell and Calvert met in person, and the former finally appreciated the conditions under which the Chindits had been operating. The siege of Myitkyina had already proved a thorn in Stilwell's side after a major Chinese assault had been repelled with heavy losses. The British capture of Mogaung did relieve pressure on Stilwell's troops besieging the town; the Japanese quit Myitkyina on 3 August.

Two Victoria Crosses were awarded during the battle – Michael Allmand received his posthumously, while Tul Bahadur Pun received his in November. In addition members of the Sixth Gurkhas also received two DSOs, three IOMs, six MCs, four IDSMs, twelve MMs and three US Silver Stars. The South Staffordshires, Kings and Lancashire Fusiliers also received many awards. Calvert was awarded the DSO and Bar and the American Silver Star for the capture of Mogaung. He was evacuated to Britain on medical grounds following an accidental injury in September 1944. In March 1945 he was appointed to command the Special Air Service Brigade taking command of various operations in the Western Allied invasion of Germany devising Operation Amherst. He held this appointment until the brigade disbanded in October 1945.

== Bibliography ==
- Allen, Louis (1998). Burma: The Longest War, 1941–45. London: Phoenix Giant. ISBN 075380221X.
- Bidwell, Shelford (1980). The Chindit War: Stilwell, Wingate, and the Campaign in Burma, 1944. Macmillan. ISBN 978-0025106000.
- Brown, Ashley; Reed, Jonathan (1989). The Airborne The Elite Series. National Historical Society. ISBN 978-0918678492.
- Calvert, Michael (2004). Prisoners Of Hope. Pen and Sword. ISBN 978-0850524925.
- Corrigan, Gordon (2010). The Second World War: A Military History. Atlantic Books Ltd. ISBN 978-0857891358.
- Diamond, Jon (2016). Burma Road 1943–44: Stilwell's assault on Myitkyina. Bloomsbury Publishing. ISBN 978-1472811264.
- Fay, Peter W. (1993). The Forgotten Army: India's Armed Struggle for Independence, 1942–1945. Ann Arbor: University of Michigan Press. ISBN 0472083422.
- Gibbs, Herbert Ronald K; Ryan, D.G.J (1955). Historical Record of the 6th Gurkha Rifles, Volume 2. Gale & Polden. p. 141.
- Griffin, Paul (2018). The Lost Battalion. Lulu.com. ISBN 978-0244726362.
- Ladd, James D (1986). SAS Operations. Hale. ISBN 978-0709023722.
- Lunt, James (1994). Jai Sixth!: 6th Queen Elizabeth's own Gurkha Rifles 1817–1994. Pen and Sword. ISBN 978-1473815605.
- McLynn, Frank (2011). The Burma Campaign: Disaster into Triumph 1942–45. Random House. ISBN 978-1446449318.
- Rooney, David (1990). Mad Mike: Biography of Brigadier Michael Calvert. Pen and Sword. ISBN 978-0850525434.
- Rooney, David (1992). Burma Victory: Imphal and Kohima March 1944 to May 1945. Cassell. ISBN 0304354570.
- Smith, Robert Barr (1994). To the Last Cartridge. Avon Books. ISBN 978-0380772124.
- Towill, Bill (2000). A Chindit's Chronicle. iUniverse. ISBN 978-0595158324.
