= Mong Hkun =

Mong Hkun မိုင်းခွန်း Maingkwan, Möng Hkawn, Mont Hkawn (မုံ့ခေါင်မ်)
- Village
- Location in Burma
- Coordinates: 26°19′06″N 96°35′32″E
- Country: Burma
- Region: Kachin State
- District: Tanai District
- Township: Tanai Township
- Time zone: UTC+6.30 (MST)

Mong Hkun is a village in the Hukawng Valley of north-western Kachin State, Myanmar. The village is known for its nearby Burmite amber mines. It is also called Möng Hkawn in Shan, and it had a significant Shan population and a Saopha (Sawbwa) in the 1800s.
