= Francis Festing =

British Field Marshal (1902–1976)

Field Marshal Sir Francis Festing GCB KBE DSO DL
- Festing in 1958
- Born: 28 August 1902; Dublin, Ireland
- Died: 3 August 1976 (aged 73); Hexham, Northumberland, England
- Military career
- Allegiance: United Kingdom
- Branch: British Army
- Service years: 1921–1961
- Rank: Field Marshal
- Nicknames: "Frontline Frankie" "Frankie"
- Service number: 611
- Unit: Rifle Brigade (The Prince Consort's Own)
- Commands: Chief of the Imperial General Staff (1958–1961); Far East Land Forces (1956–1958); Eastern Command (1954–1956); British Troops in Egypt (1952–1954); Regular Commissions Board (1950–1951); British Forces in Hong Kong (1945–1946, 1949); 36th Infantry Division (1942–1945); 29th Infantry Brigade (1941); 2nd Battalion East Lancashire Regiment (1940–1941)
- Conflicts: Second World War
- Awards: Knight Grand Cross of the Order of the Bath; Knight Commander of the Order of the British Empire; Companion of the Distinguished Service Order; Mentioned in Despatches; Commander of the Legion of Merit (United States); Order of the Cloud and Banner (China)

Field Marshal Sir Francis Wogan Festing, GCB, KBE, DSO, DL (Mandarin: 菲士廷, fēi shì tíng; 28 August 1902 – 3 August 1976) was a senior British Army officer. His most important posts were as Commander of British Forces in Hong Kong (1945–46 and 1949), general officer commanding (GOC) British Troops in Egypt (1952), GOC Eastern Command (1954), Commander-in-Chief Far East Land Forces (1956), and Chief of the Imperial General Staff (1958–61). He saw active service in the Second World War, taking a prominent role in Operation Ironclad (the Battle of Madagascar) and the Arakan offensive of the Burma campaign, and later advised the British government on ending conscription and reducing the size of the army by fifteen battalions.

== Early life and military career ==
Festing was born in Dublin, Ireland, the son of Brigadier General Francis Leycester Festing and Charlotte Katherine Grindall Festing (née Festing). He was educated at Winchester College and the Royal Military College, Sandhurst, Festing was commissioned into 3rd Battalion the Rifle Brigade on 23 December 1921. He was promoted to lieutenant on 23 December 1923 and, after being seconded for service on the staff in July 1926, became aide-de-camp to Major General Sir John Burnett-Stuart, a former Rifle Brigade officer who had just taken command of the 3rd Division.

He relinquished this appointment in May 1930 and went on to be Air Liaison Officer for Eastern Command on 1 February 1936 and, after attending the Staff College, Camberley from 1933 to 1934, and having been promoted to captain on 1 September 1936, joined the staff at the War Office on 15 February 1938 before being promoted to major on 23 December 1938. In February 1939 he returned to the Staff College, Camberley, this time to serve as an instructor, a post he held until December 1939, three months after the Second World War began.

== Second World War ==
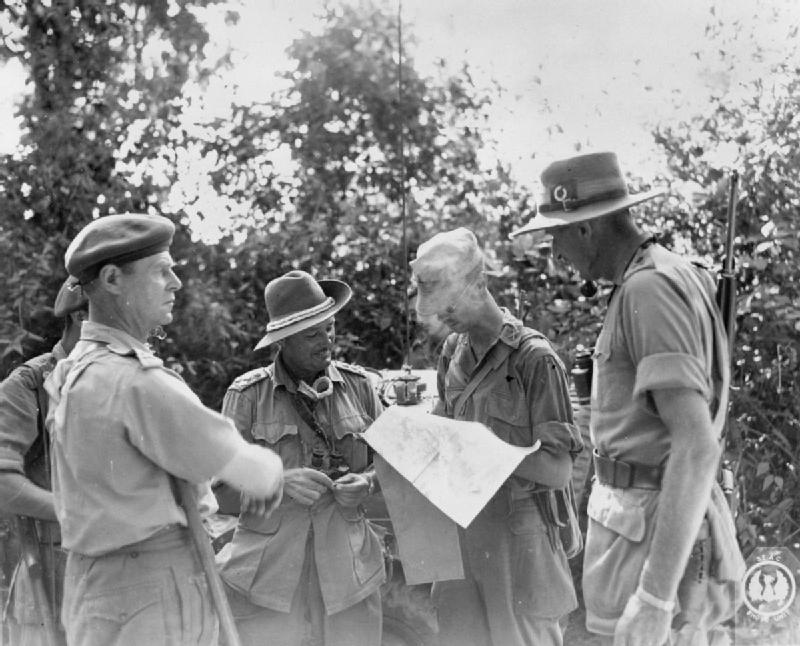
Major General Festing and Major General Collin Jardine in North Burma, December 1944.

In the Second World War Festing was air liaison officer for the expedition to Norway of 1940, then, having been promoted to acting lieutenant colonel in April 1940, as a staff officer in the Operations Directorate at the War Office from May 1940. In September 1940 he became commanding officer of the 2nd Battalion East Lancashire Regiment and then in April 1942 he became Commander of 29th Independent Infantry Brigade Group which was the landing force of Force 121 for Operation Ironclad, the seizure of Vichy French ports and airfields in the Indian Ocean, notably Diego Suárez, Majunga and Tamatave in Madagascar. He was appointed a Companion of the Distinguished Service Order (DSO) for his services in this campaign.

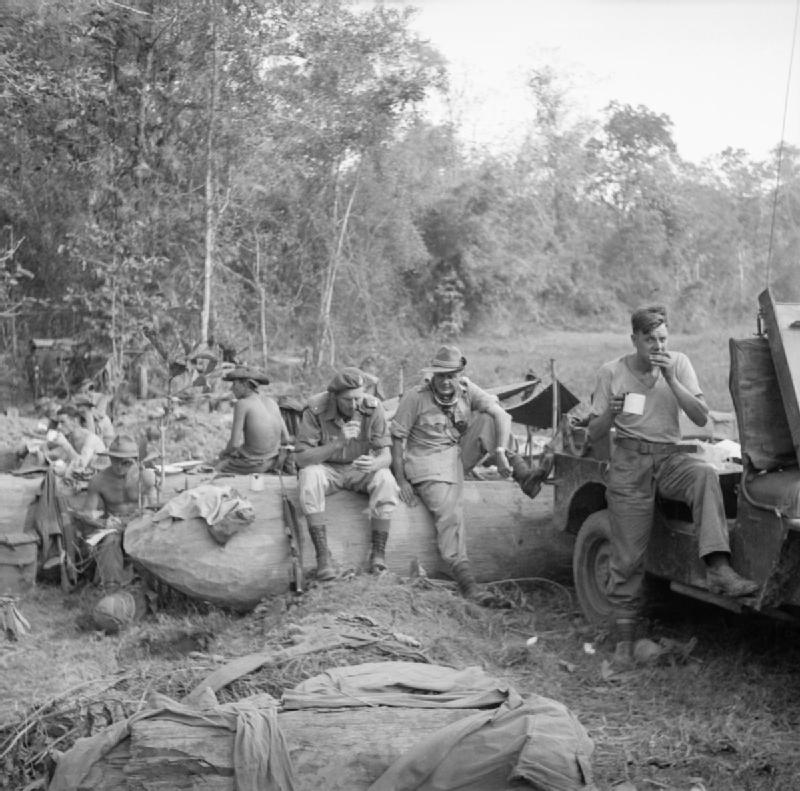
Major General Francis Festing, Commander of the 36th Infantry Division, with Brigadier Aslett and men of the 9th Battalion, Royal Sussex Regiment during a break in the advance to Mandalay, January 1945.

In November 1942 Festing took command of the 36th Indian Division and at the beginning of 1944 led it in the final stages of the third Arakan offensive of the Burma campaign. In mid-1944 the division moved to Northern Burma as part of the US led Northern Combat Area Command before rejoining 14th Army. Festing had a reputation as a front line soldier as illustrated by one quote of an event on 29 October 1944:

Myitkyina – To the growing Festing legend was added another dramatic chapter this week-end when Major General Francis Wogan Festing personally led the advance platoon of the 36th British Division into Mawlu. The leader of the platoon was killed, leaving the unit in charge of a sergeant. Festing, who is generally at the front, took over, and, probably the highest ranking officer ever to command a platoon, led it into Mawlu.

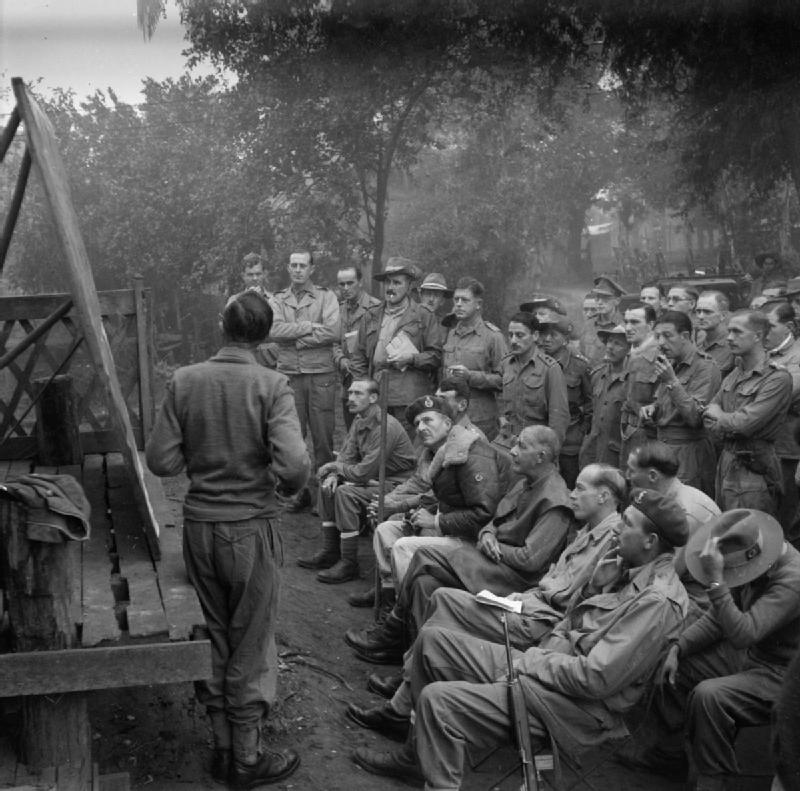
Major General F. W. Festing, GOC of the 36th Infantry Division (seated in centre of front row), with other senior officers at a briefing, January 1945.

Festing was mentioned in despatches on 5 April 1945, appointed a Commander of the Order of the British Empire on 5 July, and appointed a Companion of the Order of the Bath on 6 June 1946; all in recognition of his services in Burma. He was also awarded the Legion of Merit in the Degree of Commander by the President of the United States for his conduct throughout the war on 8 November 1945.

== Postwar career ==
Festing was appointed Commander of British Forces in Hong Kong from August 1945 and, then having been promoted to major general on 17 August 1946, he returned to the UK to be Director of Weapons and Development at the War Office in February 1947 where he remained until 26 June 1949 and then returned to Hong Kong. After recovering from a blood clot on the brain, he was appointed President of the Regular Commissions Board on 1 October 1950 and became Assistant Chief of Staff (Organisation and Training) at Supreme Headquarters Allied Powers in Europe on 1 April 1951. He took part in the funeral procession on 11 February 1952 following the death of King George VI and was appointed a Knight Commander of the Order of the British Empire in the Queen's Birthday Honours 1952.

Promoted to lieutenant general on 6 February 1952, Festing became general officer commanding British Troops in Egypt in April 1952 and then General Officer Commanding Eastern Command on 1 July 1954 and, having been advanced to Knight Commander of the Order of the Bath in the New Year Honours 1956, he became Commander-in-Chief Far East Land Forces in August 1956. Promoted to general on 29 November 1956, advanced to Knight Grand Cross of the Order of the Bath in the Queen's Birthday Honours 1957 and, having been appointed aide-de-camp general to the Queen on 26 June 1958, he became Chief of the Imperial General Staff on 29 September 1958. In this capacity he advised the British Government on ending conscription and reducing the size of the army by fifteen battalions. Having been promoted to field marshal on 1 September 1960, he retired on 1 November 1961.

Festing was also Honorary Colonel of the 50th (Northumberland) Machine Gun Battalion of the Royal Northumberland Fusiliers from 1 February 1948, Colonel Commandant of the Royal Northumberland Fusiliers from 12 March 1953, Colonel Commandant of the 3rd Green Jackets, The Rifle Brigade from 7 November 1958 and Colonel Commandant of the 3rd Battalion The Royal Green Jackets from 15 June 1968.

In retirement Festing became a Deputy Lieutenant of Northumberland. His interests included early firearms and Japanese swords. He was a practising Roman Catholic. He died at his home at Tarset near Hexham in Northumberland on 3 August 1976.

== Family ==
In 1937, Festing married Mary Cecilia (née Riddell, elder daughter of Cuthbert David Giffard Riddell, of Swinburne Castle, Northumberland), from an old recusant family. The couple had four sons: Fra' Matthew Festing (former Prince and Grand Master of the Sovereign Military Order of Malta), John Festing (former High Sheriff of Northumberland), Major Michael Festing and Andrew Festing (former President of the Royal Society of Portrait Painters).

== Bibliography ==
- Foster, Geoffrey (1946). 36th Division – North Burma – 1944–45. privately published.
- Heathcote, Tony (1999). The British Field Marshals 1736–1997. Barnsley (UK): Pen & Sword. ISBN 0-85052-696-5.
- Wilkes, Lyall (1991). Festing – Field Marshal: A study of "Front Line Frankie", G.C.B., K.B.E., D.S.O. Book Guild Ltd. ISBN 0-86332-532-7.
- Mead, Richard (2007). Churchill's Lions: a biographical guide to the key British generals of World War II. Stroud (UK): Spellmount. ISBN 978-1-86227-431-0.
- Smart, Nick (2005). Biographical Dictionary of British Generals of the Second World War. Barnesley: Pen & Sword. ISBN 1844150496.
- Shaigiya-Abdelsamad, Yahya (2013). Britain & Japan Biographical Portraits, Field Marshal Sir Francis Festing (1912-1976). Global Oriental.

Military offices
Preceded by Christopher Maltby	Commander of British Forces in Hong Kong; 1945–1946	Succeeded by Sir George Erskine
Preceded by Francis Matthews	Commander of British Forces in Hong Kong; June – September 1949	Succeeded by Sir Robert Mansergh
Preceded by Sir George Erskine	GOC British Troops in Egypt; 1952–1954	Succeeded by Sir Richard Hull
Preceded by Sir Geoffrey Bourne	GOC-in-C Eastern Command; 1954–1956	Succeeded by Sir Charles Coleman
Preceded by Sir Charles Loewen	C-in-C Far East Land Forces; 1956–1958	Succeeded by Sir Richard Hull
Preceded by Sir Gerald Templer	Chief of the Imperial General Staff; 1958–1961	Succeeded by Sir Richard Hull
Honorary titles
Preceded by Harold Morgan	Colonel of the Royal Northumberland Fusiliers; 1953–1965	Succeeded by Roger St John
