= Kamaing =

Kamaing ကာမိုင်းမြို့
- Location in Burma
- Coordinates: 25°31′21″N 96°42′41″E
- Country: Myanmar
- Division: Kachin State
- District: Myitkyina District
- Township: Hpakant Township

Population (2005)
  - Religions: Christian Buddhist
- Time zone: UTC+6.30 (MST)

Kamaing (Burmese: ကာမိုင်းမြို့; also Kamine) is a jade-mining town in the Kachin State of the northernmost part of Myanmar.

== People ==
It is the birthplace of journalist Edward Michael Law-Yone.
