= Northern Combat Area Command =

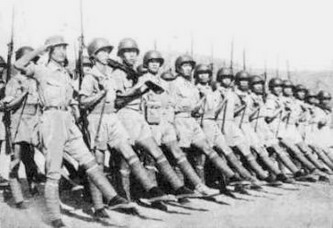
- US equipped Chinese Army marching in Ramgarh, India
- Active: 1942–1945
- Country: (Republic of China (1912–1949)) Republic of China; United States
- Branch: (Republic of China (1912–1949)) National Revolutionary Army; United States Army
- Type: Regional Command
- Nickname: "NCAC"

Commanders
- Notable commanders: Joseph "Vinegar Joe" Stilwell; Daniel Sultan; Sun Li-jen

The Northern Combat Area Command (NCAC) was a subcommand of the Allied South East Asia Command (SEAC) during World War II. It controlled Allied ground operations in northern Burma. For most of its existence, NCAC was commanded by United States Army General Joseph "Vinegar Joe" Stilwell (who concurrently held more senior command positions). In 1945 after Stilwell was recalled, his deputy, Lieutenant General Daniel Sultan, was promoted to and assumed command.

Chinese Nationalist National Revolutionary Army personnel constituted most of the combat units within NCAC.

While it was initially intended that NCAC would operate as an integral part of the British 11th Army Group, Stilwell refused to work under General George Giffard and was made subordinate to the Supreme Commander of SEAC, Lord Louis Mountbatten.

== Composition ==
In 1942, Northern Combat Area Command was formed at Ramgarh Cantonment, in India, from X Force: units (including the 22nd and 38th Divisions), which had retreated out of Burma. After its arrival in India, X Force was reinforced – eventually becoming the New 1st Army – a corps-level formation. It was re-equipped at British expense and re-trained by US Army instructors.

For the campaigning season of early 1944, NCAC was augmented with Merrill's Marauders – a brigade-sized formation created by the US Army for commando -type operations in Burma. During 1944, NCAC forced the Japanese 18th Division to retreat out of northern Burma and US Army engineering battalions, assisted by Indian laborers built the Ledo Road – which joined the northern end of the Burma Road and reestablished communications between India and China. Towards the end of 1944, NCAC was reinforced by the British 36th Infantry Division.

In 1945, under Sultan's command, NCAC – which now included the Chinese New 6th Army – aided in the drive to retake the rest of Burma.

== Campaigns ==
The main combat power of NCAC, at least in terms of numbers, were its Chinese divisions. When British and Chinese forces had been forced out of Burma at the start of 1942, some Chinese forces had been obliged to retreat to India, rather than to China. It was from these formations that NCAC was created.

Many times during World War II, British and American commanders in India were frustrated by their Chinese allies. A combination of fickleness and over-centralisation by the Chinese generalissimo, Chiang Kai-shek and the limited training of the Chinese forces meant that they often failed to live up to their potential. However, the Chinese forces in NCAC were considerably better than their contemporaries in China itself. Greater access to American equipment and training and less influence from the Chinese leadership meant the four Chinese divisions in NCAC could be trusted a great deal more in combat.

However, it was not only from NCAC's divisions that trouble sprang. Its first commander was an extremely controversial character. Stilwell had first been posted to China as Chief of Staff to Chiang Kai-shek. However, as the campaign in Burma developed, he also took on a role there. The US Army established the China Burma India Theater (CBI Theater), and placed Stilwell in command. The CBI Theater was not supposed to be an operational headquarters: it was merely supposed to be in charge of the administration of the American military formations in China, Burma and India. However, Stilwell often broke the chain of command and communicated directly with the Joint Chiefs of Staff on operational matters, when all such communications were supposed to go to Admiral Lord Mountbatten the Supreme Allied Commander, South East Asia and also on taking operational control of NCAC through General George Giffard commander of 11th Army Group.

The initial idea was that as General Stilwell would be commanding several Chinese divisions which would attack out of India from the West and with the large but amorphous Yunnan armies attacking out of China from the East, he would be commanding a large army. So his command should be placed under 11th Army Group at the same level as the Fourteenth which was under the command of General William Slim. The attacks could then be coordinated at Army Group level.

Stilwell, however bitterly resisted [being under Giffard's command]. To watch Stilwell, when hard pressed, shift his opposition from one of the several strong-points he held by virtue of his numerous Allied, American and Chinese offices, to another was a lesson in mobile offensive-defence.

— William Slim.

At a meeting to sort out the operational chain of command for the three fronts in Burma, Stilwell astonished everyone by saying "I am prepared to come under General Slim's operational control until I get to Kamaing". Rather than sack him, Mountbatten reluctantly agreed to this, but it was a dangerous compromise. It created a complicated chain of command where Slim theoretically had to report to two different commanders: Giffard for Fourteenth Army actions, and Mountbatten for Stilwell's formations. Under a general less gifted than Slim this could have caused serious problems, if Slim had not been able to command Stilwell at an operational level without disagreement (which given Stilwell's proven record was more than likely). But at an operational level Slim was able to work with Stilwell and "this illogical command set-up worked surprisingly well".

The reason why it was essential that there was one operational commander for the three fronts, North, Central and Southern, was so that the intended attacks in late 1944 could be coordinated to prevent the Japanese concentrating large numbers of reserves for a counterattack on any one front.

Stilwell thus had four different jobs to perform, which required him to be in different places at once. For example, as Chief of Staff to Chiang, he was often needed in Chongqing, the Chinese capital, and as Deputy Allied Supreme Commander he was needed at HQ South East Asia Command at Kandy in Ceylon and as NCAC commander he was required to be relatively near the frontline in Burma. His personality also caused problems. Stilwell clashed frequently with the commander of the 11th Army Group, General Giffard, and would not accept being under his command, instead insisting that NCAC came directly under the Supreme Commander. As Deputy Allied Supreme Commander he was Giffard's superior but as operational commander of NCAC Giffard was his superior. As the two men did not get on this inevitably led to conflict and confusion.

NCAC's first months were frustrating, as the time was for all Allied formations in the theater. Its first real success did not come until the 1943-44 campaigning season. The Chindits had been dropped behind enemy lines after the end of the 1943 monsoon to cause havoc by cutting communications. This they did, but the original operational plan failed for a number of reasons. In the end, they were sent northwards into NCAC's area of operations.

At the time, NCAC's main job was to capture the town of Myitkyina, as a prelude to connecting the Ledo Road to the Burma Road and reestablishing land communications to China. During the offensive, NCAC intelligence staff serving under General Stilwell repeatedly underestimated Japanese troop strength in Burma. A thrust from the northwest by NCAC was meeting with some success, but Stilwell also needed to use the Chindits in his plan. However, he not only used them but misused them. The Chindits were designed as a light raiding force, not as conventional infantry. They had negligible artillery support and were much smaller in number than equivalent conventional formations. However, Stilwell insisted on using them as conventional infantry. He assigned them the task of capturing Mogaung south of Myitkyina, which was strongly held by the Japanese. The Chindits succeeded in their task but suffered horrendous casualties. Even then Stilwell was not finished. He demanded still further miracles from the Chindits and their commander Brigadier Lentaigne. Reduced to the equivalent of less than a battalion, the Chindits assisted in the final assault on Myitkyina before finally being flown out to India as a completely broken force. The American equivalent of the Chindits, Merrill's Marauders also suffered from the same treatment during the campaign, consistently being asked to perform missions that were beyond their power without superhuman effort.

After the fall of Myitkyina, only a small area of Japanese territory separated NCAC from the Chinese forces. As the 1944 monsoon ended, NCAC opened an offensive. It had been reinforced with the British 36th Infantry Division, which gave it a considerably increased punch. However, the Japanese 33rd Army under General Masaki Honda performed a very creditable delaying action against the forces attacking them. The Japanese were outnumbered several times but still managed to hold the Chinese forces at bay for several months. In the end, it was events on the main front further south that forced them to withdraw, as they were in danger of being cut off from their supply lines. 36th Division was used to support the left wing of the Fourteenth Army under Lieutenant General William Slim.

In October 1944, due to personal disagreements with Chiang, Stilwell was recalled to the United States by President Roosevelt. His former role was split as was the CBI Theater:

- Lieutenant General Raymond Wheeler became Deputy Supreme Allied Commander South East Asia.
- Major General Albert Wedemeyer became Chief of Staff to Chiang Kai-shek and commander of the U.S. Forces, China Theater (USFCT).
- Lieutenant General Daniel Isom Sultan was promoted from deputy commander of CBI to become commander of the U.S. Forces, India-Burma Theater (USFIBT) and commander of the NCAC.

His replacements were not only less abrasive characters but as they each concentrated on one area there was less institutional conflict and confusion.

NCAC's main role in the last few months of the war was to support the British main offensive further south and to further improve the Burma Road to allow more supplies to get into China.

After the war, NCAC was quickly disbanded. It had achieved its objectives, but the route to those objectives was strewn with command problems and missed opportunities.

Among attached United States Army Air Forces units was the 5th Liaison Squadron (August 1944).

== See also ==
- South-East Asian Theatre
- Japanese conquest of Burma
