= Indaw =

Indaw ဝဵင်းဢၢင်းတေႃႇ အင်းတော
- Town
- Location of Indaw, Myanmar
- Coordinates: 24°13′17″N 96°08′36″E
- Country: Myanmar
- Region: Sagaing Region
- District: Katha
- Township: Indaw

Area
  - Total: 0.292 sq mi (0.76 km^{2})
- Elevation: 387 ft (118 m)

Population (2019)
  - Total: 10,706
  - Density: 36,700/sq mi (14,200/km^{2})
- Time zone: UTC+6.30 (MMT)

Indaw (Shan: ဝဵင်းဢၢင်းတေႃႇ, Burmese: အင်းတော) is a town in northern Myanmar and is the principal town of Indaw Township, Katha District, Sagaing Region. It is located 1 mile (1.6 km) south-east of Indaw Lake. The rail junction at Naba is located about 3 miles (4.8 km) to the north-east of the town.

== History ==
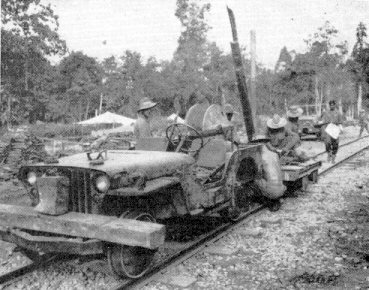
Rail Jeep strings signal wire on Pinwe to Naba Junction railroad in Burma on December 15, 1944

In 1944 during World War II, a major campaign was fought in Indaw between Japanese and British forces. The Japanese had two airfields at Indaw, the Indaw West strip and the Indaw Lake strip.

On 7 April 2025, a combined force of the Kachin Independence Army, People's Defense Force, and ABSDF captured the town from the State Administration Council junta.
