= Yang Ruifu =

Chinese military officer

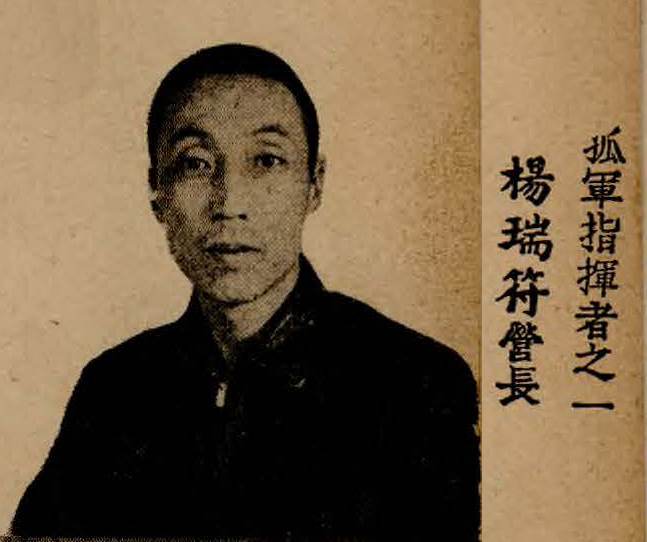

Yang Ruifu (traditional Chinese: 楊瑞符; simplified Chinese: 杨瑞符; pinyin: Yáng Ruìfú; Wade–Giles: Yang Jui-fu;, courtesy name Jieqing (節卿); 1902 - 3 February 1940), was a Chinese military officer of the 524th Regiment, 88th Division who, along with Xie Jinyuan commanded the Defense of Sihang Warehouse during the 1937 Battle of Shanghai.

== Biography ==
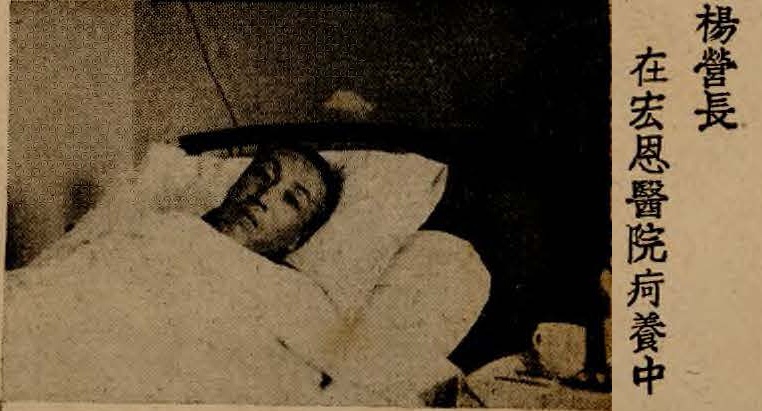
Yang recovering in a hospital

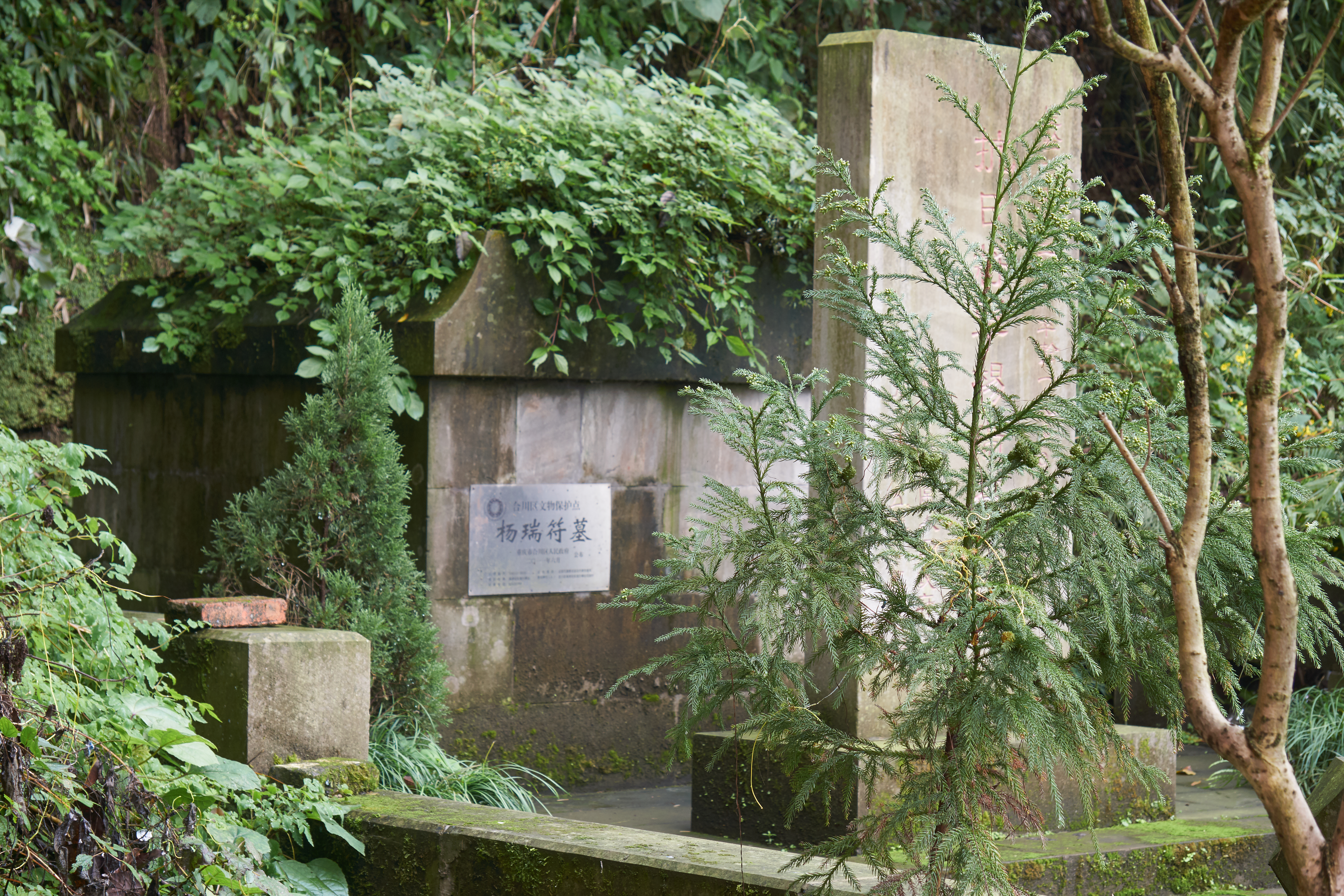
Yang's grave

Born in 1902 in Jinghai County, Tianjin, he joined the National Revolutionary Army in 1921 and was eventually assigned to the 524th Regiment of the 88th Division. He rose through the ranks from squad, platoon, company to regimental commander. One of the leaders of the Defense of Sihang Warehouse, he later left Shanghai and rejoined the Chinese war effort. In May 1939 he moved with his family to Hechuan, Chongqing to recover, but died of a wound infection in early 1940. He was posthumously promoted to the rank of brigadier general. He was considered as one of the most prominent figures during the Battle of Shanghai.
