= 88th Division (National Revolutionary Army) =

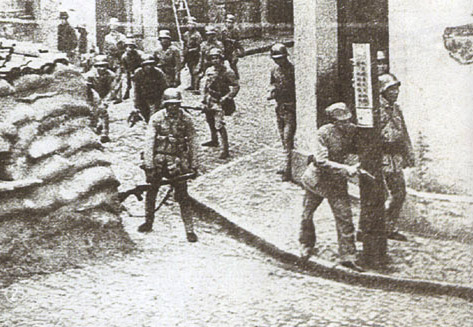
- The 88th Division fighting during the 1937 Battle of Shanghai.
- Active: 1932–1949
- Country: Republic of China
- Branch: (Republic of China (1912–1949)) National Revolutionary Army
- Type: Infantry
- Size: 14,000
- Nicknames: Tiger Division; Steel Division; Chiang's Fist
- Patron: Alexander von Falkenhausen
- Colors: Blue and White
- Engagements: January 28 incident Second Sino-Japanese War: Battle of Shanghai; Battle of Nanjing; Battle of Lanfeng; Battle of Wuhan; Battle of Fujin Mountain; Battle of South Shanxi (1940); Battle of Northern Burma and Western Yunnan; Chinese Civil War: Battle of Siping; Battle of Benxi; Siping Campaign; Battle of Jinzhou; Guangxi Campaign
- Decorations: Presidential Unit Citation; Flying Tiger Flag

Commanders
- Ceremonial chief: Chiang Kai-shek
- Notable commanders: Sun Yuanliang; Yu Jishi; Xie Jinyuan

Insignia
- Divisional Arm badge

The 88th Division (traditional Chinese: 第八十八師; simplified Chinese: 第八十八师; pinyin: Dì Bāshíbā Shī; Wade–Giles: Ti Pa-shih-pa Shih) was one of the eight fully German-trained and reorganized elite infantry division units in the Chinese National Revolutionary Army (NRA).

== Early history ==
In 1927, the Kuomintang purged its leftist members, dissolved the First United Front, and completely eliminated Soviet influence from its ranks. Chiang Kai-shek turned to Germany, historically a great military power, for assistance in the reorganization of the National Revolutionary Army (NRA). The Weimar Republic sent advisors to China, however due to restrictions imposed by the Treaty of Versailles, these advisors could not serve in military capacities.

When Adolf Hitler became Chancellor in 1933 and disregarded the Treaty of Versailles, the Nazi Party and the KMT, united by their shared anti-communist ideals began closely cooperating, with Germany training Chinese troops and expanding Chinese infrastructure while China made its markets and natural resources available to Germany. In 1934, Hans von Seeckt, acting as advisor to Chiang, proposed a "60 Division Plan" for restructuring the NRA into 60 divisions of highly trained, well-equipped troops based on German doctrine. The 88th Division was one of the first divisions to be reorganized and, alongside the 36th Division and 87th Division became the most elite units of the NRA.

Before receiving German training, the 88th Division was present at the 1932 January 28 incident in Shanghai under the command of Yu Jishi as part of the 5th Army, fighting alongside the 19th Route Army.

=== Order of Battle (1932) ===
- 5th Army - Zhang Zhizhong
  - 88th Division - Yu Jishi

  - 262nd Brigade - Qian Lunti
  - 264th Brigade - Yang Bufei (楊步飛)

== Second Sino-Japanese War ==
In 1937, though still not completely trained and fully equipped with German weapons, the 88th Division under the command of Sun Yuanliang was rushed to the Battle of Shanghai alongside the other German-trained divisions. These divisions performed well, pushing the Japanese Special Naval Landing Force (SNLF) back to the very shores of Shanghai. By September 8, the 88th division had suffered 1,430 killed or wounded out of the nearly 11,500 troops of the division, with plans to supplement the unit with 769 troops from a Zhejiang peace preservation regiment, though an earlier report put the unit's losses by September 5 at approximately 2,210 casualties. After the landing of the Shanghai Expeditionary Army on August 23, the 88th Division was in a stand-off with the SNLF in the urban city of Shanghai for most of September with little fighting. The division was bombarded by artillery and aircraft followed by assaults from the SNLF between 1 October and 8 October. On October 15, the division launched a large-scale raid with the 2nd Battalion of the 528th Regiment organized into five assault groups. They were able to break into SNLF positions at Qiujiang Road (虯江路) and Guangdong Street (廣東街) with the support of artillery, but could not make any further progress and eventually returned to their starting positions.

While the Chinese Air Force provided much air-interdiction and close-air support early-on in the battle of Shanghai, pressing demands for air force units in the northern front at the Battle of Taiyuan and southern front, plus heavy attrition in the Shanghai-Nanjing theater of operations eventually overwhelmed the Chinese Air Force units, the eventual absence of air and naval support, poor coordination between units, and the lack of defence in depth, resulted in the division suffering heavy casualties towards the end of the three-month battle. On October 26, most of the division withdrew from Zhabei, with some 400 soldiers of the 524th Regiment staying behind to defend Sihang Warehouse, near the Shanghai International Settlement, in an attempt to garner Western support for China in the Nine Power Treaty Conference.

On October 30, the division finished its withdrawal to the east side of the Suzhou River. On October 31, the 88th Division, the Tax Police Corps, and a portion of the 36th Division fought against the enemy attempting to cross the river. The overextended Tax Police Corps was unable to repel the enemy at Liujiazhai (劉家宅) and the 88th Division had to extend its line to the Zhoujiaqiao Town (周家橋鎮). By November 3, the 88th Division reported that they had cleared all enemy troops crossing the river near Zhoujiaqiao and confirmed the enemy they were facing was the 68th Infantry Regiment of the 3rd Division.

On 5 November, the Japanese Tenth Army landed at Jinshanwei (金山衛). The whole Chinese army began its process on evacuating from Shanghai. On November 9, the 36th and 88th Divisions finished their redeployment to the east bank of the Qingyang Port (青陽港). After cooperating with the Tax Police Corps to repel the enemy on November 14, the division withdrew to Nanjing.

After the Battle of Nanjing, the 88th Division never recovered its former strength and was of limited significance later in the war. In May 1938, the 88th Division participated in the Battle of Lanfeng and suffered more than 3,000 killed or wounded and more than 800 missing. Divisional commander Long Muhan was executed by a firing squad in Wuhan for retreating from Lanfeng without order. In September, the division participated in the battle of Wuhan as part of the 71st Corps of the Fifth Military Front. From September 2 until September 11, the 36th and 88th Divisions fought in the Battle of Fujin Mountain. The Japanese 13th Division facing them suffered 1,200 casualties including 300 killed in the battle, and half of its battalion commanders were killed or wounded. By the end of the battle, the 36th Division had only approximately 850 combat soldiers left and was withdrawn from the battlefield while the 88th Division suffered casualties exceeding half. Subsequently, the 88th division participated in the battle of Shawo (沙窩), and by early October the unit had only 1,430 combat soldiers left.

In April 1940, the division participated in the Battle of South Shanxi (1940) as part of the 71st Corps which was temporarily assigned to the First Military Front, fighting around the Gaoping area before withdrawing for reorganization in May. In 1942, the 88th Division was reorganized as part of the Chinese Expeditionary Force (in Burma). In early May during the Japanese invasion of Burma, the Japanese army successively occupied Wanding, Mangshi, Zhefang, and Longling in Yunnan, marching towards the Nu River (怒江) and could soon threaten Kunming, which would disrupt incoming supplies from the Allies. Therefore, Chiang Kai-shek personally called Song Xilian, commander of the 11th Group Army, and ordered him to block the enemy's advance. On May 5, the 36th Division clashed with the forward units of the Japanese 56th Division at Huitong Bridge (惠通橋). By 8 May, the 36th Division had successfully repelled the Japanese troops and stabilized the position at Huitong Bridge. The 87th and 88th Divisions and the 2nd Reserve Division of the 71st Corps soon arrived and assembled along the Nu River.

On May 4, Longling was occupied by Japan. Long Shengww, the sone of Yunnan warlord Long Yun, had three battalions consisting of 1,000 warlord soldiers in Tengchong. They abandoned the city on May 6 and Tengyue county magistrate Qiu Tianpei abandoned the city on May 8, leaving the remaining troops leaderless and causing them to withdraw north, leaving the gates of the city walls wide open with no troops inside days before the Japanese arrived. Thus, 292 Japanese soldiers occupied the undefended Tengchong without firing a single shot on May 10.

On May 12, Chiang Kai-shek ordered the 71st Corps to retake Tengchong, and Song Xilian planned for a general offensive on May 15. However, the Chinese army had underestimated the Japanese troops in front of them, believing they were only an advance force of 2,000 to 3,000 soldiers, and could not break through the Japanese defenses, suffering heavy casualties. On May 22, Chiang ordered the 36th and 88th Divisions and the 2nd Reserve Division to sweep the Japanese army west of Nu River and retake Longling and Tengchong within three days, threatening punishments on Song and the three divisional commanders if they failed. The next day, Chiang sent several more telegrams criticizing Song for his inability in retaking the cities. On May 28, the 264th Brigade of the 88th Division reported that they had killed a Japanese battalion commander and seized documents which showed the enemy facing them numbered approximately 15,000-20,000. Song immediately sent the documents to the Military High Command. On May 31, Chiang ordered a stop to the offensive and to withdraw the main force from the Nu River, leaving behind a portion for guerilla warfare.

In mid-July of 1942, the 2nd Reserve Division and parts of the 36th and 88th Divisions entered the areas around Tengchong and conducted active guerilla warfare. In response, the Japanese 56th Division launched an operation to mop-up the 2nd Reserve Division starting on September 14. To support the 2nd Reserve Division, the 71st Corps marched to the foot of the Gaoligong Mountains. Duan Sheng (段生)'s battalion of the 262nd Regiment of the 88th Division was ordered to reinforce two guerilla battalions from the 36th and 88th Divisions and blocked the enemy near Hongmushu (红木樹). Starting from October 1, the Japanese 113th Infantry Regiment launched multiple attacks on Chinese positions along the Nu River. On October 3, the Japanese broke through the positions of the guerilla battalion of the 36th Division and forced them to retreat, resulting in the encirclement of Duan's battalion. The battalion was also forced to retreat with heavy casualties and occupied a new defensive position at Datangzi (大塘子). The next day, the battalion retreated northward under pressure and lost contact with its 2nd Company. Corps commander Zhong Bin (鐘彬) ordered the battalion to construct fortifications on the high ground southwest of Gandan (干胆) and forbade any retreat. On October 6, after failing to make any progress at Gandan, the Japanese split into two groups and attacked Datangzi and Jiucheng Street (舊城街). Due to the hasty retreat of the two companies of the 6th Regiment of the 2nd Reserve Division defending Datangzi, the situation suddenly fell into chaos. Duan's battalion was able to take in only 6 company and platoon commanders and 49 soldiers and laborers from its three companies after retreating to Ganding Street (敢顶街). There, the battalion was joined by the retreating guerilla battalion of the 36th Division and reinforcements from another battalion of the 88th Division to guard their position.

After the failure to destroy the Chinese guerillas near Tengchong, the Japanese 56th Division planned to amass a large number of troops and launch a punitive operation to implement stable occupation and "suppress future enemy counterattack". Starting from February 11, 1943, various regiments of the Japanese division set out from their occupation zones and advanced to Chinese positions. On February 16, the Japanese 146th Infantry Regiment defeated the 1st Battalion of the 264th Regiment of the 88th Division at the top of the Gaoligong Mountains and near Datangzi, wiping out a company of troops and forcing the battalion to retreat. The 148th Infantry Regiment also defeated elements of the 2nd Reserve and 88th Divisions after a bitter battle at the Mamian Pass (馬面關). The 56th division continued destroying Chinese facilities and positions until February 28, when the commander believed that they had achieved their goal of destroying the enemy stronghold and ordered an end to the first phase of the punitive campaign.

In May 1944, the 88th Division participated in the Battle of Northern Burma and Western Yunnan as part of the Second Chinese Expeditionary Force. In June 1945, the 36th, 87th, 88th, and Honorary 1st Divisions were awarded the Flying Tiger Flag for the recapture of Longling.

=== Order of Battle (1937) ===
- 88th Division - Total strength: 14,000 men

- 2 infantry brigades

- 1 artillery company
- 1 light artillery company
- 1 signal company
- 1 SpcOps company
- 3 infantry battalions

- 3 infantry companies

- 3 infantry platoons

- 3 infantry squads

- 1 heavy weapons company

- directly under divisional command

- 1 artillery battalion

- 3 artillery companies

- 1 anti-tank company
- 1 anti-air company
- 1 engineer company
- 1 signal company

- 2 "wired" platoons
- 1 wireless platoon

- 1 heavy transport company
- 1 SpcOps company
- 1 field hospital team

- 2 reserve regiments

== Chinese Civil War ==
In March 1946, the 87th and 88th Divisions were deployed to Northeast China under the 71st Army and participated in the Battle of Benxi and the Battle of Siping. In May 1947, the 71st Army was attacked by the People's Liberation Army (PLA) near Gongzhuling; the 88th Division was almost completely annihilated, and the 87th Division also suffered heavy losses. In December 1947 the 88th Division was left to defend Siping, while the 87th and 91st Divisions were deployed to Shenyang. The 88th Division then suffered heavy losses during the Siping Campaign in 1948. In July 1948, the 88th Division was reorganized in Jinzhou under the New 8th Army, only to be annihilated during the Battle of Jinzhou later that year.

In December 1948, Chen Mingren rebuilt the 71st Army (under the jurisdiction of the 87th and 88th Divisions) in Changsha, Hunan. When Chen Mingren and Cheng Qian announced their intent to surrender Hunan to the PLA in August 1949, 71st Army commander Xiong Xinmin (熊新民) led the 87th and 88th Divisions to retreat from Hunan and join Bai Chongxi's forces.

In December 1949, the 87th and 88th Divisions participated in the Guangxi Campaign, where they were defeated by the PLA. Xiong was captured, and the 87th and 88th Divisions were defeated in the border region of Guangxi and ceased to exist.

== See also ==
- New 1st Army
- New 6th Army
- Chinese Expeditionary Force
