= Edward Broadbent (British Army officer) =

British Army general

Major-General Sir Edward Broadbent KBE CB CMG DSO
- Born: 5 May 1875
- Died: 18 June 1944 (aged 69)
- Military career
- Allegiance: United Kingdom
- Branch: British Army
- Service years: 1895 – 1939
- Rank: Major-General
- Conflicts: World War I

Major-General Sir Edward Nicholson Broadbent, KBE, CB, CMG, DSO (5 May 1875 – 18 June 1944) was a British Army officer who became Lieutenant Governor of Guernsey.

== Military career ==
Broadbent was commissioned a second lieutenant in the King's Own Scottish Borderers on 28 September 1895, and promoted to lieutenant on 26 October 1897 He served on the North West Frontier of India under Sir William Lockhart 1897–98, taking part in the Tochi Field Force and with the Tirah Expeditionary Force, and was present at the battles of Dwatoi and Bara Valley.

Following the outbreak of the Second Boer War in 1899, he joined the 1st Battalion of his regiment in South Africa in early 1900, where they took part in operations in the Orange Free State (February to May 1900), including the battles of Paardeberg (February 1900), Poplar Grove (March 1900) and Karree Siding. Later in 1900 he served in the Transvaal east of Pretoria, and the following year he served in Transvaal west of Pretoria, including the action at Vlakfontein (July 1901). For his service in the war he was promoted to captain on 18 May 1901, and was awarded the Queen's South Africa Medal with two clasps. Following the end of the war, he return to the United Kingdom in August 1902.

After a period with the Egyptian Army, he served with his regiment throughout World War I.

He was appointed Lieutenant Governor of Guernsey in 1934 and was also Colonel of the King's Own Scottish Borderers.

He is buried in Magdalen Hill Cemetery at Winchester in Hampshire.

Government offices
Preceded by Lord Ruthven of Freeland	Lieutenant Governor of Guernsey; 1934–1939	Succeeded by Alexander Telfer-Smollett
