= Alexander Telfer-Smollett =

British Army general

Major-General Alexander Telfer-Smollett CB CBE DSO MC DL
- Born: 12 August 1884
- Died: 9 October 1954 (aged 70)
- Military career
- Allegiance: United Kingdom
- Branch: British Army
- Service years: 1904–1942
- Rank: Major-General
- Nickname: "Alec"
- Service number: 522
- Unit: Highland Light Infantry
- Commands: Shanghai Area (1936–39); 157th (Highland Light Infantry) Brigade (1934–36); 1st Battalion, Highland Light Infantry (1932–34)
- Conflicts: First World War; Russian Civil War; Second World War
- Awards: Companion of the Order of the Bath; Commander of the Order of the British Empire; Distinguished Service Order; Military Cross

Major-General Alexander Patrick Drummond Telfer-Smollett, CB, CBE, DSO, MC, DL (12 August 1884 – 1954) was a British Army officer who served as Lieutenant Governor of Guernsey from 1939 to 1940.

== Military career ==
Telfer-Smollett entered and later graduated from the Royal Military College, Sandhurst, from where he was commissioned into the Highland Light Infantry in 1904. After serving in the First World War, during which he was awarded the Military Cross, and ultimately leading his regiment to victory at the Battle of Cambrai in 1918, he was awarded the Distinguished Service Order in 1919, and then saw service with the North Russia Relief Force in the Russian Civil War.

Remaining in the army during the interwar period, "Alec" Telfer-Smollett, by now a brevet lieutenant colonel, attended the Staff College, Camberley from 1920 to 1921, and then served at the War Office from 1925 to 1929, which was followed by being a Senior Staff Officer to the Inspector-General of the West African Frontier Force until 1930. 1931 to 1934 saw him as commanding officer of the 1st Battalion, Highland Light Infantry and then commander of the 157th (Highland Light Infantry) Brigade until 1935.

Telfer-Smollett was appointed commanding officer of the British Troops in Shanghai in 1936. He intervened in the Defense of Sihang Warehouse in 1937 during the Second Sino-Japanese War and facilitated the Chinese withdrawal. He went on to be Lieutenant Governor of Guernsey in 1939 and to serve as a District Commander in the UK during the Second World War from 1940, the year his son was killed in action, until his retirement in 1942.

Telfer-Smollett lived at Cameron House near Luss in Scotland and in retirement he became Lord Lieutenant of Dunbartonshire. He was also Colonel of the Highland Light Infantry.

== Bibliography ==
- Smart, Nick (2005). Biographical Dictionary of British Generals of the Second World War. Barnesley: Pen & Sword. ISBN 1844150496.

Government offices
Preceded by Sir Edward Broadbent	Lieutenant Governor of Guernsey; 1939–1940	Succeeded by John Minshull-Ford
Honorary titles
Preceded by Andrew McCulloch	Colonel of the Highland Light Infantry; 1946–1954	Succeeded by Robert Urquhart
