= Defense of Sihang Warehouse =

1937 engagement in the Battle of Shanghai

- Part of the Battle of Shanghai of the Second Sino-Japanese War
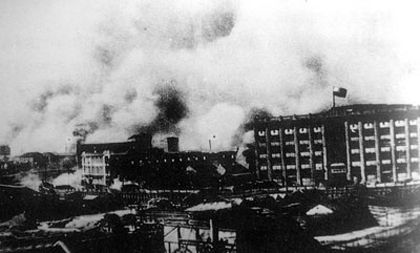
- Sihang Warehouse during the battle
Date	October 27–31, 1937 (4 days)
Location	Zhabei, Shanghai, Republic of China 31.242183°N 121.466298°E
Result	Withdrawal of Chinese forces to the Shanghai International Settlement on 31 October 1937

Belligerents
China	Japan

Commanders and leaders
(Republic of China (1912–1949)) Xie Jinyuan (Republic of China (1912–1949)) Yang Ruifu (WIA)	Okochi Denshichi; Haji Kitaro

Units involved
(Republic of China (1912–1949)) 88th Division: 1st Battalion, 524th Regiment	Shanghai Special Naval Landing Force; 10th Battalion (reinforced); Yokosuka 2nd Independent SNLF Company; Kure 1st SNLF; 8th and 9th Companies (artillery)

Strength
410–420 soldiers	~1,200 naval infantry

Casualties and losses
Chinese Records: 10–35 killed 37–54 wounded Modern Western Estimate: 33 killed and missing 50+ wounded Japanese Claim: 80–100 killed (Note: For the final assault on October 30 and October 31)	Chinese Estimates: 100–200+ killed 4 tanks destroyed or damaged Western Reports: Moderate to heavy losses Japanese Records : 1 fatal casualty among 4 wounded (Note: "支那事変概報第39号" - "China Incident Summary Report No. 39" is a formerly classified Japanese military document that covers IJN and IJA movements during the later stages of the Shanghai campaign. Frame 25 states for the following casualties on October 31 [1937] for the Naval Landing Forces. "At 0300 hours our attack force broke through and at 0310 hours completely occupied [the Sihang warehouse] and cleared out remnant enemy forces. They found approximately 80 enemy corpses and a number of weapons. Our own casualties were extremely light, with only 4 wounded. "閘北進撃戦" - "Assault on Zhabei" covers the Japanese capture of Zhabei on October 27 and the occupation of Sihang Warehouse completed on October 31. The second page lists the following casualties for the entire operation from Oct 27-31: "3 heavily wounded, 24 lightly wounded, and 14 barely wounded." "支那事変尽忠録 第三卷" - "China Incident Loyalty Record: Volume 3," a catalog of all Imperial Japanese Navy personnel killed in action or fatally wounded from the start of the Second Sino-Japanese War until December 11, 1937 has only a single entry relating to fatal casualties around Sihang Warehouse. Page 231 titled "同年十月三十日上海閘北四行倉庫附近ニ於ケル戰傷後死者" - "Same Year [1937] October 30: Those who died of their battle wounds while fighting around the Shanghai Sihang Warehouse" lists Naval Special Duty Ensign [posthumous rank] Tanaka Shiroku (田中士陸). Page 231-232 further states "Warrant Officer Tanaka was a platoon leader in the Haji Corps, Sunouchi Company, landing at Shanghai on the evening of August 19 and being placed under the Shanghai Special Naval Landing Force Commander's authority." Page 233 continues "Tanaka was heavily wounded by an enemy machine gun round passing through his lower left leg at 6:25 PM [on Oct 30]. He was bandaged at his position and immediately transferred to the hospital for treatment. He temporarily improved in health but by November 2 his condition suddenly worsened and on the same day at 3:30 PM he honorably died of his battle wounds.")
- Location within Shanghai

Sihang Warehouse

Chinese name
- Traditional Chinese: 四行倉庫
- Simplified Chinese: 四行仓库
Transcriptions
Standard Mandarin
- Hanyu Pinyin: Sìháng Cāngkù

Eight Hundred Heroes
- Traditional Chinese: 八百壯士
- Simplified Chinese: 八百壮士
Transcriptions
Standard Mandarin
- Hanyu Pinyin: Bābǎi Zhùangshì

Japanese name
- Kanji: 四行倉庫
Transcriptions
- Romanization: shikousouko

The Defense of Sihang Warehouse (Chinese: 四行倉庫保衛戰) took place from October 27 to October 31, 1937, and marked the beginning of the end of the three-month Battle of Shanghai in the opening phase of the Second Sino-Japanese War. Defenders of the warehouse held out against numerous waves of Japanese forces to cover Chinese forces retreating west during the Battle of Shanghai.

The Chinese defenders were composed of a single half-strength battalion from the elite German-trained 88th Division, who had fortified and occupied the large "Four Banks" (Sihang) Warehouse in the downtown Zhabei district, along with several buildings. The warehouse's location just across the Suzhou Creek from the Shanghai International Settlement meant the battle took place in full view of the Western powers. Tens of thousands of Chinese and Western civilians were thus able to witness the battle as it unfolded.

After enduring several days of repeated attacks by the Japanese, the Chinese defenders were permitted to retreat into the nearby International Settlement, which they managed to do with most of their strength intact.

The defense of the warehouse and media reporting of the event provided a morale-lifting consolation to the Chinese army and people in the demoralizing aftermath of the Japanese invasion of China.

Japanese sources on the Defense of Sihang Warehouse differ, which record the defense as being a relatively minor skirmish within the entire Battle of Shanghai.

== Background ==
Map of the area around the warehouse: Sihang Warehouse, garrisoned by NRA troops Foreign concessions, international settlements

By 26 October 1937, Chinese resistance in the district of Zhabei was faltering. Generalissimo Chiang Kai-shek wanted to withdraw all forces in the area to defend the rural western regions of Shanghai, and ordered Gu Zhutong, acting commander of the 3rd Military Region, to leave the 88th Division behind to buy time and canvass international support by showing the other nations of the Nine Powers (which were to convene on 6 November) China's determination to resist the Japanese during the Second Sino-Japanese War.

Neither Gu, Sun, nor Zhang were about to disobey Chiang's orders, but Sun (via Zhang) suggested to Gu that the number of troops left to cover the withdrawal would not matter for such a show of determination. In his words, "How many people we sacrifice would not make a difference; it would achieve the same purpose."

At 10 p.m. on 26 October, the 524th Regiment, based at the Shanghai North Railway Station, received orders to withdraw to the divisional headquarters at Sihang Warehouse. 1st Battalion commander Yang Ruifu was distraught at having to abandon a position he had held for more than two months.

== Order of battle and equipment ==
=== National Revolutionary Army ===
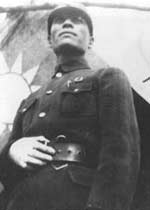
Lieutenant Colonel Xie Jinyuan, commander of the Chinese force

- 524th Regiment, 88th Division: Regimental commander (CO), Army Lieutenant Colonel Xie Jinyuan
  Executive officer (XO), Army Major Shangguan Zhibiao (上官志標)
  - 1st Battalion, 524th Regiment: Battalion Commander, Army Major Yang Ruifu (楊瑞符)
    - 1st Company, 1st Battalion: Company commander, Army Captain Tao Xingchun (陶杏春)
    - 2nd Company, 1st Battalion: Company commander, Army Captain Deng Ying (鄧英)
    - 3rd Company, 1st Battalion: Company commander, Army Captain Shi Meihao (石美豪, wounded), Army Captain Tang Di (唐棣)
    - Machine Gun Company, 1st Battalion: Company commander, Army Captain Lei Xiong (雷雄)

Initially containing around 800 men, the 1st was technically an over-strength battalion, but casualties suffered over the course of the Battle of Shanghai reduced its actual strength just prior to the battle to 452 men (some sources give 423), including officers. Because of the confusion of the general retreat, some units may have failed to make it to the warehouse, which caused a further reduction in strength, down to only 414 men present at the beginning of the battle. Two months of intense fighting had also whittled down the original German-trained troops, and after five rounds of reinforcements, the majority of soldiers and officers in the battalion were garrison troops from the surrounding provinces.

Most of the men were from the 1st Battalion, 5th Regiment of the Hubei Provincial Garrison. Hubei did not want to send its best troops to Shanghai, as these had trained over a decade to fight against the Chinese Communists. Thus, many of the soldiers sent as reinforcements to Shanghai were green recruits, with the latest batch recruited after the outbreak of war on 7 July.

The regiment was assigned used equipment from the front-line troops of the 88th, and was well equipped considering the poor equipment that most Chinese forces had. Photos and records show that soldiers were each issued a rifle, likely a Hanyang 88 or Chiang Kai-shek rifle, 300 rounds of 8 mm Mauser, two crates of M24 stick grenades, a German-made M1935 Stahlhelm, a gas mask, and food pouch. There was a total of 27 light machine guns, mostly Czech ZB vz.26, approximately one for each squad. The four water-cooled Type 24 Maxim guns were the only heavy weapons available to the battalion—a mortar platoon assigned to them was never mentioned by participants of the battle, and was therefore unlikely to have joined the battle.

=== Imperial Japanese Forces ===
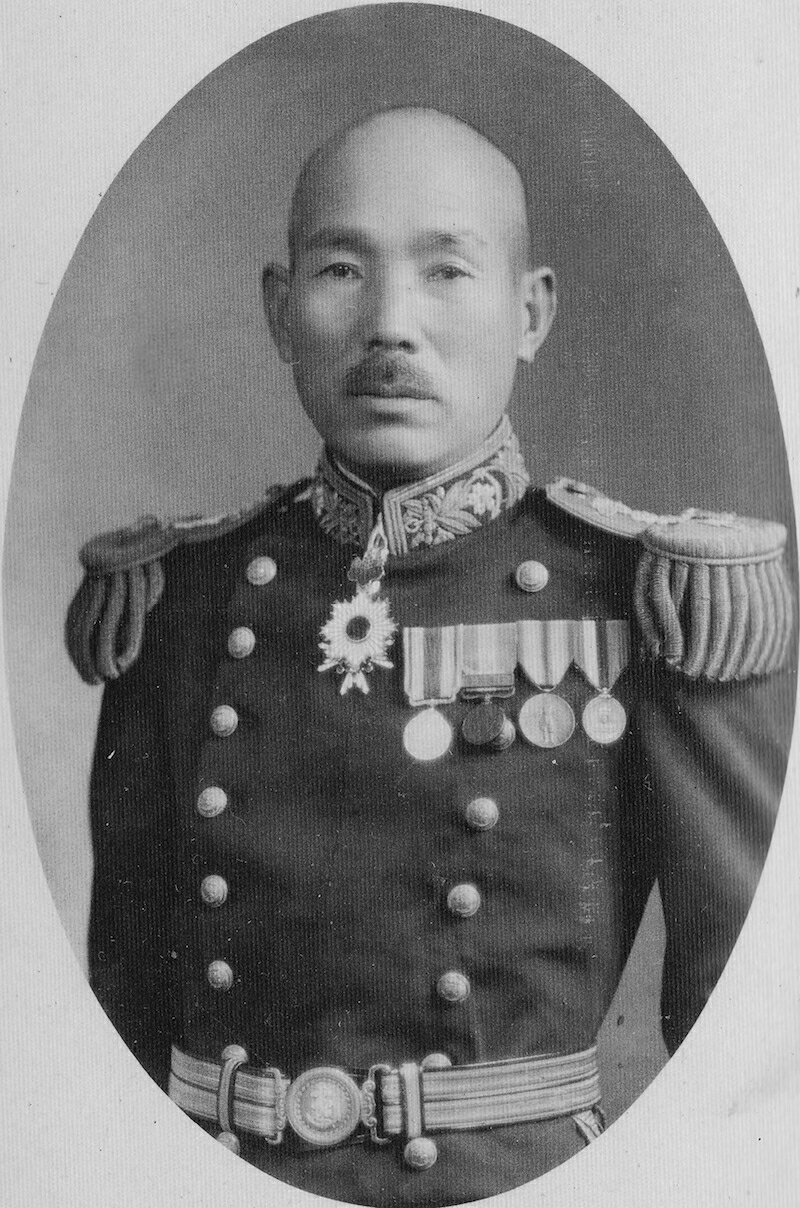
Rear Admiral Ōkochi Denshichi, Commander of the Shanghai SNLF.

- Shanghai Special Naval Landing Force: Rear Admiral Okochi Denshichi
  - Shanghai SNLF 10th Battalion: Lieutenant-Commander Haji Kitaro
    - Yokosuka 2nd Independent SNLF Company
    - Kure 1st SNLF
    - Shanghai SNLF 8th and 9th Companies

Captain Okochi Denshichi had been assigned command of the Shanghai SNLF on November 16, 1936, and was promoted to Rear Admiral at the beginning of the following month. Prior to the Battle of Shanghai the Shanghai SNLF had a strength of just over 2300 men, but shortly before the battle the force began to be hastily reinforced with additional Special Naval Landing Forces and ship crews deployed on land. Reinforcements would continue to arrive throughout the course of the battle and by October 1937 the force exceeded 10,000 men in strength.

On the morning of October 27, 1937 the Shanghai Special Naval Landing Force would launch an attack to take over Zhabei. Their attacking forces were known as the "Zhabei Force," and made of the Shanghai SNLF"s 2nd, 3rd, 6th, 10th, and 12th Battalions. The Shanghai SNLF 10th Battalion would be assigned to the Zhabei Force's Southern Section and serve as the main force opposing the defenders of Sihang Warehouse.

The 10th Battalion—noted as a reservist battalion—had a strength of 506 men and 21 officers under the command of Lieutenant Commander Haji Kitaro. Haji's 10th Battalion arrived in Shanghai on the evening of August 19 and was initially used as a reserve force. The battalion later served in Yangshupu from August 21 to 24, before returning to guard the Shanghai Special Naval Landing Force Headquarters in Hongkou. On September 21 the battalion was deployed to the sector south of Jukong Road on North Szechuan Road. On September 28, the Yokosuka 2nd Independent SNLF "Kobayashi" Company numbering around 257 men (Note: The Independent SNLF companies arrived on September 18, 1937 and numbered 1539 men in total (57 officer + 1482 enlisted). As there were six total companies, the strength per company should be roughly 257.) was placed under Haji's command and would serve as the 10th Battalion's 3rd Company

From September 29 to October 6, Haji's 10th Battalion and the 2nd Battalion fought fiercely against the 88th Division around the North Szechuan Road in efforts to advance to the Songhu Railway Line. The fighting resulted in eight dead and another 33 wounded in the 10th Battalion.

The Shanghai SNLF's 8th and 9th Companies, originally attached to the 4th Battalion (Artillery Battalion), would also provide support with howitzers and mountain guns during the assault on Sihang Warehouse. The Shanghai SNLF's records on attack indicate they utilized eight 8 cm mountain guns, two 12 cm howitzers, and four more 15 cm howitzers.

- Imperial Japanese Army 3rd Division

According to Western historian Stephen Robinson, on October 25 following the fall of Dachang, the 3rd Division advanced past Zoumatang creek behind the 9th Division, and entered Zhabei to encounter the remaining Chinese battalion in the Sihang Warehouse. Period Japanese military reports, Senshi Sosho—the official war monographs of the Imperial Japanese Army and Navy authored by the Japanese National Institute for Defense Studies, and the IJA 3rd Division's unit history record that the division was engaged along the Suzhou River Crossing Operation at the time. Chinese reportage writer Xu Zhigeng also stated that the 3rd Division, after capturing Wusong, Yanghang, Liuhang, Wenzaobin, and Dachang, participated in the fierce battle to cross the Suzhou River on October 28. The "China's Anti-Japanese War Combat Operations", the first comprehensive historical record for the main battlefields of China's War of Resistance to be written in mainland China, stated that the 9th Division and 3rd Division of Japan's Shanghai Expeditionary Army reached the north bank of the Suzhou River on October 28 and the 3rd Division began crossing the river at around noon on October 31. "A Battlefield Photographic Documentary of the Battle of Shanghai" identified the Landing Force of the Imperial Japanese Navy as the unit which attacked and captured the Sihang Warehouse. The "Illustrated History of the Japanese Invasion of China" identified the Landing Force of the Imperial Japanese Navy as the unit which started mopping-up Zhabei on October 27 and captured Sihang Warehouse on October 31 in the "Japanese Troops Captured Zhabei, Dachang Town, and Other Places" section. The 3rd Division was also identified as the unit which captured the radio broadcasting station in Zhenru on October 27 in the "Japanese Troops Forcibly Crossed the Suzhou River" section. Initial Chinese translation of Japanese reports also showed that the SNLF was the unit which faced the Sihang Warehouse defenders.

== Battle ==
=== Chinese and Western Accounts of Events ===
==== October 27 ====
===== Chinese Preparation =====
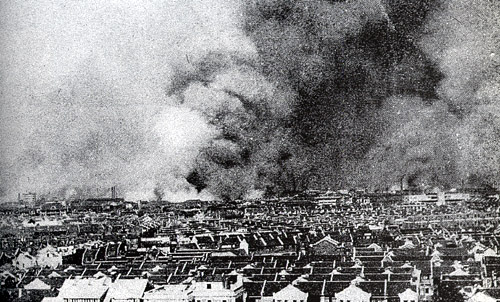
Zhabei district burning on the morning of October 27, immediately before the fighting near Sihang Warehouse began.

In the morning of October 27, the various companies of the 524th Regiment 1st Battalion were trickling in from Zhabei, under orders from Xie Jinyuan. The effort was difficult, as some units in the battalion had begun moving west with the bulk of the Chinese Army. Visibility was compromised by the heavy presence of smoke and fire, as much of the Zhabei district had been set on fire by the retreating Chinese units. Through the efforts of several messengers, most of the men were rallied from the retreating mass of soldiers. By 9 a.m. the last remaining forces in the battalion had turned up at the warehouse, a force of just over 400 men and officers. That these men had volunteered for the defense was later noted by Chiang Kai-shek as exemplary soldierly conduct.

The Chinese spread out their forces across the warehouse and the outlying perimeter. The 1st Company had taken positions on the right flank of the warehouse along the Tibet Road, the 3rd Company on the left across the Bank of Communications building, and the 2nd Company on the northern and southern sides under the leadership of Major Yang Ruifu. Two Type-24 Maxim heavy machine guns were installed on the roof in an anti-aircraft role, while the other machine guns were distributed to the 1st and 3rd Companies.

===== Opening skirmishes =====
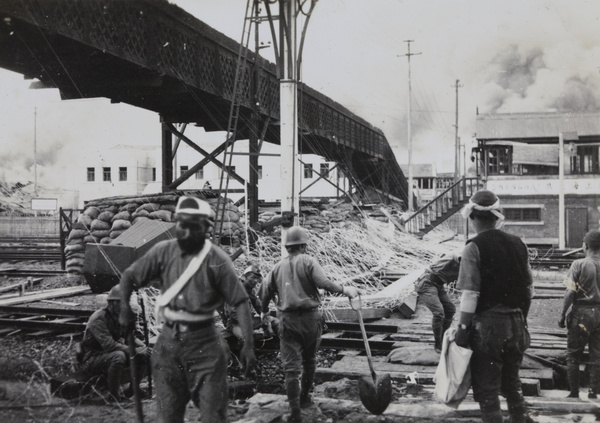
Japanese SNLF in the ruins of the Shanghai North Railway Station, immediately before attacking Sihang Warehouse, October 27

At 5:05 AM, the Imperial Japanese Navy's Shanghai Special Naval Landing Force (Shanghai SNLF) ordered their forces to launch a general assault on Zhabei. Domei News Agency reported on the Shanghai SNLF's rapid movements through Zhabei, relaying that the Haji and Sano Units had commenced their attacks from the North Szechuan Road area and Haji's men had successfully taken the Pantheon Theatre by 6:55 AM. The troops continued west and captured the North Railway Station at 7:20 AM, with the Japanese Naval Ensign reported to be flying atop the Railway Administration Bureau ten minutes later. A Chinese platoon positioned in the advance outposts began sniping at Japanese patrols around that time, and over the next two hours, the Chinese platoon began a fighting retreat back to the warehouse perimeter.

At 7:30 AM, Yang Ruifu received word from his guard force of the Japanese advance towards their position east of the North Station at Han Bridge. Yang ordered his men to not retreat without orders and resist with all their might. 45 minutes later, he was notified the station had fallen into Japanese hands.

Domei reported that at 9:20 AM, Haji and Sano's forces began their advance into the Zhabei Pocket to sweep out remaining resistance from Chinese forces. As the Japanese approached the warehouse, the Chinese defenders took defensive positions on the different floors of the warehouse and along the outer wall surrounding the building, whilst watching for enemy movement through the slots inside the walls.

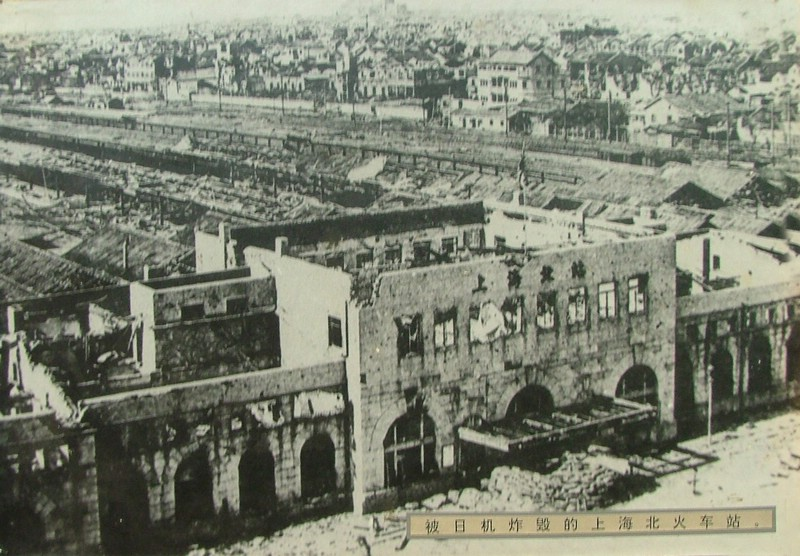
The Shanghai North Railway Station, after months of fighting and bombing.

At 1 p.m. a column of Japanese soldiers was seen marching towards the warehouse in what appeared to be a victory parade, brandishing a large Rising Sun banner. Once they were close enough, the Chinese defenders opened fire. Five Japanese soldiers fell to the ground, while the rest of the column scattered for cover.

The Japanese then attacked the Bank of Communications to the immediate west of the warehouse. Hundreds of Japanese marines were seen assaulting the street fortifications surrounding the warehouse, using "trench mortars" on several occasions to clear the area. However, upon attempting to secure some abandoned fortifications, several Japanese soldiers stumbled into a trap: the Chinese defenders, having preemptively rigged a bunker with grenades and a mortar round, "pulled the grenade rope," killing another five Japanese soldiers in the ensuing explosions.

Chinese defenders continued developing defenses by sealing the warehouse's doors, windows and entry points, as well as constructing makeshift dummy positions on the perimeter to draw Japanese fire and waste ammunition.

===== First attacks on Sihang Warehouse =====
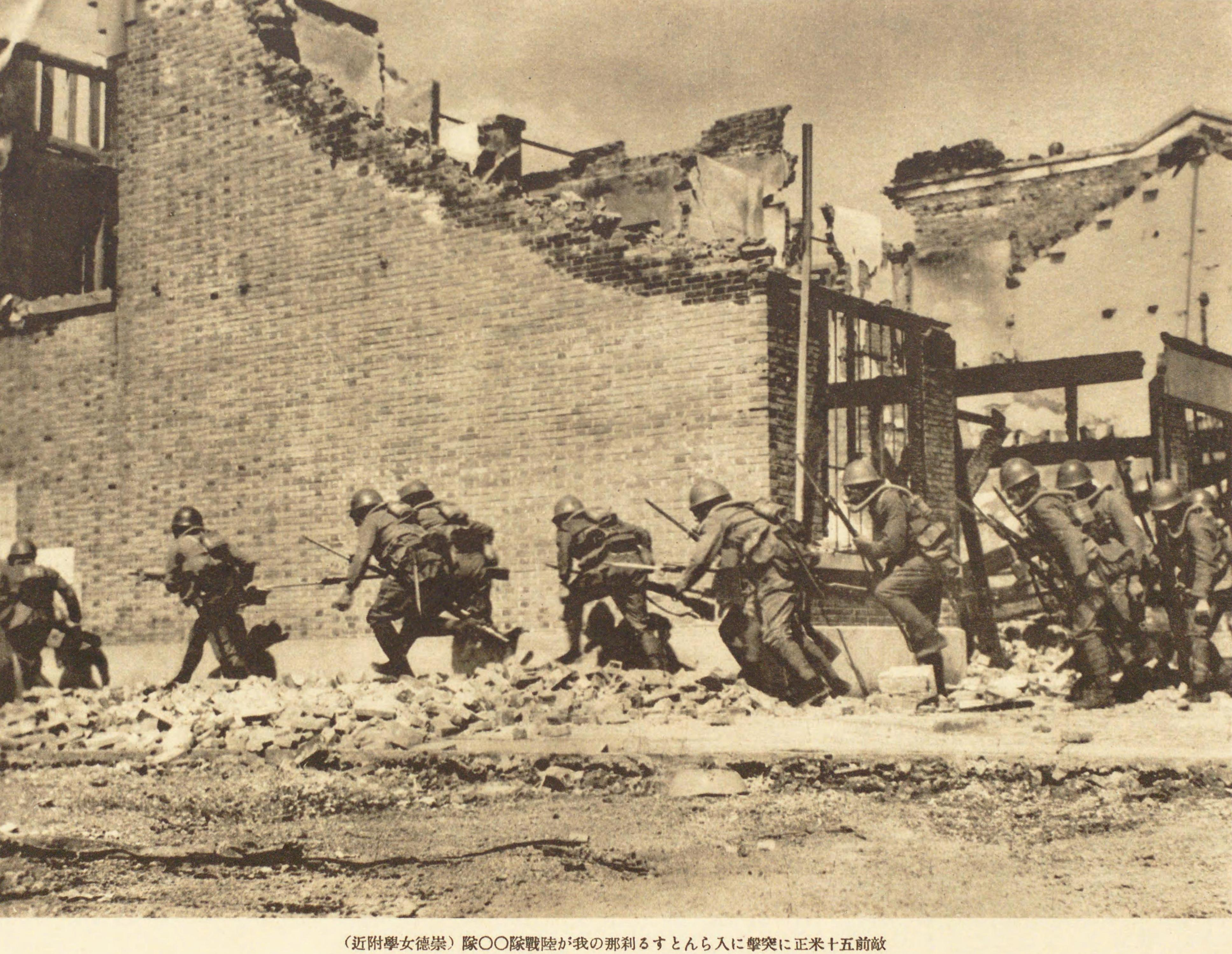
Shanghai SNLF naval infantry in action in downtown Shanghai, October 1937.

Japanese marines received reinforcements and began attempts to break into the warehouse around soon after, targeting the warehouse from North Suzhou Road. They were soon met with intense fire from the Chinese. The Japanese, numbering some fifty strong, began advancing on the warehouse under the cover of steel shields slotted for rifle fire. A group of Chinese reconnaissance troops, led by platoon leader Yin Qiucheng (尹求成), exchanged fire with the attacking formations near the Wuzhen Bridge, killing four Japanese soldiers according to a journalist watching across the river.

According to one foreign eye-witness quoted in the Shanghai-based North China Herald, the Japanese began attempting to break their way into the Sihang Warehouse around 10 AM. From the south bank of the Suzhou Creek in the International Settlement, another reporter observed the Naval Landing Forces—armed with machine-guns, rifles, hand-grenades, some Chinese swords, and steel shields—advance east along the Suzhou Creek and take over an abandoned Chinese redoubt west of the warehouse on Wuzhen Road (鳥鎮路) at 11:15 AM.

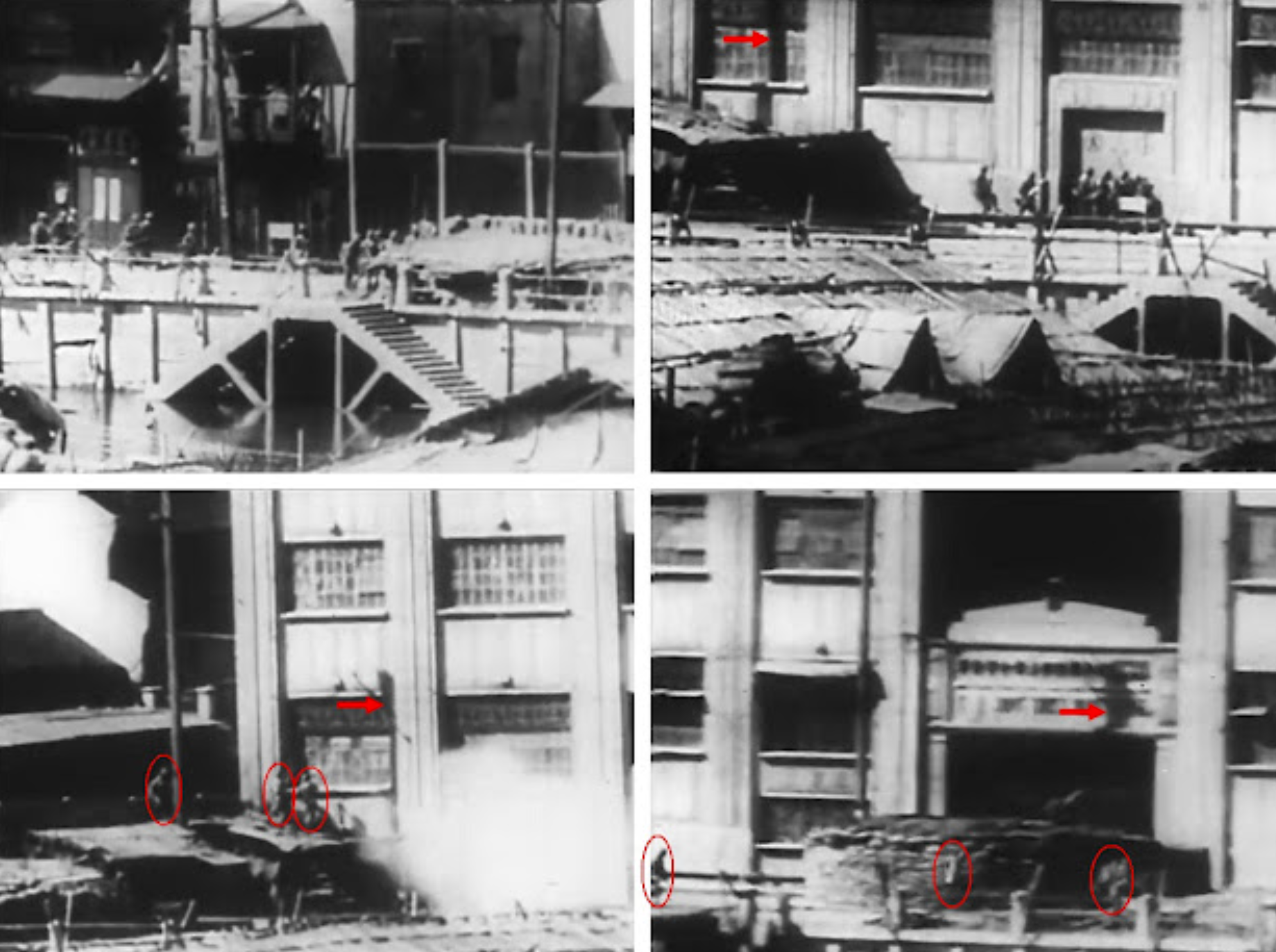
A series of frames taken from footage of the Japanese attacks on October 27. The smoke trails are from grenades detonating in the street, thrown from the warehouse roof by Chinese defenders.

The Japanese increased their firepower on the building, and managed to push the Chinese from their frontline sandbag positions with hand grenades back to their secondary lines. As the battle continued, 3rd Company captain Shi Meihao was shot in the face but continued to command the defense until he was hit in the leg. Eventually, the Chinese were forced to abandon the outer wall, and barricaded themselves inside the warehouse itself. When the Japanese attempted to follow them to the edge of the warehouse, they were attacked by hand grenades thrown by Chinese soldiers positioned on the upper floors, forcing them to take cover in a blind spot at the south-west of the warehouse. Noticing them, a dozen Chinese soldiers climbed onto the roof and hurled mortar rounds and grenades down at the Japanese, killing seven and wounding between twenty and thirty. The survivors were then driven away when a Chinese machine gunner began to shoot at them from one of the warehouse windows.

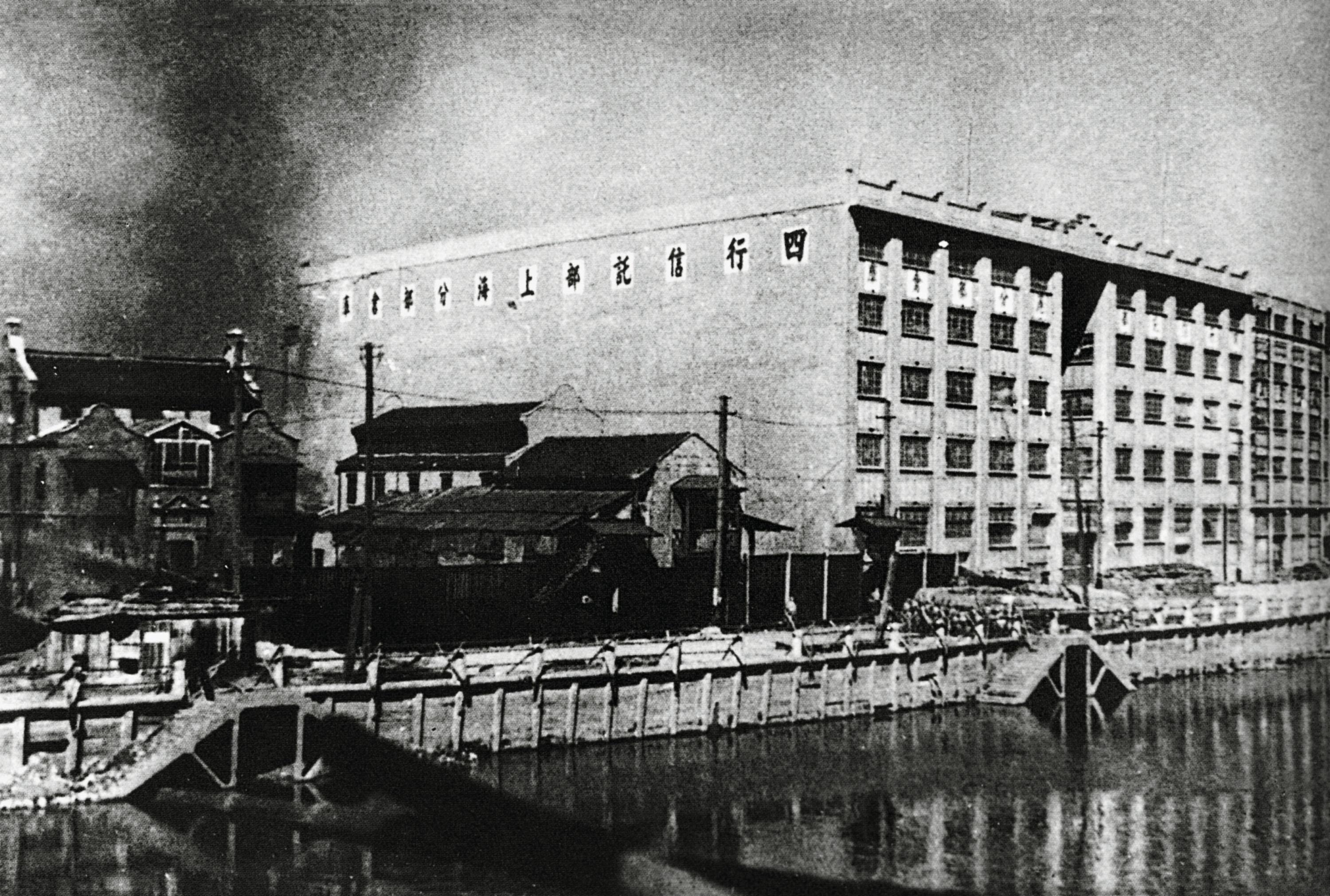
The Sihang Warehouse during the defense. Note the black Chinese characters painted on the west wall.

Word had been spreading since the early morning that there were still Chinese forces defending Zhabei near the warehouse. As the battle continued, crowds of spectators began to amass on the other side of the 60-yard Suzhou Creek, reportedly cheering every time a Japanese soldier was killed.

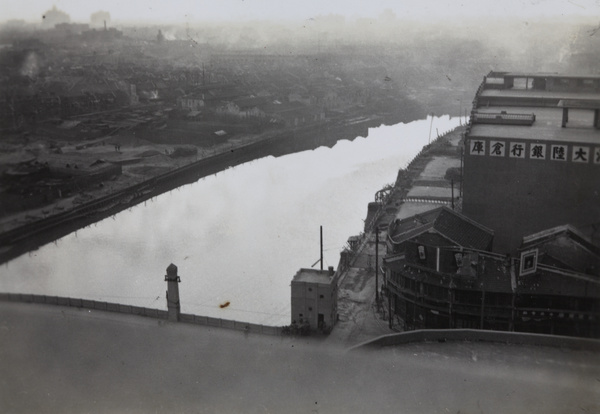
A photograph showing the position of Sihang Warehouse to the International Settlement. The proximity enabled many Western and Chinese civilians to watch the battle from a short distance.

At one point during the battle, foreign correspondents witnessed a group of Japanese soldiers slowly approaching the warehouse through the rubble, taking 50 minutes to cover 50 yards. However, the Chinese defenders, who had been watching the Japanese approach from hidden vantage points the entire time, rained hand grenades down on the group the moment they were close enough. After the dust had settled, survivors were finished off with rifles, and several Japanese who rushed forward to rescue their wounded were killed too.

A journalist witnessing the combat estimated that sixty Japanese were killed in total during the assault by machine gun fire and grenades. In a letter Colonel Xie wrote to his superior 88th Division Commander Sun Yuanliang, his defenders had killed around eighty Japanese soldiers in the attacks on October 27. In a top-secret report on the China Incident from the Japanese Navy restricted to high-ranking officers, a total of three Naval Landing Force troops were recorded as seriously wounded and 24 more injured during the takeover of Zhabei on October 27. The North China Herald reported that both sides had sustained casualties.

Chinese defenders and civilian spectators observed dogs dragging away Japanese casualties during nighttime. As night fell, the Chinese defenders were tasked with constructing fortifications and repairing any damages sustained during the attacks. Nobody was given any sleep.

==== October 28 ====
By the morning of the 28th, the presence of the Chinese battalion in Zhabei had been made known by radio news and several newspapers including North-China Herald, an English-language newspaper based in Shanghai and regarded as the most influential foreign newspaper of its time. The strength of the battalion was estimated at 500 men from the 88th Division, with around 150 having barricaded themselves in the warehouse itself. Authorities within the International Settlement repeatedly attempted to persuade the defenders to lay down their weapons and surrender in the Settlement, but the defenders stated they were "determined to die for China."

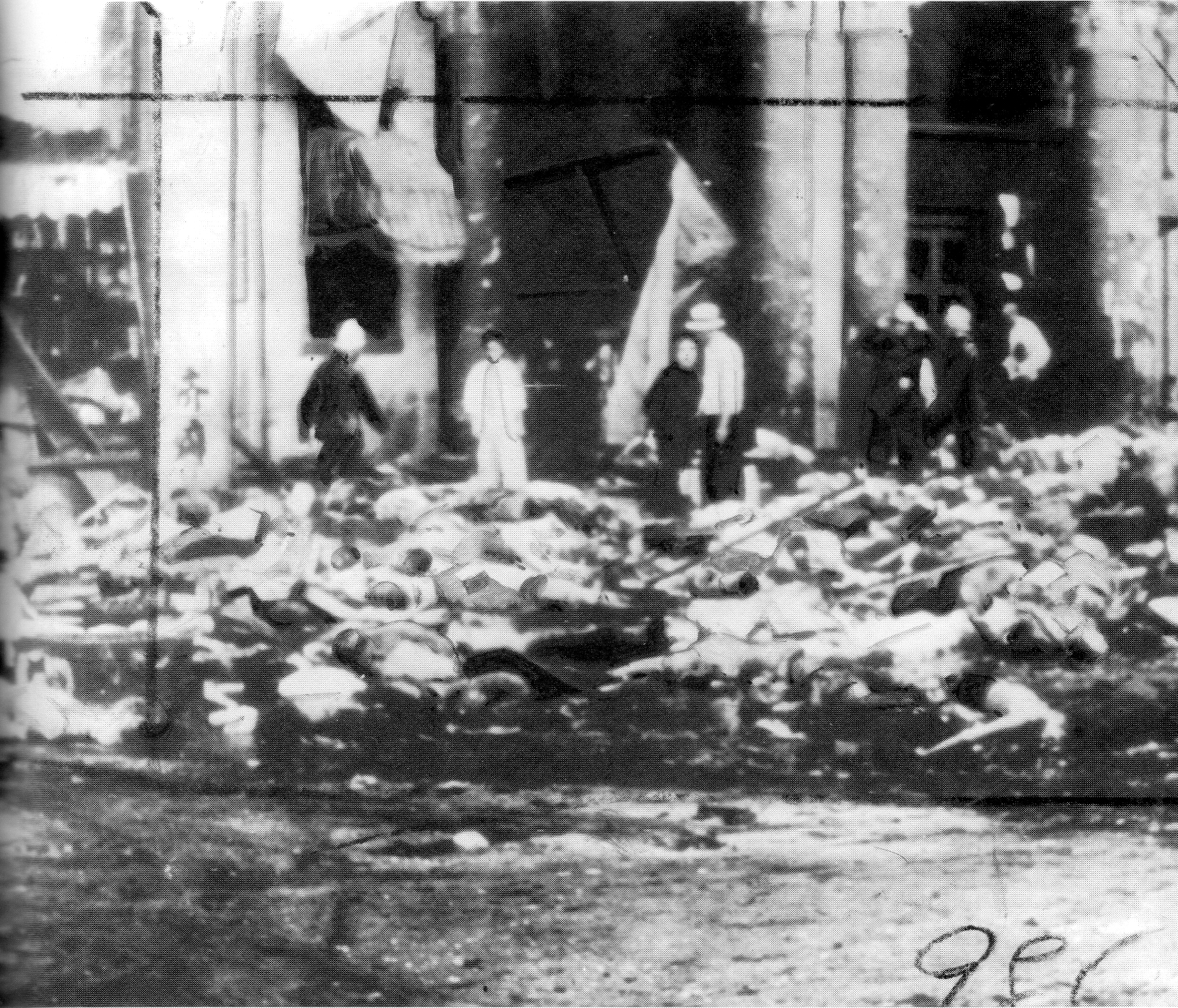
Victims of "Bloody Saturday," killed by a bombing in the Shanghai International Settlement.

At 7 a.m. a flight of Japanese bombers circled above the warehouse but did not drop any bombs, for fear of hitting the concessions in a repeat of "Bloody Saturday." An hour later, Major Yang gave a speech to the officers and squad leaders and then inspected the defenses constructed by the soldiers. While on the roof with Colonel Xie Jinyuan and a group of sentries, they spotted a group of Japanese soldiers walking on the Suzhou Road along the Suzhou Creek, which according to Yang Ruifu was about 1 km (1,100 yd) away. Xie ordered a sentry to give him his rifle and then fired on the group; one of them promptly fell dead.

===== Second assault on Sihang Warehouse =====
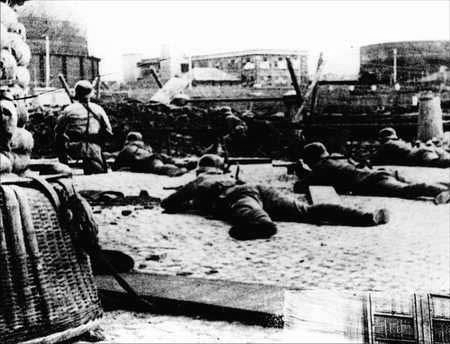
Chinese soldiers positioned on the roof of Sihang Warehouse, October 28th

At 3 p.m., the Japanese mounted a second assault on the warehouse, bombarding the building with five artillery pieces and machine gun fire from the Bank of Communications rooftop. The Chinese retaliated with machine gun fire of their own and showered hand grenades onto Japanese soldiers attempting to approach the warehouse, which was reported on by the English newspaper North China Daily News. Japanese troops made repeated efforts to capture the warehouse, but were beaten back each time by the Chinese after brief exchanges of fire.

The Japanese, outnumbering the Chinese defenders and repeatedly screaming "Banzai," then deployed trench mortars. Several fires broke out across the battlefield, with Chinese soldiers shooting back with rifles and Mauser pistols. Both sides suffered casualties in the intense firefight.

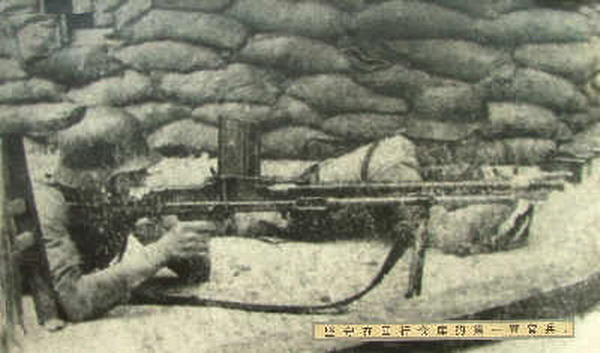
A Chinese light machine gun position in Sihang Warehouse.

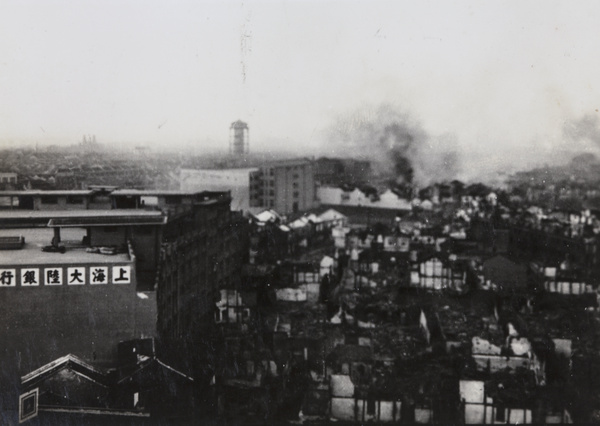
The North end of Sihang Warehouse on October 28

The combat was witnessed by thousands of Chinese and foreigners who had gathered across the Suzhou Creek, who relayed enemy assembly locations and operations to the defenders using large blackboards. Witnesses described the armament of the attacking Japanese Naval Landing Forces as machine-guns, rifles, hand-grenades, a few captured Chinese broadswords, and steel shields. Another western observer witnessed three Japanese troops make their way along the south wall of the warehouse. As one of the men attempted to smash a window to the warehouse, a Chinese soldier dropped a hand grenade from a third story window, which exploded behind them in the street. The same observer noted while the Japanese had encircled the warehouse and sporadic fighting occurred throughout the day, the Japanese apparently were making no determined effort to take the building by assault, as the warehouse's fortress-like nature would make doing so a costly endeavor.

As the fighting continued, the crowds watching the battle across the Creek were forced to relocate to the rooftops of nearby buildings after machine gun bullets began to land in the Settlement. After two hours, the Japanese gave up the assault, but cut off water and electricity to the warehouse, forcing the Chinese to institute rationing. The defenders also collected their urine in large barrels to extinguish any potential fires.

===== Supply situation and the "800 Heroes" =====
The defenders inside the warehouse contacted the Shanghai Chamber of Commerce, whose telephone number was provided by Girl Guide Yang Huimin. Yang Huimin had previously delivered a request for food, ammunition and lubricant on behalf of the defenders to the Chamber, but had been unsuccessful. Xie requested that Shanghai Mayor Yui supply his men with 500 lb. salt, 500 lb. sugar, and 50,000 Chinese biscuits.

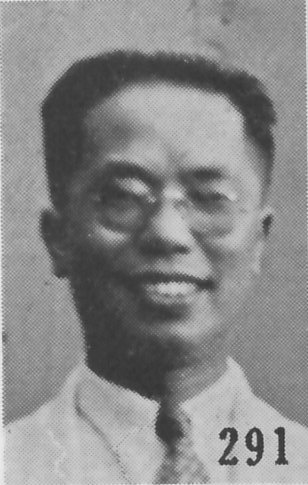
Shanghai Mayor Yu (Yui) Hongjun.

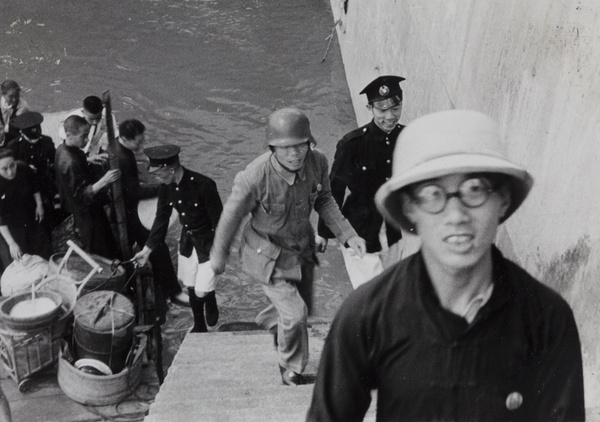
Chinese soldiers and civilians unload food and supplies off the Suzhou Creek near Sihang

By the evening of October 28, Chinese civilians inside the Settlement had organized a large collection of food, clothing, medicine and other supplies via the Shanghai Chamber of Commerce. In total, more than ten truckloads of aid were donated by Shanghai's citizens, including fruit, bread, cigarettes, newspapers and mail. The supplies were then ferried across the New Lese Bridge under the cover of darkness and unloaded next to the warehouse.

The defenders were also facing a problem in the growing number of wounded soldiers, who were unable to receive adequate medical treatment whilst stranded in the warehouse. Through an established phone link, the Chinese organized their transfer across the nearby Lese Bridge into the International Settlement, where they would be transported to hospitals in the Chinese part of Shanghai. As medics began to evacuate ten of the most severely wounded soldiers, Major Yang Ruifu ordered that the men not disclose their actual numbers, and give the original battalion strength of 800 soldiers if asked so as to not "embolden the Japanese." British Royal Welsh Fusiliers positioned on the southern bank of the creek provided assistance to the evacuation efforts.

Soon after the evacuation, Shanghai newspapers announced soon after that 800 soldiers were defending the warehouse, including the Central News Agency. As word spread about the fighting near Sihang Warehouse, international newspapers began to report on the battalion's defense, including the New York Times, The Guardian, and the Sydney Morning Herald.

As they had the previous night, no Chinese soldiers were permitted to sleep and were instead ordered to continue repairing the defenses.

===== Delivery of the Chinese flag =====
As the combat around Sihang Warehouse had been unfolding, Chinese girl guide Yang Huimin had been watching the fighting from a British bunker near the Lese Bridge. She had noticed that Zhabei was covered in Japanese flags, and was troubled by the lack of a Chinese flag. She reported her observations to the Shanghai Chamber of Commerce, whose leaders decided to give her a large Republic of China flag to deliver to the defenders.

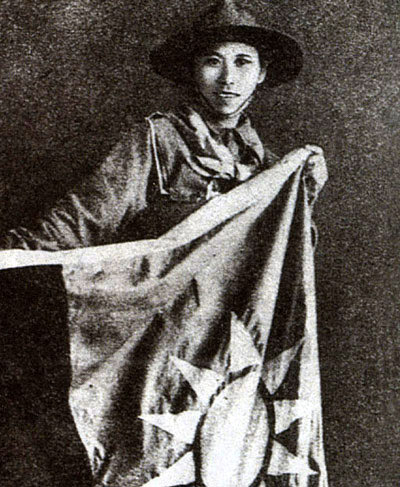
Yang Huimin posing with the ROC flag.

Yang Huimin wrapped the flag around her body underneath her scout uniform, before returning to the British bunker around evening. Upon sensing a brief opening, Yang snuck past the British sentries patrolling the bank and rushed across the bridge to the warehouse under cover of darkness.

Regiment-sized Chinese units did not carry army or national flags during the war, so when Yang Huimin delivered the flag to the warehouse, Xie Jinyuan personally accepted the flag as the highest-ranking officer present. When Yang Huimin asked for the soldiers' plans, she was told "defend to the death." Yang Huimin then asked for a list of all the soldiers' names to announce to the entire country.

As doing so would inform the Japanese of their real strength, Xie did not disclose the information. Instead, he asked someone to write down around the eight hundred names from the original roster of the 524th Regiment, imitating Yang Ruifu's earlier decision to conceal their true strength. The defenders also gave Yang Huimin messages written in Chinese calligraphy on handkerchiefs. Taking Xie's advice, Yang Huimin returned to the opposite bank of the Suzhou Creek by swimming underwater to avoid detection.

==== October 29 ====
===== Raising the Flag =====
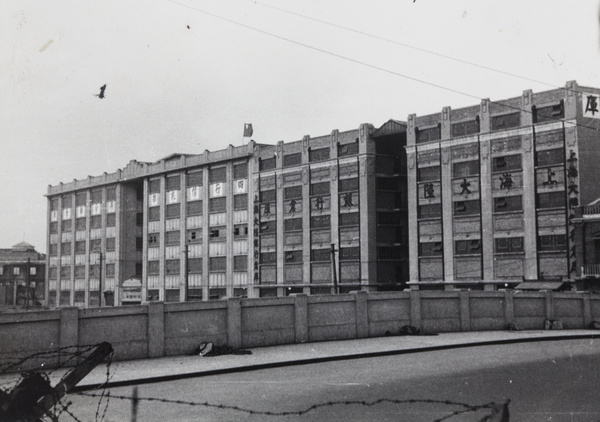
Yang Huimin's flag flies over Sihang Warehouse, photographed from the New Lese Bridge

At 6 a.m. on the morning of October 29, the Chinese defenders raised the flag, measuring four meters (13 ft) wide, on the roof of Sihang Warehouse. Since the defenders did not possess a flagpole, they had improvised a makeshift pole made from two bamboo culms tied together. Only a small group of soldiers attended the flag-raising ceremony, including several buglers and orderlies. Yang Huimin also witnessed the event upon escaping across the Creek, which was reportedly conducted quietly with less than twenty soldiers in attendance.

Upon noticing the flag, a crowd of roughly thirty thousand people, consisting of both Chinese and foreigners, gathered across the river. The flag measured larger than any of the Japanese flags in the area and reportedly flew higher than the Japanese-held buildings in the vicinity. Many of the Chinese civilians began to shout "Long live the Republic of China!" (Chinese: 中華民國萬歲！; pinyin: Zhōnghuá Mínguó wànsuì!.

American reporter Keane Arundel who witnessed the event compared the situation to the Alamo, and described the scene as "a symbol of China's heroic resolution to accept annihilation than Japanese conquest. To Shanghai's Americans it recalled Texas' historic Alamo, where Americans died in 1836 rather than yield to Mexico."

Crowds continued to gather to watch the event unfold and some were observed carrying food for the defenders. One Chinese observer, a 31-year old Shanghai City Government employee, was mistaken for a Japanese spy because of his Manchurian accent and lynched by a mob before authorities could rescue him.

The Japanese, angered by the display, began harassing the defenders by shooting from the nearby Bank of Communications building, and also reportedly sent several aircraft to attack the flag. Because of heavy anti-aircraft fire and fear of hitting the foreign concessions, the planes soon left without destroying the flag.

===== Third assault on Sihang Warehouse =====
In the afternoon of October 29, the Chinese defenders received a warning over telephone that Chinese civilians had spotted a force of several hundred Japanese troops converging on the warehouse. Minutes later, British soldiers guarding the New Lese Bridge provided a similar warning of a "final enemy assault loom[ing] ahead."

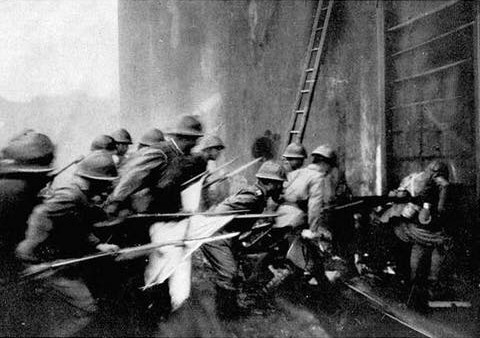
Japanese soldiers rush the west wall of Sihang Warehouse, October 29.

The Japanese attacked at 2 p.m. with concentrated fire from numerous artillery pieces, and shelled the warehouse for more than an hour. However, the Chinese defenders were protected by the ten-foot-thick walls and only suffered a few wounded soldiers. Historian Eric Niderost wrote that the Japanese then attacked the warehouse from three directions with hundreds of infantry and support from five Type 94 Te-Ke tankettes, which Yang Ruifu observed advancing down the road.

The Japanese intensified their efforts to captured the warehouse, peppering the building with bullets and rifle-grenade fire while reinforcing their machine gun positions on North Suzhou Road. The Japanese shelled the warehouse with a barrage of four rounds from their field guns around 3 p.m.

According to Baicheng Shangguan, Xie was positioned at a window where Japanese attempted to attack with ladders. He grabbed the first Japanese soldier's rifle, choked him with the other hand, shoved him off, and finally shot another Japanese soldier on the ladder before pushing the ladder off. Yang Ruifu makes no reference to such an event or the Japanese assaulting with ladders in his account of the fighting on the 29th.

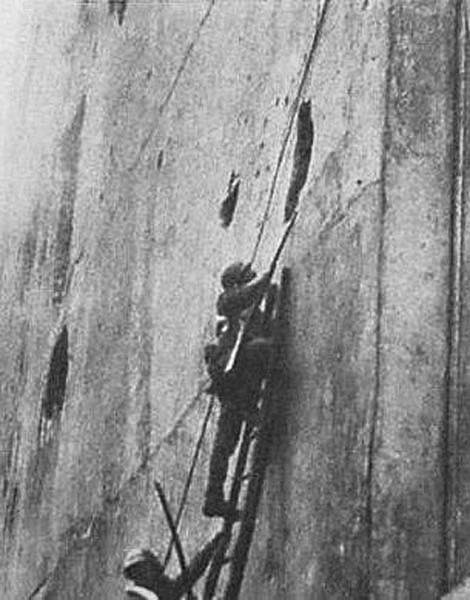
Japanese troops scale the west wall of Sihang Warehouse, October 29.

Journalist Kean Arundel observed that "Chinese guns blazed defiantly at Japanese who surrounded the building on three sides." Japanese fire from a field gun was met with rifle fire from the warehouse roof. The Japanese were observed by western observers to have assaulted the warehouse again and again with infantry charges, but each time were repelled by showers of hand grenades and machine-gun fire. At one point, the Japanese were reported to have attempted to "dynamite" the warehouse, but failed.

At 4 p.m. one Japanese soldier rushed into the open and fired a number of shots into the corner of the warehouse, causing the defenders to take cover "with lightning speed." Although wounded from the returning Chinese fire, the Japanese attacker escaped. At one point, Chinese defenders chiseled holes through the large black characters on the west wall for use as vantage points. Subsequently, several Japanese soldiers were shot before they realized the danger. Japanese machine gunners returned fire, but had difficulty aiming due to the holes being concealed by the black background of the characters.

====== Suicide Attack ======
Some Chinese sources report that during the height of the battle when a group of Japanese soldiers had attempted to plant explosives at the base of the West Wall and breach it, a 21-year old Chinese private named Chen Shusheng (陳樹生) strapped live grenades to himself and dove off the building into the Japanese squad, allegedly killing twenty Japanese soldiers in a suicide attack. Chen Shusheng's attack is absent from Yang Ruifu's memoirs, which only makes note of his soldiers throwing grenades and firing mortars from the rooftop. Chen Desong also makes no mention of the suicide bombing, only mentioning the throwing of grenades. However, in Li Chunlin's "Recalling the 'Isolated Soldiers of Sihang' in Shanghai," there was indeed a Chen Shusheng who carried out a suicide bombing against the Japanese army. Historian Stephen Robinson argues that account's accuracy was plausible, noting that the Chinese had used suicide attacks many times before during the Battle of Shanghai, such as the case of a soldier in the 36th Division destroying a Japanese tank with an explosive belt, killing himself in the process.

====== Evening attacks ======
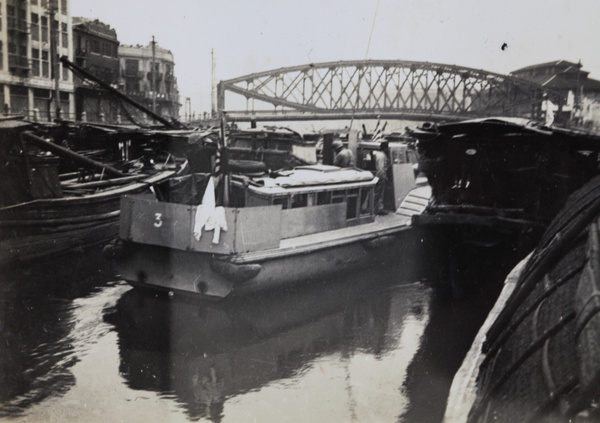
One of the Japanese armored pinnaces (boats) being stopped by the Chinese boom near the Zhejiang Bridge

At around 3 p.m., two Japanese pinnaces carrying some 30 marines attempted to flank the warehouse from the river, but were stopped by a makeshift boom fashioned out of Chinese junks at the Zhejiang (North Chekiang) Road Bridge. The Japanese claimed that they were heading up the creek to assist the Shanghai Fire Brigade, but were suspected by the British to attack on the Sihang Warehouse. British troops in the Settlement refused to move the boom due to the violation of the British Settlement sector, and escorted the Japanese sailors back at 4:30 p.m.

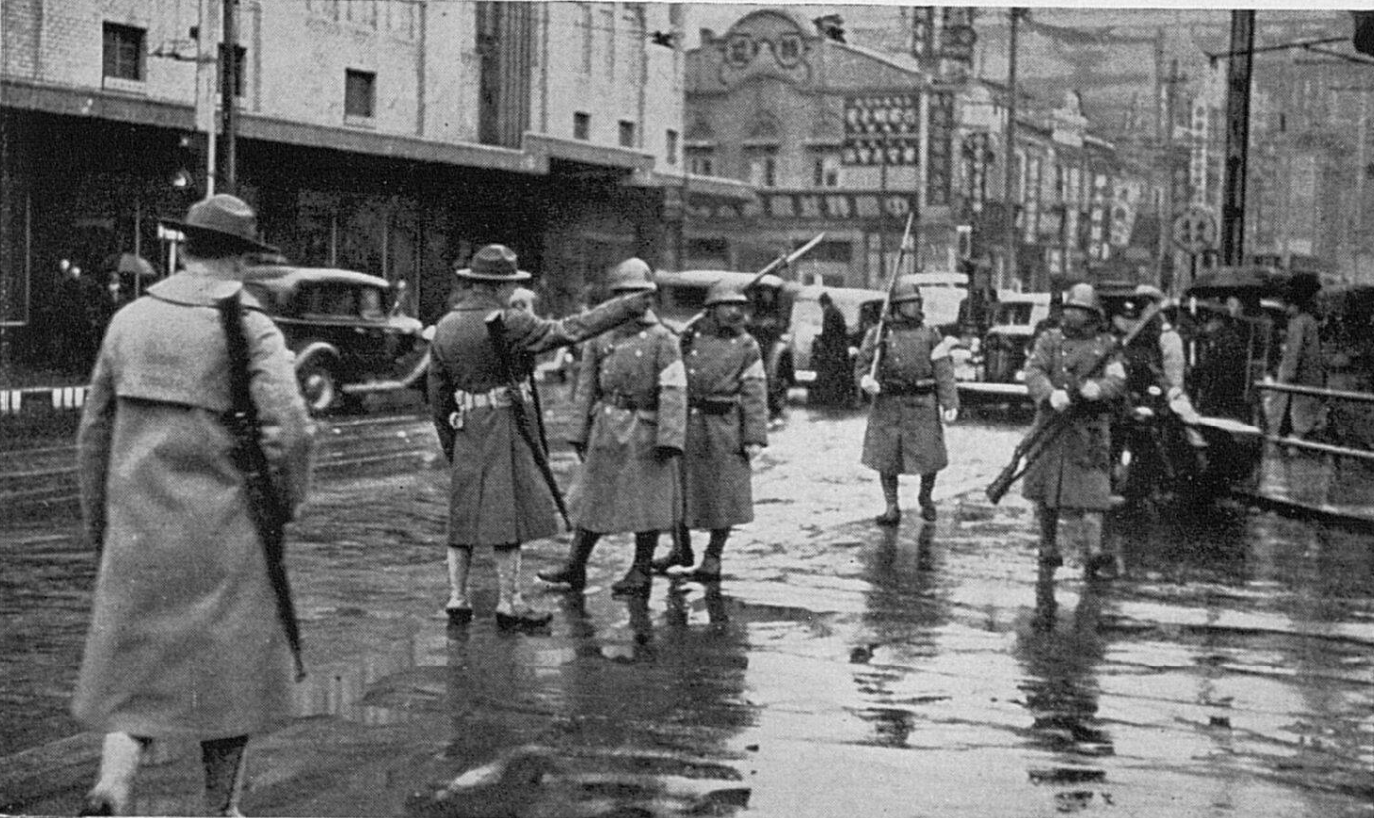
American marines confront a Japanese patrol in Shanghai, 1937. The International Settlement was considered a neutral zone on the Shanghai battlefield.

In the evening, according to Yang Ruifu, the Japanese launched a night attack using an excavator, and tried to dig a tunnel towards the warehouse in conjunction with tank assaults. During this day's battle, Chinese citizens across the river helped the soldiers by writing on large posters, warning of the Japanese army's movements.

==== October 30 ====
===== Renewed Japanese attacks =====
The Japanese launched a new wave of attacks at 7 a.m. on October 30. There were fewer infantry assaults at the warehouse this time; the Japanese attack was mainly concentrated artillery fire. Because of the sturdy construction and the abundance of sandbags and materials with which to fortify and mend the warehouse, the defenders were able to the repair the warehouse while the Japanese tried to destroy it. Artillery fire was so rapid that Yang Ruifu estimated there was approximately one shell every second.

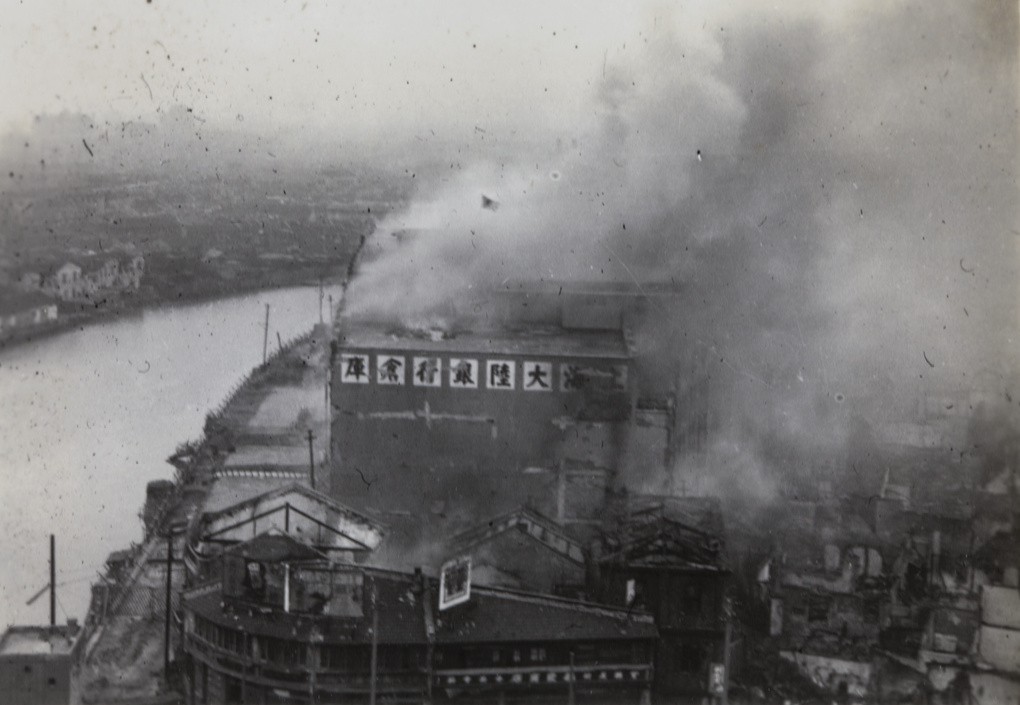
Sihang Warehouse burns during the Japanese artillery barrage, October 30 (Taken by Royal Welsh Fusilier John Montgomery)

Japanese shells created holes in the windowless western wall, which enabled Chinese defenders to return fire at Japanese positions. A western journalist witnessed the fighting and noted that a second Chinese flag had been hoisted above the roof alongside the original flag. Japanese machine guns continued to shoot at the walls and windows of the warehouse, whilst the Chinese defenders fired back with rifles.

According to a letter written by Xie Jinyuan to Soong Mei-Ling, the Chinese defenders had been harassed constantly by Japanese snipers, and Chinese casualties were rising after the Japanese began bombarding the warehouse with heavy artillery. Ricocheting shells and shrapnel caused a number of casualties among the defenders, with the warehouse walls inside showing signs of a potential collapse under the Japanese artillery.

Later that day on October 30, a Japanese naval officer announced at a press conference that the Japanese had made every effort to persuade the Chinese troops to surrender, but "all overtures tendered in a spirit of humanitarianism had been disregarded." Another Japanese military spokesman declared that "They must be destroyed," and another officer similarly stated "We will never let them escape alive." Rear Admiral Tadao Honda, a Japanese naval attaché, declared at a press conference that the Japanese would dislodge the Chinese from the warehouse, citing a "stout, stubborn refusal to surrender," further claiming that everything had been done to "spare the lives of the defenders in the true Samurai spirit, but we must make a final assault now."

===== Chinese decision to retreat =====
By this point in the battle, British and American officers had made multiple attempts to persuade the Chinese to leave the warehouse and accept internment. Major Harrison of the Royal Welsh Fusiliers declared that he had "offered to allow them sanctuary in the settlement provided that they laid down their arms," and stated "they replied that they preferred to die." A similar response was received by Brigadier General John Beaumont of the United States Marines stationed in the settlement, who upon offering the Chinese sanctuary, received the reply "Let the Japanese try to escort us to safety." In a dispatch to Colonel Alexander Telfer-Smollet, commander of the British forces, Xie declared that only Chiang Kai-Shek could order his battalion to leave.

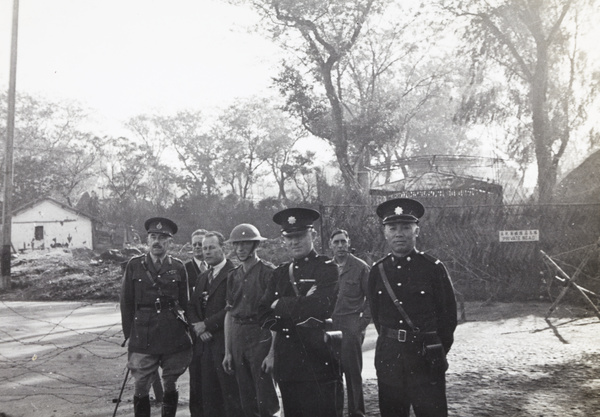
Major General Alexander Telfer-Smollett, who would conduct negotiations for the retreat, poses with British officials, soldiers and Shanghai Municipal Police. Mid-1937.

The foreigners in the concessions in Shanghai did not want the site of combat to be so close to them. With that consideration in mind, and faced with pressure from the Japanese, they agreed to try to convince the Chinese to cease resisting. On the 29th they submitted a petition to the Nationalist Government to stop the fighting "for humanitarian concerns."

Chiang Kai-Shek had received hundreds of telegrams urging him to save the battalion, as well as requests from Anglo-American commanders to not sacrifice his troops. By October 30, Chiang had decided that the 1st Battalion was "too valuable to spare," and because he considered the objectives of the defenders fulfilled, formally authorized a withdrawal through the 88th Division chief-of-staff officer Zhang Boting.

A meeting was arranged with the British general Telfer-Smollett through the commandant of Shanghai Auxiliary Police (上海警備), Yang Hu (楊虎), and it was decided the 524th would retreat to the foreign concessions and then rejoin the rest of the 88th Division, which had been fighting in west Shanghai. Yang Hu requested assistance from the British Army, to which Telfer-Smollett agreed.

When informed on his superior's decision over telephone, Xie disagreed, wishing to remain in the warehouse and fight to the last man. Only after an argument did Zhang Boting finally convince Xie to retreat.

===== Final Japanese assault on Sihang Warehouse =====
In the late night of October 30 at around 10 p.m., the Japanese moved their artillery even closer to the warehouse and intensified their bombardment of the building. Observers across the creek watched the Japanese batteries, four 75-mm guns, fire intense barrages, which were only broken by intermittent pauses during which a Japanese searchlight would move around the wall to inspect the damage. A Chinese soldier attempted to destroy the searchlight by hurling a hand grenade from a window, but it fell short.

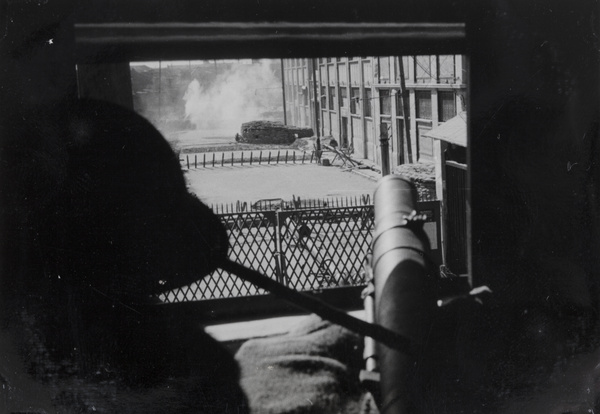
The southern wall of Sihang Warehouse as seen from Blockhouse F, occupied by British soldiers. One British silhouette is visible.

The Japanese bombardment became so intense that British soldiers on the Lese Bridge had to abandon their positions for their own safety. The Japanese also began to fire on the warehouse with heavy machine guns and hand grenades, scoring direct hits on the stronghold. Because the Japanese were firing towards the south, several shells missed and landed into the Settlement, one hitting the North-China Daily News building and injuring three Chinese civilians. A number of combat casualties was reported to have been sustained during the fighting in the early dawn, although a precise figure could not be calculated.

==== October 31 ====
===== Chinese retreat from Sihang Warehouse =====
As the Japanese barrage continued, the Chinese began their breakout near midnight. To reach the British settlement, the Chinese soldiers had to run across 20 yards over the New Lese Bridge whilst being exposed to Japanese fire. The Chinese planned to send the wounded first, followed by the 1st Company and Machine Gun Company in small groups under Xie Jinyuan, then by the 2nd and 3rd Companies under Yang Ruifu.

To cover the retreat, the Chinese formed a rearguard of a platoon from the 1st company along with some twenty-seven troops too heavily wounded to be moved easily; these men agreed to stay behind to man heavy machine guns and cover the remaining forces. During the retreat, Western journalists observed the Chinese rearguard exchanging gunfire with Japanese soldiers from seven "rifle-ports" in the Warehouse's west wall, occasionally throwing hand grenades at Japanese soldiers trying to approach and enter the building.

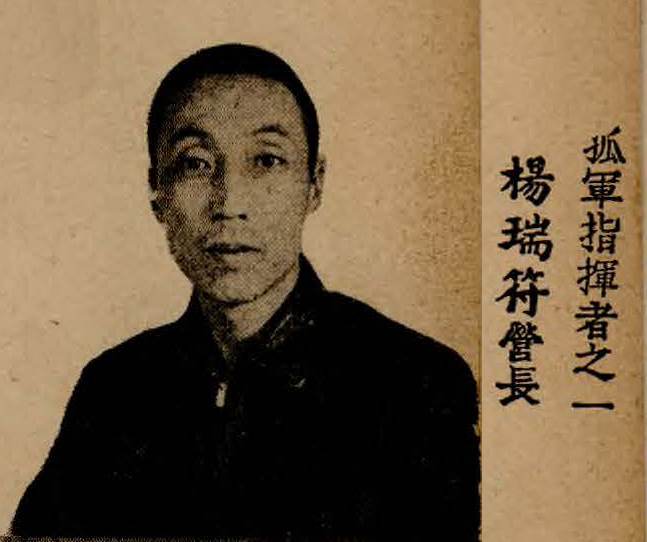
Major Yang Ruifu who played a major part in the Chinese defense. He was wounded in the leg during the retreat.

To conceal their movements, the Chinese defenders evacuated in a gradual manner, moving every now and then in groups of twos and threes or alone. Each time, a Japanese machine gun posted near the north end of the bridge would open fire. However, the darkness and extreme confusion near the warehouse meant only a few Chinese were hit before they reached the British lines. Among them was Yang Ruifu, who was shot through the left leg while crossing, but managed to limp the remaining distance on his good leg.

Upon reaching the International Settlement, the Chinese escapees were greeted by British soldiers who shook hands with them and congratulated their courage. Major-General Telfer-Smollett, the commander of the Royal Welsh Fusiliers at the bridge, received the Chinese soldiers and remarked that "I have never seen anything greater." Whether or not British soldiers opened fire in support of the Chinese retreat is unknown. British travellers W.H. Auden and Christopher Isherwood encountered rumors in 1938 of British troops returning fire against the Japanese, putting a machine gun out of action. Similarly, Zhang Boting and Major Shangguan Zhibiao claimed the British had assisted in eliminating one of the four Japanese machine guns near the North Railway Station. Stephen Robinson claims that British soldiers probably did open fire, citing their obvious sympathies with the Chinese defenders and their anger over the deaths of four Royal Ulster Riflemen killed by Japanese shelling two days prior.

As the Chinese escaped, a Japanese column headed by a tank attempted to cut off the retreat by blocking the road. Platoon commander Yang Yangzheng attacked the column with a machine gun, but was wounded when the tank fired a shell at him, destroying his left eye with shrapnel. Yang was then dragged half-conscious across the creek by his comrades.

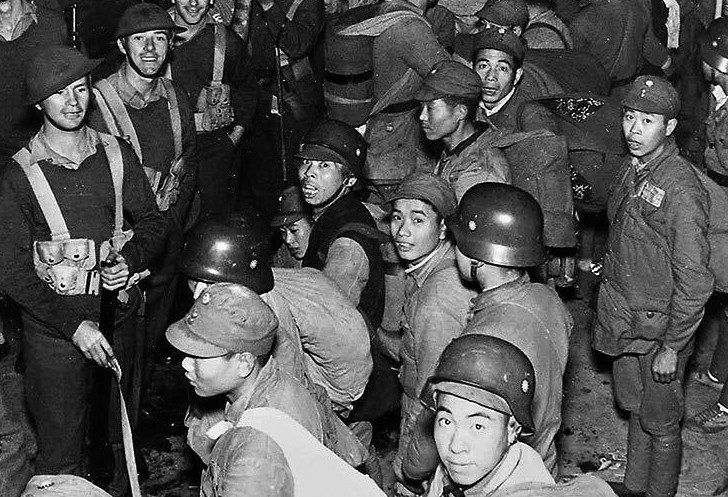
Soldiers of the 1st Battalion with British soldiers in the International Settlement following their retreat

By 2am, the last troops in Sihang Warehouse had retreated into the settlement safely, with dozens of wounded troops and Yang Huimin's flag being carried out along with 400 rifles, 24 light machine guns, 6 heavy machine guns and ammunition boxes, many of which were still hot from combat. Some 50 wounded Chinese soldiers were taken by British ambulances to various hospitals to be treated for their injuries including Yang Ruifu.

By this point in the battle, the warehouse had caught fire from the bombardment. A Japanese Special Naval Landing Party was subsequently reported to be in possession of the building.

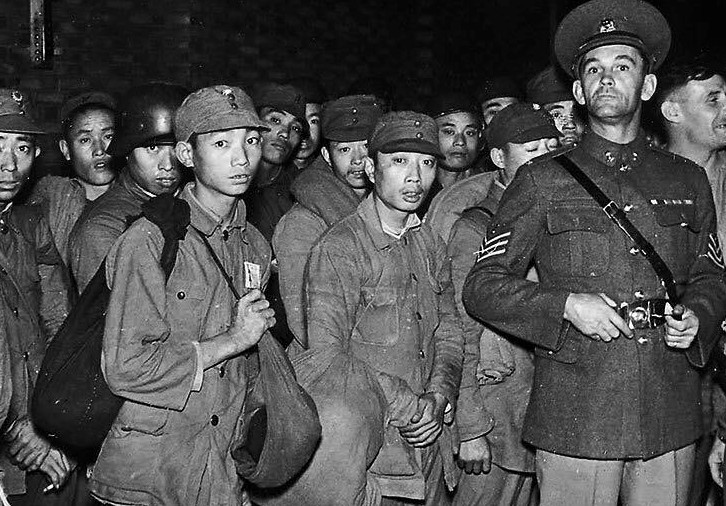
Men of the 1st Battalion in the Settlement

According to Western newspapers, the number of Chinese casualties during the retreat were estimated between two and six killed, and ten to twenty-four wounded. The American Consul General at Shanghai reported some 300 Chinese survivors had crossed to the British lines and laid down their arms and that several buildings in the downtown district were hit by Japanese shells during the fighting. Another western observer that 327 soldiers had escaped unhurt, another 28 wounded, claiming the survivors had stated they had left 100 comrades killed within the building.

However, the vast majority of the Chinese defenders had escaped alive, some 377 men and officers in total including both Xie Jinyuan and Yang Ruifu.

=== Japanese Accounts of Events ===
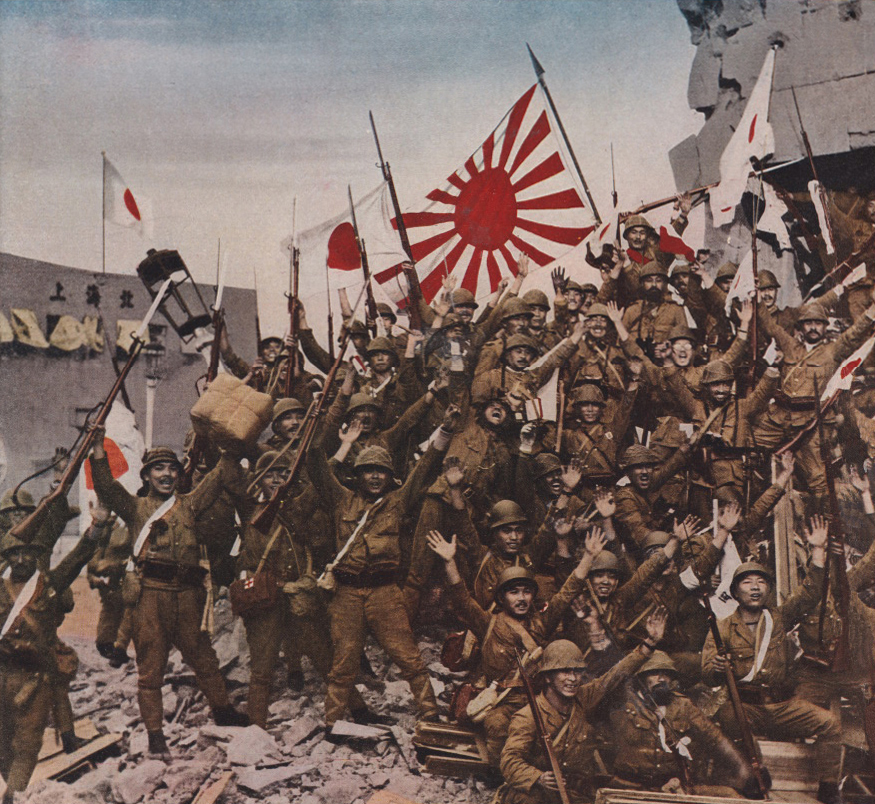
Troops of the Shanghai SNLF 10th Battalion "Haji Unit" celebrate outside of the Shanghai North Railway Station in Zhabei.

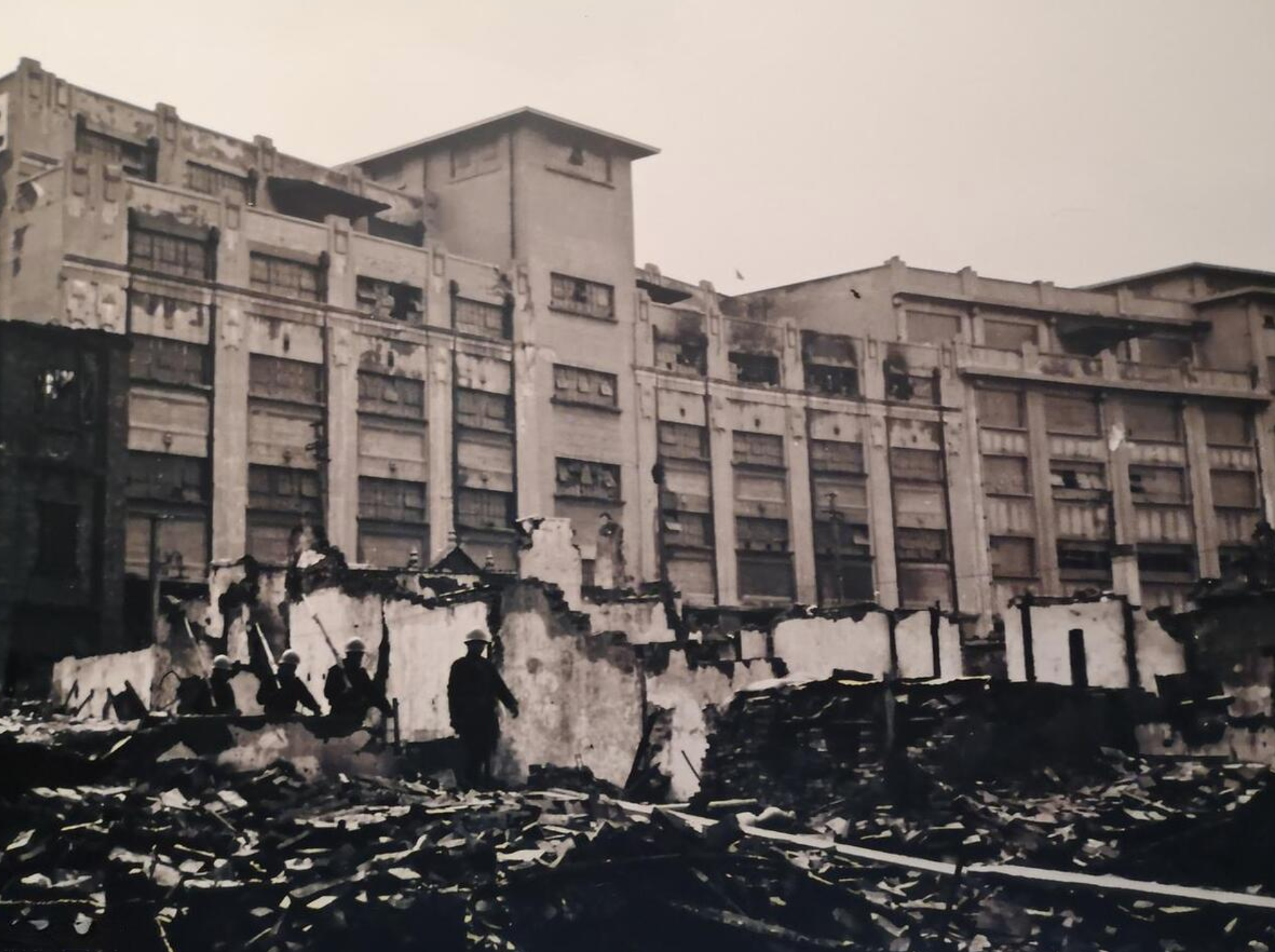
Japanese marines patrol the ruined area north of Sihang Warehouse.

At 5:05 AM on October 27, 1937, the Imperial Japanese Navy's Shanghai Special Naval Landing Force (Shanghai SNLF) ordered their forces to launch a general assault on Zhabei. The Shanghai SNLF moved quickly through Zhabei, with the Haji and Sano Units attacking the North Szechuan Road area. By 6:55 AM, Haji's men had succeeded in occupying the Pantheon Theatre and moved to capture the North Railway Station. The North Railway Station fell to the Naval Landing Forces at 7:20 AM, with the Japanese Naval Ensign hoisted atop the Railway Administration Bureau ten minutes later. At 9:20 AM, Haji and Sano's forces advanced into the Zhabei Pocket to sweep out remaining resistance.

By 3:30 PM, four troops from the Naval Landing Force's Kobayashi Company had become pinned down by a rainfall of Chinese grenades while attempting to clear the route to attack the Sihang Warehouse. After sustaining wounds from grenade shrapnel, the troops retreated into a trench. Kobayashi dispatched three more of his men to rescue the troops, who managed to evacuate their comrades to safety but suffered wounds as well. Company Commander Kobayashi himself was also seriously wounded by an enemy grenade while clearing out the Zhabei Pocket.

By around 6 PM Zhabei had largely fallen to the Japanese, with the exception of the Four Banks' Joint Warehouse (Sihang Warehouse), where the Shanghai SNLF reported approximately 800 enemy troops to still be held up at.

The Japanese initially advised the troops held up in Sihang Warehouse to surrender, but by the early hours of October 31 with their demands still unmet and signs of the defenders making an escape into the British defense sector of the International Settlement, the Japanese decided to attack the warehouse. On October 31 at 0115 hours the Imperial Japanese Navy confirmed sightings of Chinese troops evacuating into the International Settlement and began to bombard the warehouse with artillery fire thirty minutes later. At 0300 hours, SNLF troops stormed the Sihang Warehouse and within ten minutes had completely swept the warehouse of enemy troops and occupied the building. After securing the warehouse, the Imperial Japanese Navy reported roughly 80 corpses of fallen Chinese troops and a number of weapons to be inside.

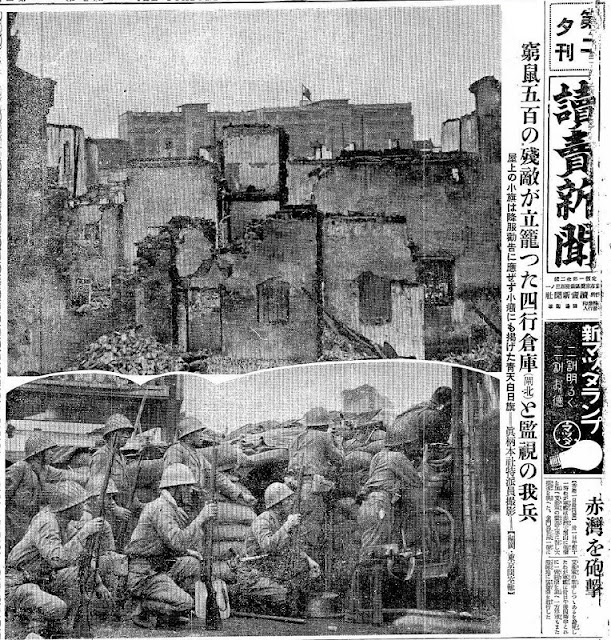
Two photos taken of Japanese forces positioned north of Sihang Warehouse. The Chinese flag is visible in the top, Japanese troops aim at the building in the bottom.

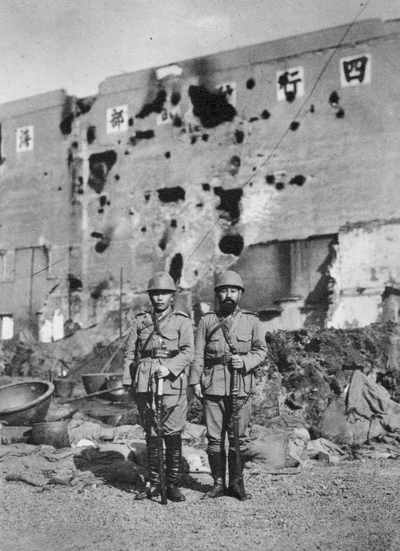
Commander of the Shanghai Special Naval Landing Force 10th Battalion Lieutenant-Commander Haji Kitaro and his adjutant outside of Sihang Warehouse, Shanghai, circa November 1937

== Casualties ==
=== Chinese Casualties ===
The Chinese casualties from the battle were disputed. Xie Jinyuan stated in an interview on November 2 that of the 410 defenders, 10 had been killed and 30 wounded, but later revised this figure to 420 defenders present with 10 killed and 37 wounded. Immediate newspapers claimed between 100 and 200 Chinese soldiers had been killed in the fighting.

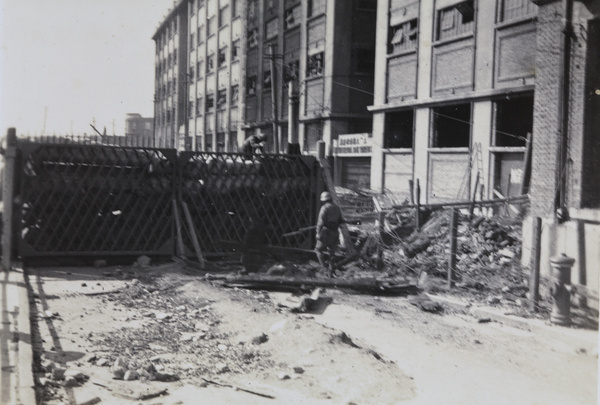
A Japanese marine stands guard outside the damaged Sihang Warehouse after its capture. Early November.

Stephen Robinson calculated that since 377 defenders had retreated (along with the 10 wounded men evacuated earlier), and some 420 defenders had been present, the Chinese "death toll was likely higher [than 10] though probably fewer than 50 men," with 33 men killed or missing from the battalion roster following the retreat. A similar figure is given by Micheal Clodfelter, who claims 34 Chinese soldiers were killed in action defending the Warehouse. According to 88th Division commander Sun Yuanliang's report on October 31, 1937, the battalion had suffered 89 casualties, including 35 killed and 54 wounded.

The Imperial Japanese Navy reported finding around 80 dead Chinese soldiers in the warehouse, but declared finding 100 corpses to the press. Japanese officials also publicly claimed some 700 bodies of Chinese soldiers were left in Zhabei, and that they had captured another 200 enemy troops whilst only suffering 10 wounded soldiers themselves in the entire battle. The same report claimed that Japanese forces were forced to execute some twenty Chinese prisoners in self-defense.

=== Japanese Casualties ===
Immediately after the retreat, Commander Xie reported to the Chinese newspaper Zhongyang Ribao that over 100 Japanese troops had been killed by his defenders. 88th Division commander Sun Yuanliang, who had subordinate officers present near the battle, stated that "enemy corpses in the vicinity of Sihang Warehouse totaled over two hundred approximately." with Xie Jimin giving the same figure, "more than 200 enemy troops were killed and countless ones were wounded. Two enemy tanks were also destroyed and two more were damaged. The number of enemies was the sum of the daily counts obtained by observation posts."

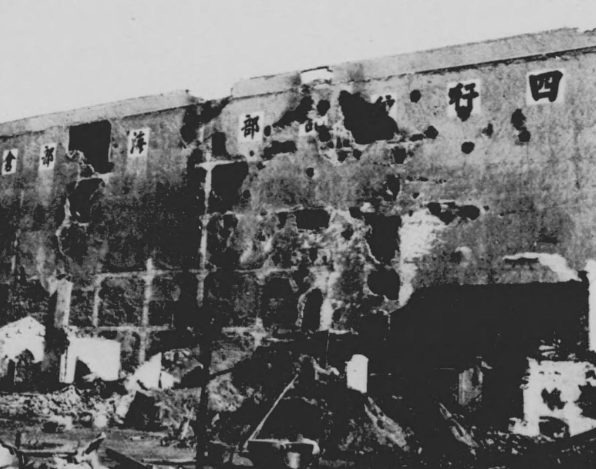
The damaged Sihang Warehouse following its capture by the Haji and Hayasaka Units of the Naval Landing Force.

Report of losses from Western sources vary, the Shanghai-based North China Herald made note of Japanese casualties, while others such as the November 2 edition of the West Australian newspaper—which used using mail received from employees on leave in Shanghai—reported the Japanese attackers had suffered heavy losses attempting to capture the warehouse, primarily from rifles, machine guns, grenades and mortars. The October 30 edition of the Mercury also reported that "many Japanese" had been killed in failed assaults on the fortified building. Australian military historian Stephen Robinson also writes that over 200 Japanese were killed in the fighting, of which the majority were suffered by the 3rd "Lucky" Division, with a handful of Japanese marines killed in the fighting.

Relevant records from the Imperial Japanese Navy reported a total of forty-two wounded amongst the SNLF during the advance on Zhabei from October 27 to 31, of which three were fatally wounded, including sailors Kitadani and Onuki and Warrant Officer Tanaka. Within this figure, four sustained their injuries during the final assault on Sihang Warehouse on October 31. One of them, Warrant Officer Tanaka, was shot outside of the warehouse by a Chinese machine gunner during the retreat on October 30 later died from his injuries on November 2, 1937. Tanks and armored cars from the Special Naval Landing Force's Armored Unit were recorded as participating in the advance on Zhabei but not on the assault on Sihang Warehouse. The commander of the Armored Unit, Lieutenant Yoshino Shozo noted in his memoirs that his unit advanced to Zhenru Station during the Zhabei Offensive and does not mention damage to or losses of any of their tanks and armored vehicles at Sihang Warehouse.

== Aftermath ==
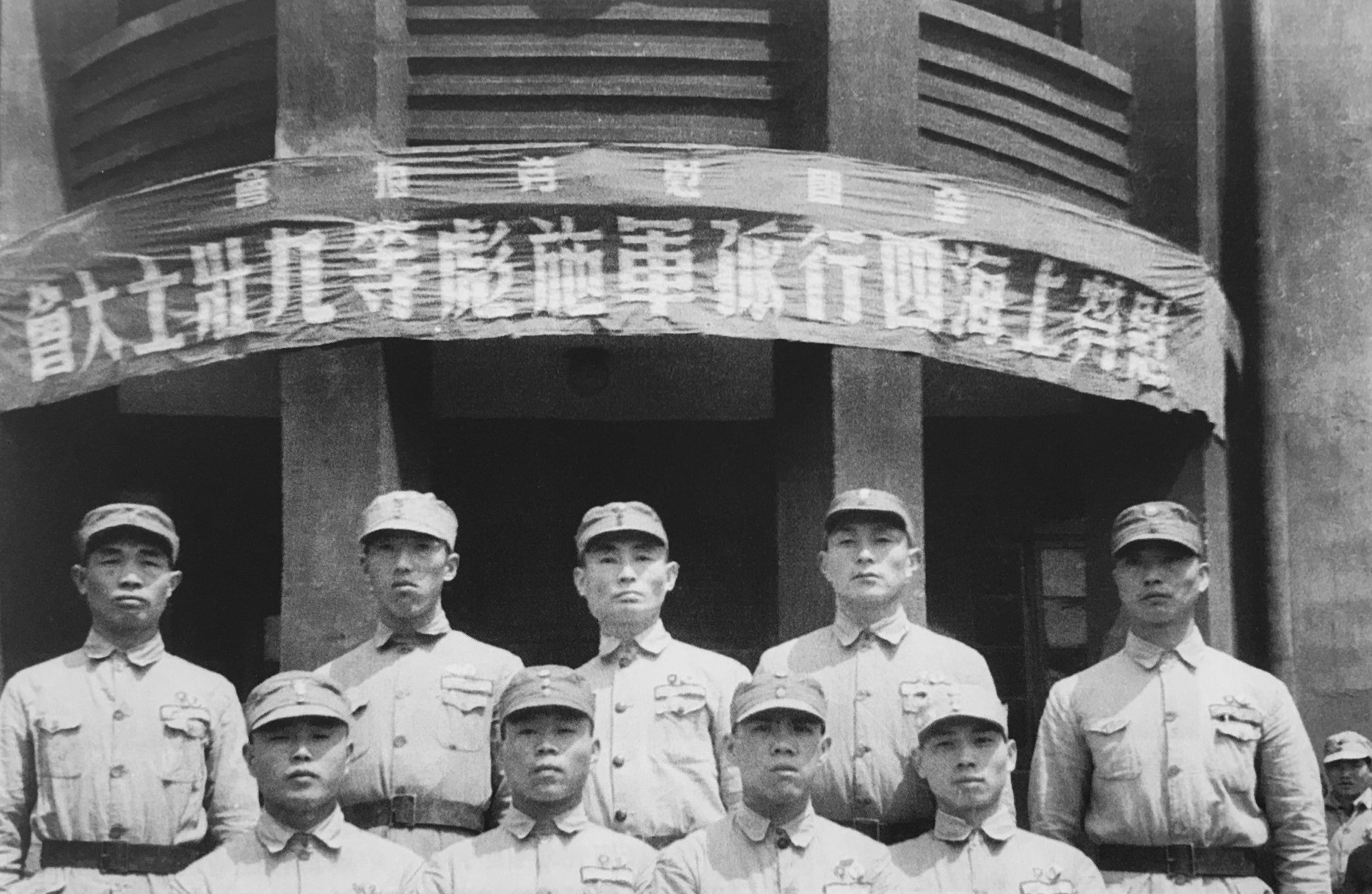
Nine men and officers of the 1st Battalion photographed in Chongqing, after their escape via Nanjing. 1943.

Chiang Kai-shek promoted every defender by a rank and awarded Xie Jinyuan and Yang Ruifu the Order of Blue Sky and White Sun. Major Yang Ruifu was wounded and hospitalized during the retreat. Thus, he was allowed to leave the camp and returned to the Chinese army, assigned to another position.

From November 1, 1937, until December 18, 1941, the soldiers of the Chinese battalion were held in the British concession, during which they received many visits from the citizens of Shanghai. On the morning of August 11, 1938, to commemorate the day the 88th division's march from Wuxi to Shanghai, the battalion raised the national flag in spite of the head of the British concession who had forbidden the flying of the flag in fear the Japanese army might see it. The Shanghai Municipal Council quickly sent in 300 British soldiers to surround the camp and 400 Italian soldiers to spread out along Jinyuan Road for security. A team of White Russian soldiers also rushed into the camp and fired machine guns at the unarmed battalion, killing 4 and injuring another 11. The White Russian soldiers then withdrew. At night on the same day, another team of White Russian soldiers forced the Chinese soldiers into several ambulances and imprisoned them in the Central Bank at The Bund. Citizens of Shanghai went on a strike for three days to demand the battalion be returned to the camp at the Jinyuan Road. The Shanghai Municipal Council had no choice but to agree. However, the flag was confiscated to ensure no such incident would happen again. On September 18, 1940, a sergeant of the Chinese battalion was shot dead and another private was wounded by a White Russian soldier guarding the camp due to tense situations. The perpetrator was sentenced to 15 years in prison.

On April 24, 1941, the officers and soldiers of the battalion were gathered at the courtyard for the usual morning exercise. Four of the men who had been bribed by Wang Jingwei’s collaborationist government took the opportunity to assassinate Colonel Xie Jinyuan, stabbing him at his vital spots. Regimental attaché Shangguan Zhibiao rushed to rescue the colonel but was also seriously injured. All four men were caught and sent to the concession authorities for trial. After Colonel Xie's death, as many as 250,000 Shanghai citizens visited the camp to pay tribute.

On December 8, 1941, the Japanese navy bombed Pearl Harbor and the Pacific War broke out. On December 28, the Japanese army broke into the camp and captured all the Chinese soldiers. The battalion was initially detained in Baoshan and forced to do hard labor. Because the battalion was not compliant, the Japanese army transported them to a prisoner camp in Nanjing. After hearing about the terrible conditions of the prisoners held there including live experiments and dissections conducted by the Japanese biological unit in Central China, 12 soldiers from the battalion attempted to escape the prison camp but were caught by the guards as they ran to the Zhonghua Gate. All 12 were bayonetted.

Eventually, the Japanese army began the process of separating the men. 50 were sent to the outside of Guanghua Gate (光華門), 60 were sent to Xiaolingwei, 100 were sent to Hangzhou, 50 were sent to Yuxikou (裕溪口), and another 50 were sent to the South Seas Mandate. The rest were still detained in the camp and forced to do hard labor. On November 6, 1942, most of the prisoners held outside Guanghua Gate escaped when they were exchanged with the prisoners at Xiaolingwei. They hid in Xiaomaoshan (小茅山) for several days. Some stayed to conduct guerilla warfare and some detoured through Zhejiang, Jiangxi, Hunan, and Guizhou to return to Chongqing. In most of the prisoner camps the men of the battalion were held in, the prisoners endured poor treatment which resulted in many deaths and there were sporadic cases of killings by the guards. Before the end of the war, many soldiers from the battalion were able to escape through different means.

After the war, more than 100 survivors from the battalion returned to Shanghai from all over China and Southeast Asia. Among them, there were 34 survivors who were sent to Papua New Guinea by the Japanese army for hard labor. Out of the original 50 soldiers of the battalion sent to the Rabaul prisoner camp, 14 died due to poor treatment and another 2 had to stay in Rabaul due to serious injuries. The remaining 34 were repatriated by the Australian government to Shanghai on August 24, 1946.

== Legacy ==
There is a lack of official archival materials and detailed battle reports regarding the battle of Sihang Warehouse from the Chinese side. The "History of the Anti-Japanese War: Battle of Shanghai" which recorded the battle from the Chinese army's perspective with detailed day-by-day battle progress had only a small passage for the battle of Sihang Warehouse. Chen Cheng's detailed 'Battlefield Diary of the Battle of Shanghai' made no mention of the battle.

In August 1985, Sihang Warehouse was designated as a cultural heritage site, and would be designated as such once more by the Shanghai Municipal Government in April 2014. Following renovations, on August 13, 2015, the Sihang Warehouse Memorial Museum was established in the western half of the building to commemorate the battle.

=== In film ===
In 2020, the Chinese historical war drama film The Eight Hundred, based on the battle, was released.

== Gallery ==
Sihang Warehouse from the other side of the Suzhou River. October 2006

The entrance. October 2007

A bust of Army Lieutenant Colonel Xie Jinyuan inside the entrance. October 2007

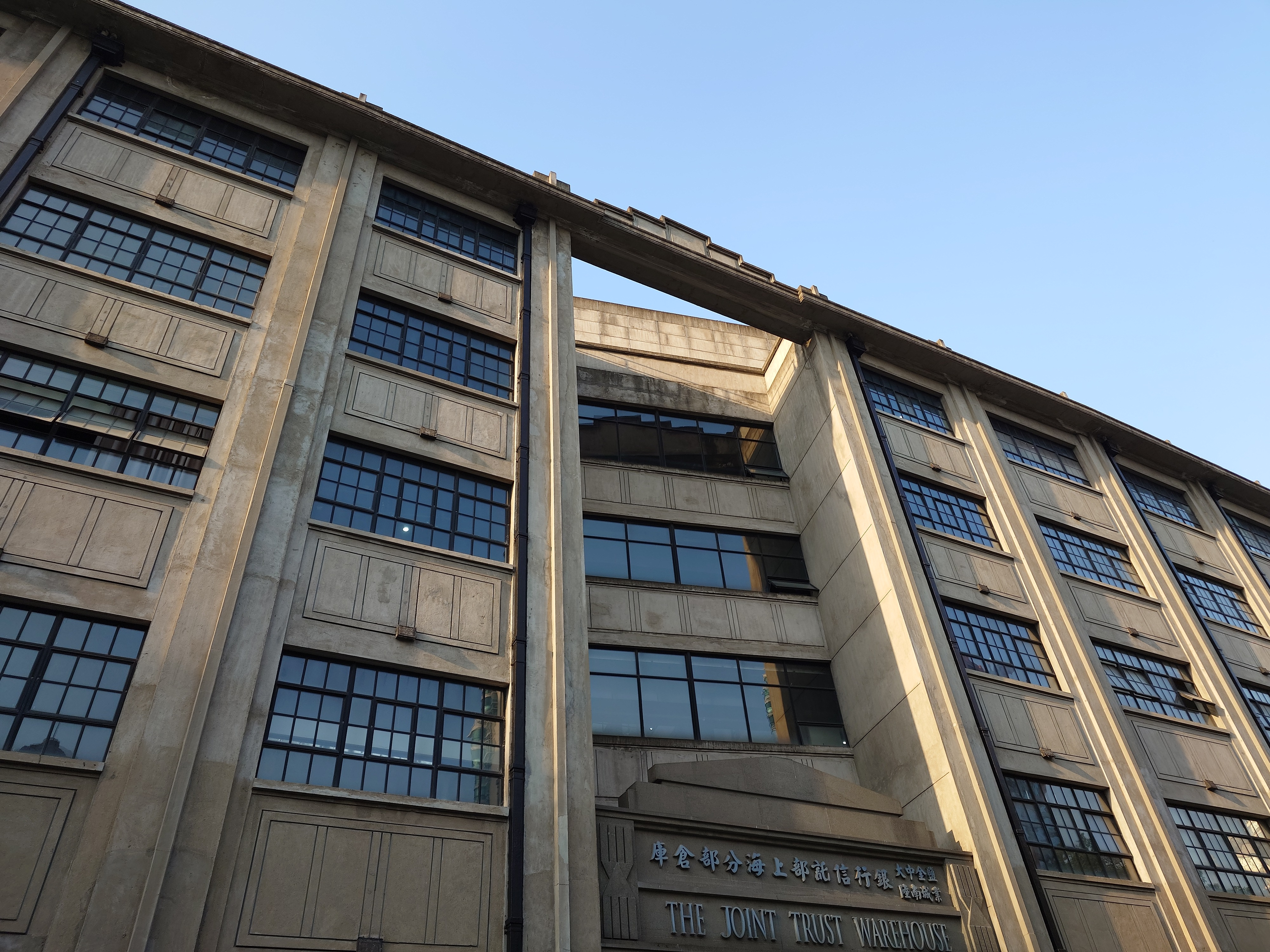
The restored Joint Trust Warehouse entrance in January 2026

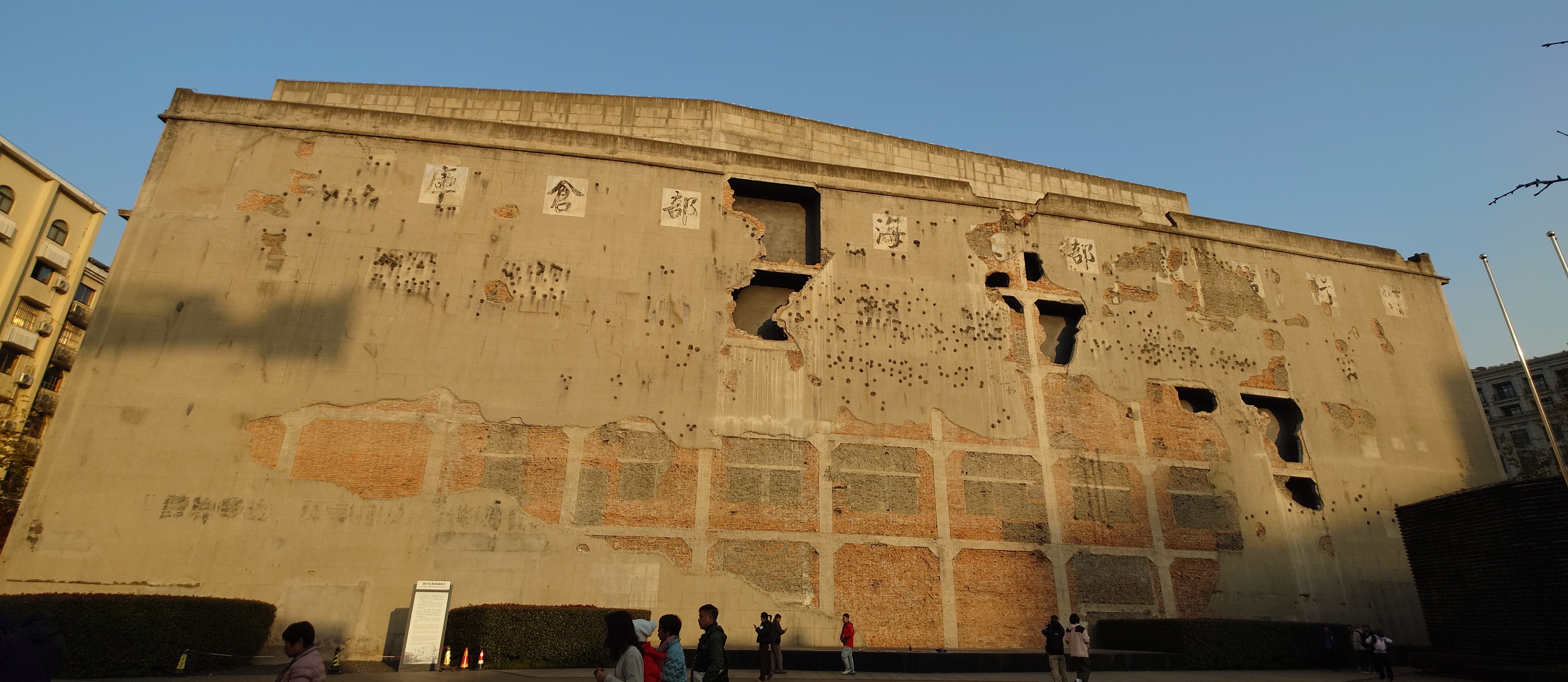
The side of the restored warehouse with extant artillery and bullet holes in January 2026
