= Xie Jinyuan =

Chinese general (1905–1941)

- 謝晉元
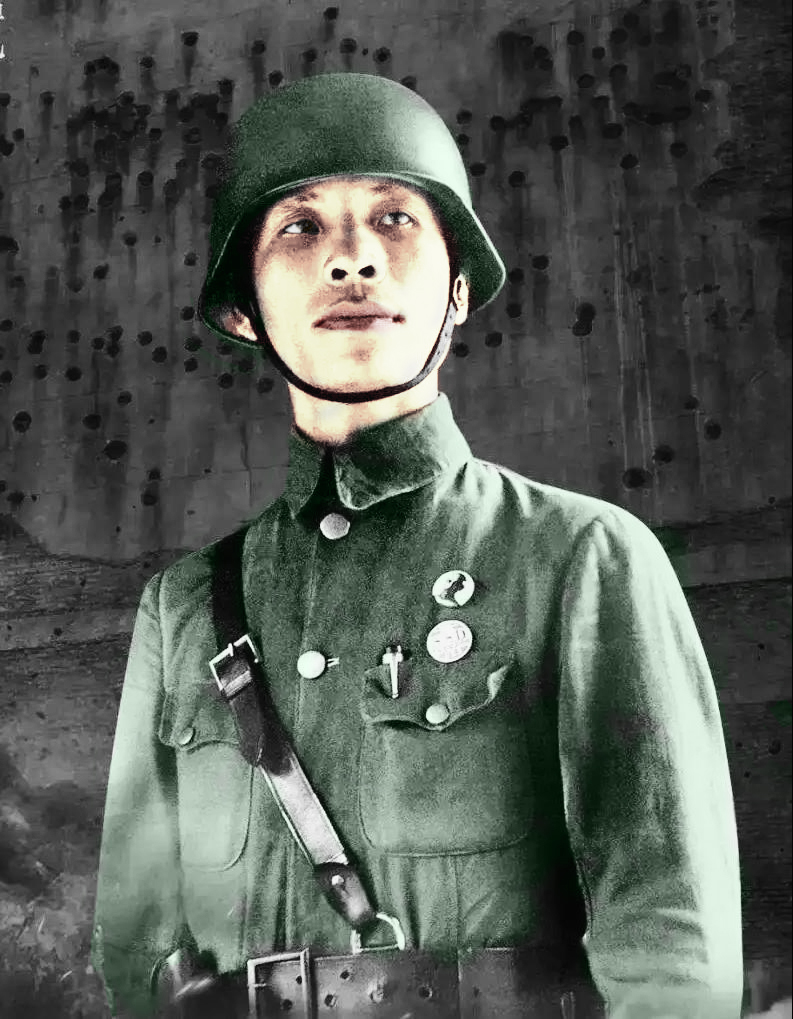
- Colorized Photo of Xie Jinyuan
- Born: 26 April 1905; Jiaoling County, Guangdong, Qing Empire
- Died: 24 April 1941 (aged 35); Shanghai International Settlement, Shanghai, China
- Education: Whampoa Military Academy
- Spouse: Ling Weicheng
- Children: 4
- Military career
- Allegiance: Republic of China
- Branch: National Revolutionary Army
- Service years: 1925–1941
- Rank: Colonel; Major general (posthumously)
- Commands: 5th Regiment, 2nd Division; 524th Regiment, 88th Division
- Conflicts: Second Sino-Japanese War †
- Awards: Order of Blue Sky and White Sun with Grand Cordon

Chinese name
- Traditional Chinese: 謝晉元
- Simplified Chinese: 谢晋元
Transcriptions
Standard Mandarin
- Hanyu Pinyin: Xiè Jìnyuán
- Wade–Giles: Hsieh^{4} Chin^{4}-yüan^{2}

Xie Jinyuan (Hsieh Chin-yuan; 26 April 1905 – 24 April 1941) was a Chinese National Revolutionary Army military officer famous for commanding the Defense of Sihang Warehouse during the Battle of Shanghai in the early phases of the Second Sino-Japanese War.

== Biography ==
Xie was born in Jiaoling County, Guangdong in 1905. He attended the Whampoa Military Academy in Guangzhou and graduated in 1926.

Xie saw combat against the Japanese during the January 28 incident and during the Northern Expedition. He later served as a battalion commander in the 88th Division's Reserve regiment and was promoted to Lieutenant Colonel.

=== Defense of the Sihang Warehouse ===
On 26 October 1937, as the Chinese defense of Zhabei faltered, Chiang Kai-shek wanted to withdraw all Chinese forces to defend the rural western regions of Shanghai and ordered acting commander of the 3rd Military Region Gu Zhutong to leave the 88th Division behind to cover their retreat. Gu was personally attached to the 88th Division and was vehemently against this plan, as was the division's commander Sun Yuanliang, who sent his chief of staff Zhang Baiting to Gu's headquarters to argue against it. However both hesitated to go against Chiang's orders; Sun instead suggested that the number of troops left behind to cover the withdrawal would not matter. He proposed (through Zhang) that a single regiment instead be left to defend one or two fortified regions, a plan Gu approved. Back at his own headquarters, however, Sun decided that a regiment would still be too many lives wasted and decided to instead order a single over-strength battalion - the 1st Battalion of the 524th Regiment, which had been reduced to 423 men - to defend the divisional headquarters at Sihang Warehouse instead. Xie Jinyuan, relatively new to the 88th, volunteered to lead the regiment, relieving Yang Ruifu of command on 26 October.

When he was transferred to the 524th Regiment, Xie was not familiar with any of the men under his command. He commanded the defense of the warehouse from 27 October til 1 November. Its proximity to the Shanghai International Settlement made it world-famous and brought the war between the Chinese and Japanese to the world's attention, if only briefly. During the defense, Girl Guide Yang Huimin secretly delivered a Republic of China flag to the defenders; when she asked what Xie's plans were, he replied, "Defend to the death!" Moved, she asked for a list of the names of the defenders to announce to the entire country. Xie realized that doing so would reveal to the Japanese (who had been fooled into thinking an entire regiment was stationed at the warehouse) their real strength. However, not wanting to disappoint Yang, he gave her the original roster of the 524th Regiment - 800 men, nearly double their actual strength. Thus the defenders of Sihang Warehouse became known as the Eight Hundred Heroes.

By 31 October the rest of the Chinese forces had retreated and been redeployed to defend more favorable areas. The nearby Shanghai International Settlement was concerned at the combat taking place so close to them and petitioned Chiang to stop the fighting. Chiang, who considered the fight already won, agreed to withdraw the 524th Regiment to the foreign concessions before regrouping with the rest of the 88th Division. On 1 November the 524th withdrew; in the defense of the Sihang Warehouse, Xie Jinyuan claimed to have lost 10 men killed and 37 wounded for over 200 Japanese killed.

However, when they retreated, British troops detained them; the Japanese had recriminations elsewise.

=== Imprisonment ===
Xie and the rest of the "Eight Hundred Heroes" were imprisoned in the Settlement for more than three years. During their incarceration, citizens of Shanghai often visited the troops, giving them performances and entertainment. The officers opened classes for the soldiers, teaching foreign languages, mathematics, and even Christian theology. Chen Wangdao, the Chinese translator of the Communist Manifesto, also visited the camp from time to time. The soldiers spent their days doing military drills. Their practice of singing the National Anthem of the Republic of China every day was continually disrupted by the foreign authorities, until it was violently put down by White Russian mercenaries.

The Japanese and Wang Jingwei's collaborationist government attempted to persuade Xie and the other prisoners to collaborate with them; the Japanese offered to allow the Settlement to free the prisoners on the condition that they disarm and leave Shanghai as refugees, but Xie refused. When Wang invited him to be the chief of staff for his army, he refused as well, stating "my parents are Chinese and their son also is Chinese. Chinese people are never slaves."

== Death ==
On the morning of 24 April 1941, Xie was assassinated by Hao Dingcheng and three other soldiers who had been bribed by the collaborationist government. Ten thousand people turned up for his funeral and he was posthumously promoted to major general.

== Personal life ==
Xie married Ling Weicheng (凌維誠) in 1929, and had two sons and two daughters: Youmin (幼民), Jimin (繼民), Xuefen (雪芬) and Lanfen (蘭芬).

== Legacy ==
Xie Jinyuan's body was interred in a small garden along Singapore Road (now Yuyao Road) where his bunk used to be. In 1947 the Shanghai city government renamed Jiaoyuan Park, where the soldiers lived, to Jinyuan Park, and renamed an elementary school in the vicinity 12th District Jinyuan National Elementary School. The road to the west of the warehouse was renamed Jinyuan Road. His grave was destroyed by Red Guards during the Cultural Revolution.

On 16 April 1983, Xie's grave was moved to the International Cemetery. In the same year, the barracks area was rebuilt and named Jinyuan Alley. In March 1986 the city council of Xie's hometown, Jiaoling, Guangdong, set up a monument in his honour, and his alma mater Jiankeng Elementary School was renamed Jinyuan Elementary School.

In 2005, to celebrate the 60th anniversary of the Chinese victory in the Second Sino-Japanese War, as well as the Allied victory in World War II, China Telecom released a set of themed telephone cards. One card featured Sihang Warehouse and Xie Jinyuan.

== See also ==
- 800 Heroes Song
