= Yu Jishi =

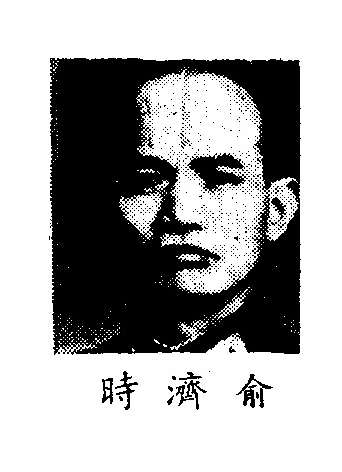
- Born: 1 May 1904; Fenghua, Zhejiang, China
- Died: 25 January 1990 (aged 85) Taipei, Taiwan
- Allegiance: Republic of China
- Branch: (Republic of China (1912–1949)) National Revolutionary Army
- Conflicts: Second Sino-Japanese War; Battle of Shanghai

Yu Jishi (traditional Chinese: 俞濟時; simplified Chinese: 俞济时; pinyin: Yú Jìshí; 1 May 1904 – 25 January 1990) was a Chinese Nationalist military general from Fenghua, Zhejiang. He graduated from Whampoa Military Academy.

In January 1935, when he was serving as commander of the 74th Army of the National Revolutionary Army, he ordered the execution of Li Chouxi.

He served with distinction during the Battle of Shanghai and was wounded leading a defense in battle. After the war, he retreated to Taiwan along with the Nationalist government and served with the defence ministry.
