= Guo Xiuyi =

Chinese painter (1911–2006)

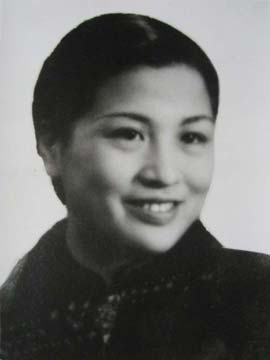
Photo portrait of Guo Xiuyi

Guo Xiuyi (2 May 1911 - 16 November 2006) was born in Shanghai, China. Her family originated from Zhongshan, Guangdong. Guo Xiuyi was a political and social activist. She married Huang Qixiang in 1934, a Chinese military commander and statesman. Guo Xiuyi was a disciple of Qi Baishi from, 1951- 1957, a renowned Chinese painter.

== Social & Political Activism ==
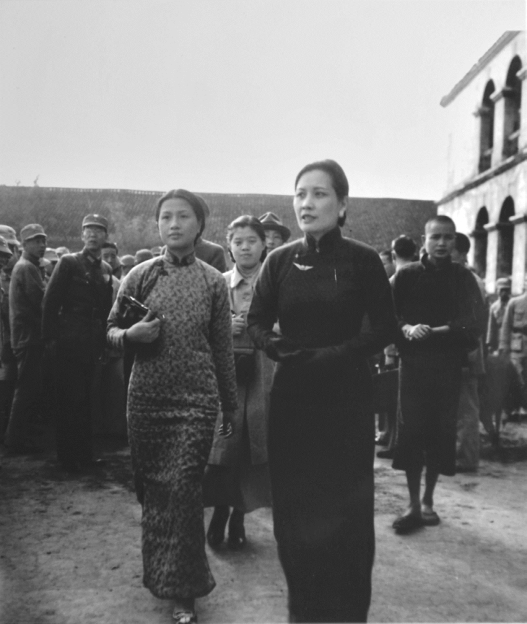
Guo Xiyu (second from the right in the front row), accompanied by Zhang Suwo and Soong Mei-ling, visit wounded soldiers on October 28th, 1939 at Hengyang Wharf

During the Second Sino-Japanese War, known as the War of Resistance against Japan in China, Guo Xiuyi served on the Standing Committee of the China War Time Children Care Association. This initiative provided resources, including shelter and education, for over 30,000 orphans of war. Both Guo Xiuyi and her husband were recognized for their outstanding efforts during the wartime with the Medal of Victory in the second Sino-Japanese war.

Guo Xiuyi belonged to the Standing Committee of the National Chinese People's Political Consultative Conference, following the founding of the People's Republic of China. Guo Xiuyi would go on to serve as an honorary deputy chairwoman of the Central Consultative and Control Committee of Chinese Peasants and Workers Democratic Party.

== Artistic career ==
Guo Xiuyi was an apprentice and disciple of Qi Baishi for six years starting in 1951. While Guo Xiuyi's works are strongly influenced by her education at the Qi School, Guo Xiuyi took inspiration from Pu Xuezhai and Wang Xuetao to synthesize her own unique style of painting. Her subjects included human figures, landscapes, animals, plants, and flowers. She is known for being able to bring life to her paintings. Guo Xiuyi would later serve as the vice president of the Beijing Research Society of Qi Baishi.
