= Jing County, Anhui =

Jingxian 泾县
- County
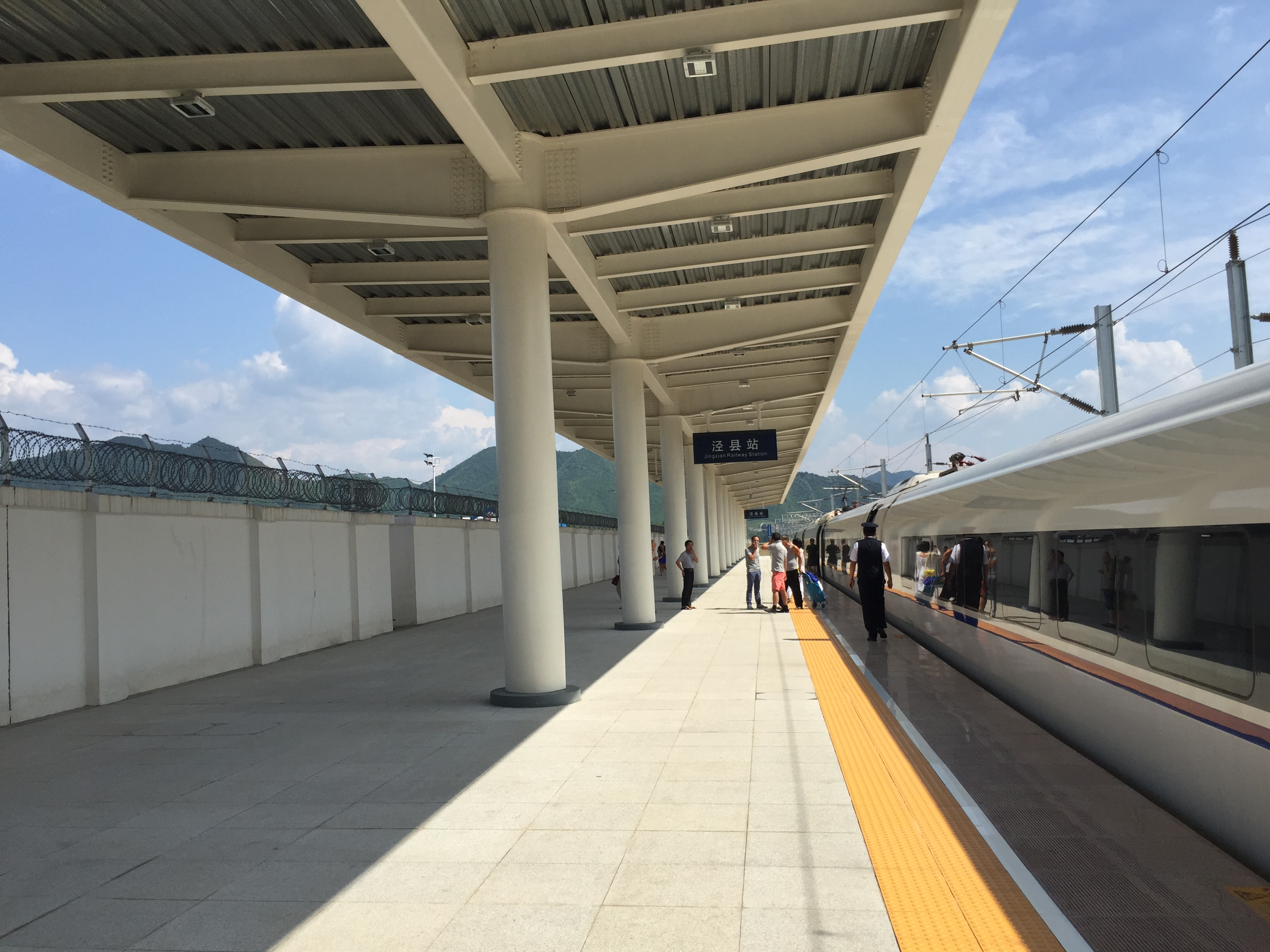
- Jingxian Railway Station

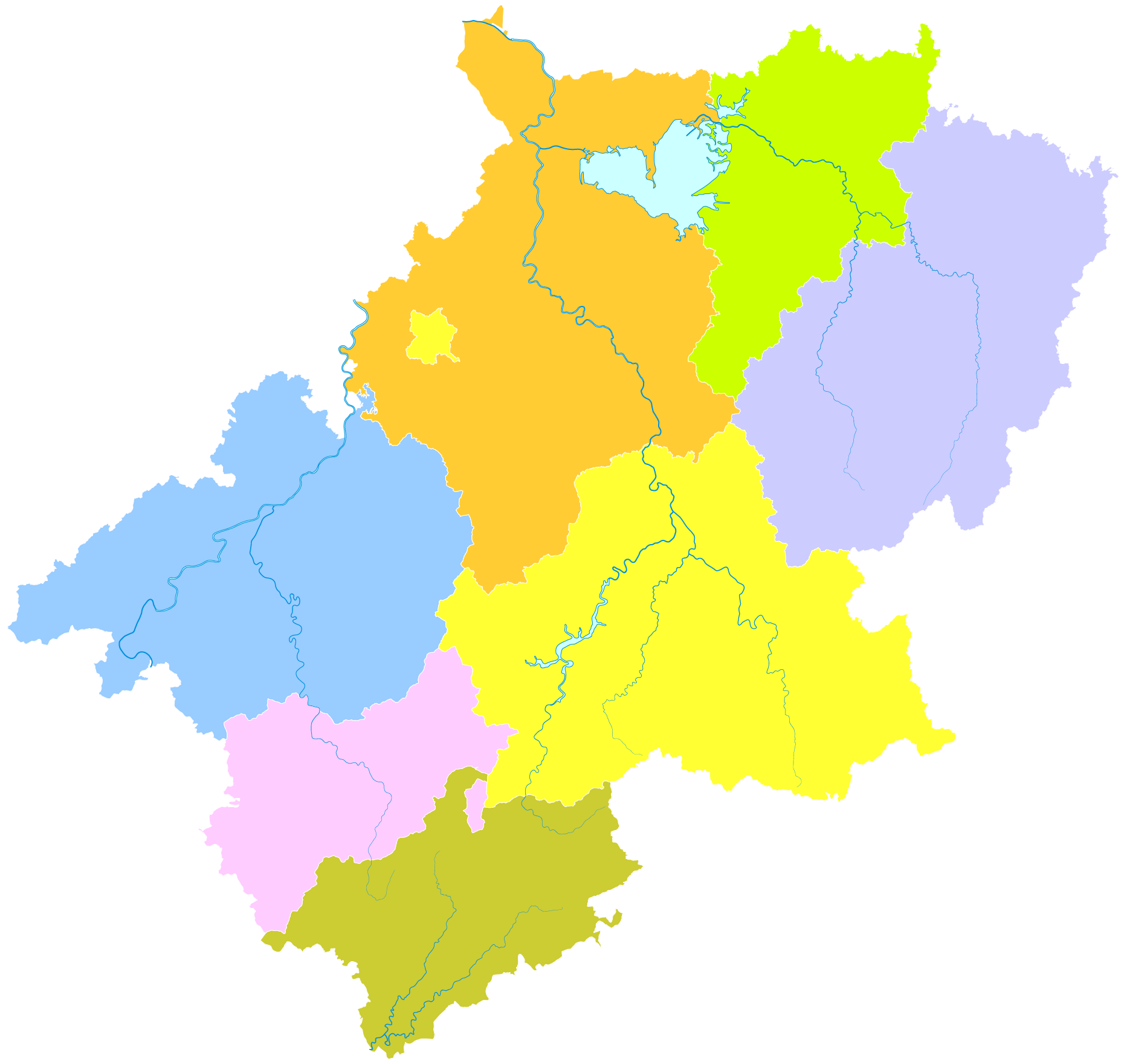
- Jing County is the westernmost division in this map of Xuancheng

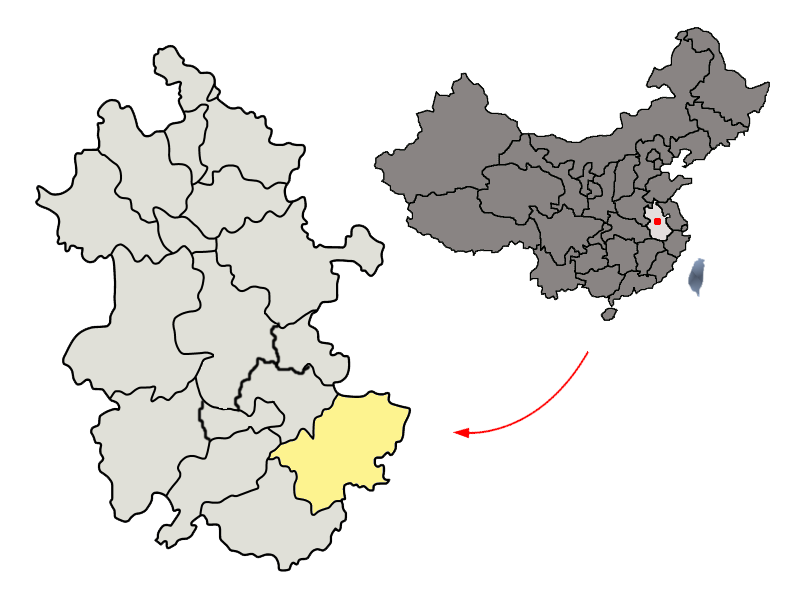
- Xuancheng in Anhui
- Coordinates: 30°41′19″N 118°25′12″E
- Country: People's Republic of China
- Province: Anhui
- Prefecture-level city: Xuancheng

Area
  - Total: 2,054.5 km^{2} (793.2 sq mi)

Population (2018)
  - Total: 307,000
  - Density: 149/km^{2} (387/sq mi)
- Time zone: UTC+8 (China Standard)
- Postal code: 242500

Jing County or Jingxian (simplified Chinese: 泾县; traditional Chinese: 涇縣; pinyin: Jīng Xiàn) is a county in the south of Anhui Province, People's Republic of China, under the jurisdiction of the prefecture-level city of Xuancheng. It has a population of 360,000 and an area of 2,059 km^{2} (795 sq mi). The government of Jing County is located in Jingchuan Town.

Jing County has jurisdiction over eleven towns and four townships.

The county is known for its production of Xuan paper and its historic villages.

== Administrative divisions ==
Jing County is divided to 7 towns and 2 townships.

Towns

- Maolin (茂林镇)
- Langqiao (榔桥镇)
- Huangcun (黄村镇)
- Dingjiaqiao (顶家桥镇)
- Jingchuan (泾川镇)
- Caicun (蔡村镇)
- Yunling (云岭镇)

Townships

- Changqiao Township (昌桥乡)
- Tingxi Township (汀溪乡)

== Climate ==
Climate data for Jingxian, elevation 57 m (187 ft), (1991–2020 normals, extremes 1981–2010)
Month	Jan	Feb	Mar	Apr	May	Jun	Jul	Aug	Sep	Oct	Nov	Dec	Year
Record high °C (°F)	25.8 (78.4)	29.4 (84.9)	35.0 (95.0)	35.0 (95.0)	37.0 (98.6)	38.7 (101.7)	41.2 (106.2)	40.0 (104.0)	39.4 (102.9)	34.6 (94.3)	30.3 (86.5)	24.9 (76.8)	41.2 (106.2)
Mean daily maximum °C (°F)	8.4 (47.1)	11.4 (52.5)	16.4 (61.5)	22.8 (73.0)	27.4 (81.3)	29.8 (85.6)	33.5 (92.3)	32.8 (91.0)	28.5 (83.3)	23.4 (74.1)	17.5 (63.5)	11.1 (52.0)	21.9 (71.4)
Daily mean °C (°F)	3.5 (38.3)	6.0 (42.8)	10.3 (50.5)	16.3 (61.3)	21.2 (70.2)	24.5 (76.1)	27.9 (82.2)	27.3 (81.1)	23.0 (73.4)	17.3 (63.1)	11.2 (52.2)	5.4 (41.7)	16.2 (61.1)
Mean daily minimum °C (°F)	0.1 (32.2)	2.2 (36.0)	6.1 (43.0)	11.6 (52.9)	16.6 (61.9)	20.7 (69.3)	23.9 (75.0)	23.6 (74.5)	19.3 (66.7)	13.1 (55.6)	7.1 (44.8)	1.5 (34.7)	12.1 (53.9)
Record low °C (°F)	−9.0 (15.8)	−10.8 (12.6)	−5.4 (22.3)	−0.2 (31.6)	6.7 (44.1)	11.3 (52.3)	17.7 (63.9)	16.0 (60.8)	8.6 (47.5)	0.9 (33.6)	−4.5 (23.9)	−15.4 (4.3)	−15.4 (4.3)
Average precipitation mm (inches)	84.0 (3.31)	87.5 (3.44)	138.9 (5.47)	137.4 (5.41)	160.0 (6.30)	260.0 (10.24)	221.2 (8.71)	176.4 (6.94)	99.1 (3.90)	74.0 (2.91)	73.5 (2.89)	55.9 (2.20)	1,567.9 (61.72)
Average precipitation days (≥ 0.1 mm)	12.7	12.8	15.1	13.9	14.1	15.1	14.1	14.7	10.9	9.5	10.8	10.1	153.8
Average snowy days	4.5	2.2	0.8	0	0	0	0	0	0	0	0.3	1.7	9.5
Average relative humidity (%)	80	78	77	76	78	83	81	82	82	81	81	78	80
Mean monthly sunshine hours	96.8	102.8	124.3	146.5	158.9	138.6	200.3	179.6	141.7	144.8	125.9	117.5	1,677.7
Percentage possible sunshine	30	33	33	38	37	33	47	44	39	41	40	37	38
Source: China Meteorological Administration

== Tourism ==
Tourist spots

Preservation of the county's historic villages has been challenging. According to a local official, "The key to preserving villages such as Chaji ... was to convince villagers to stay and not move away to work in the big cities." Tourist facilities for visitors to Chaji "have been built on the periphery of the ancient village to retain its pastoral landscape."

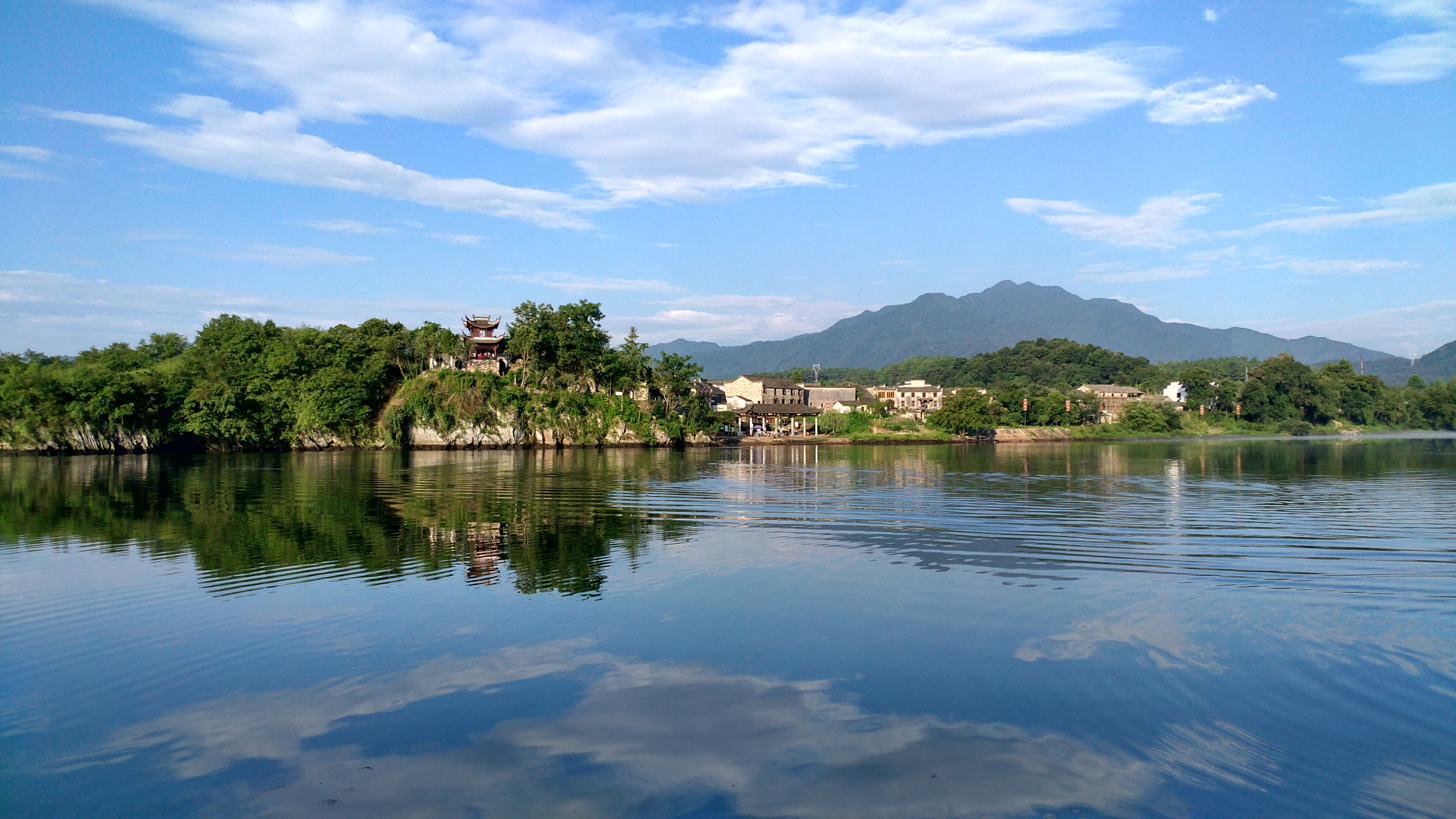
Taohuatan

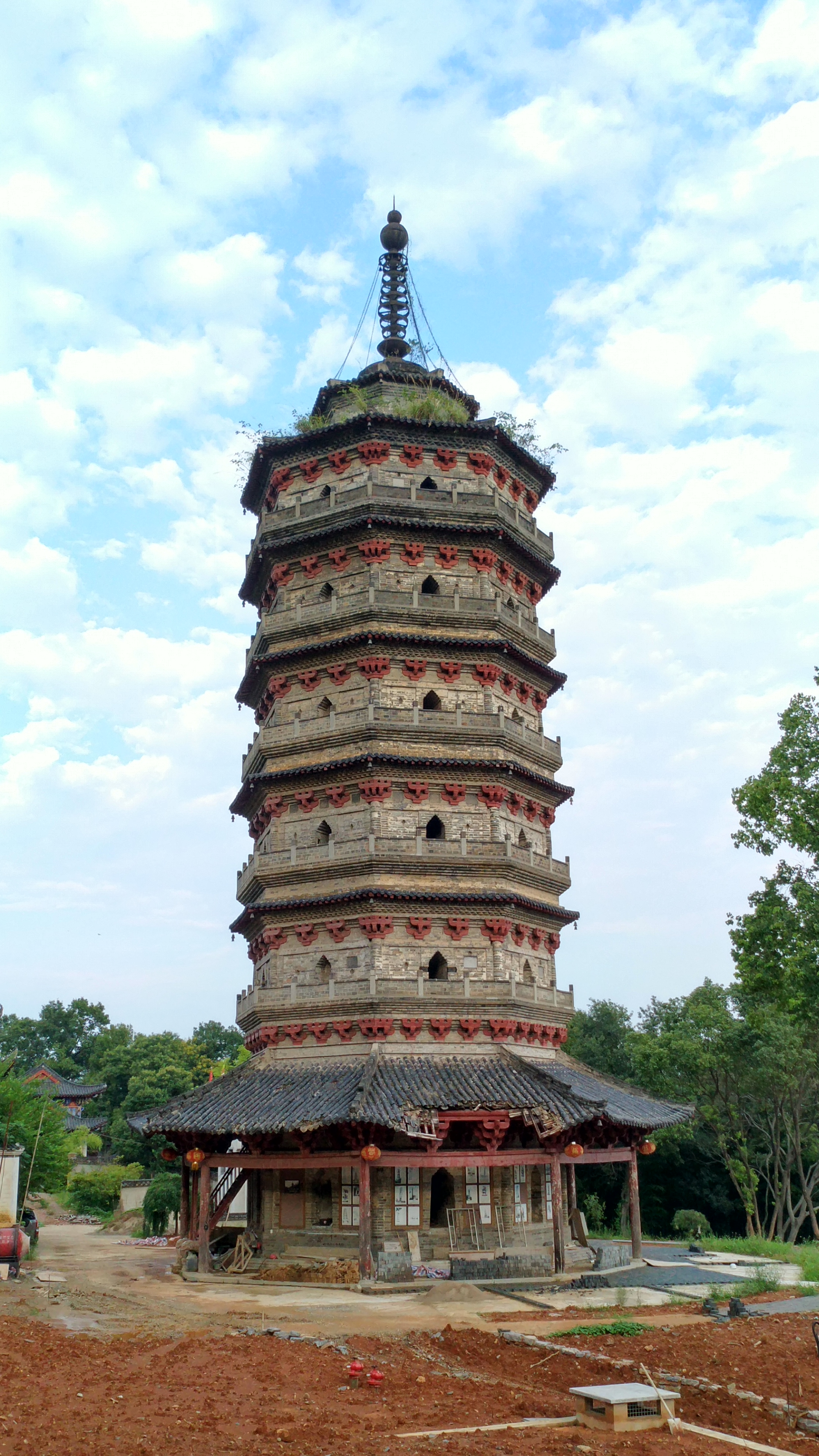
Daguan Pagoda

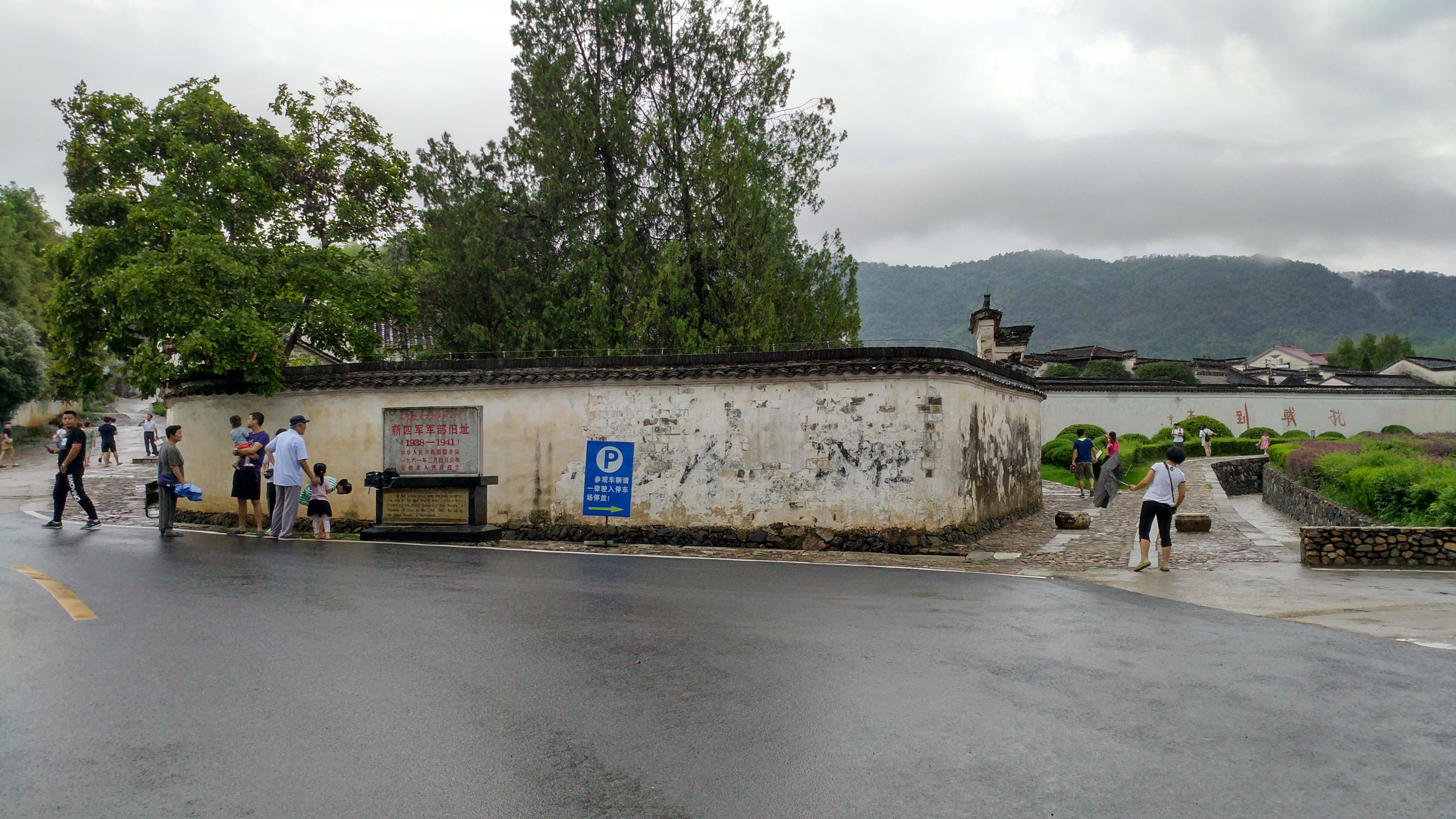
Former Headquarter of New Fourth Army in Jingxian

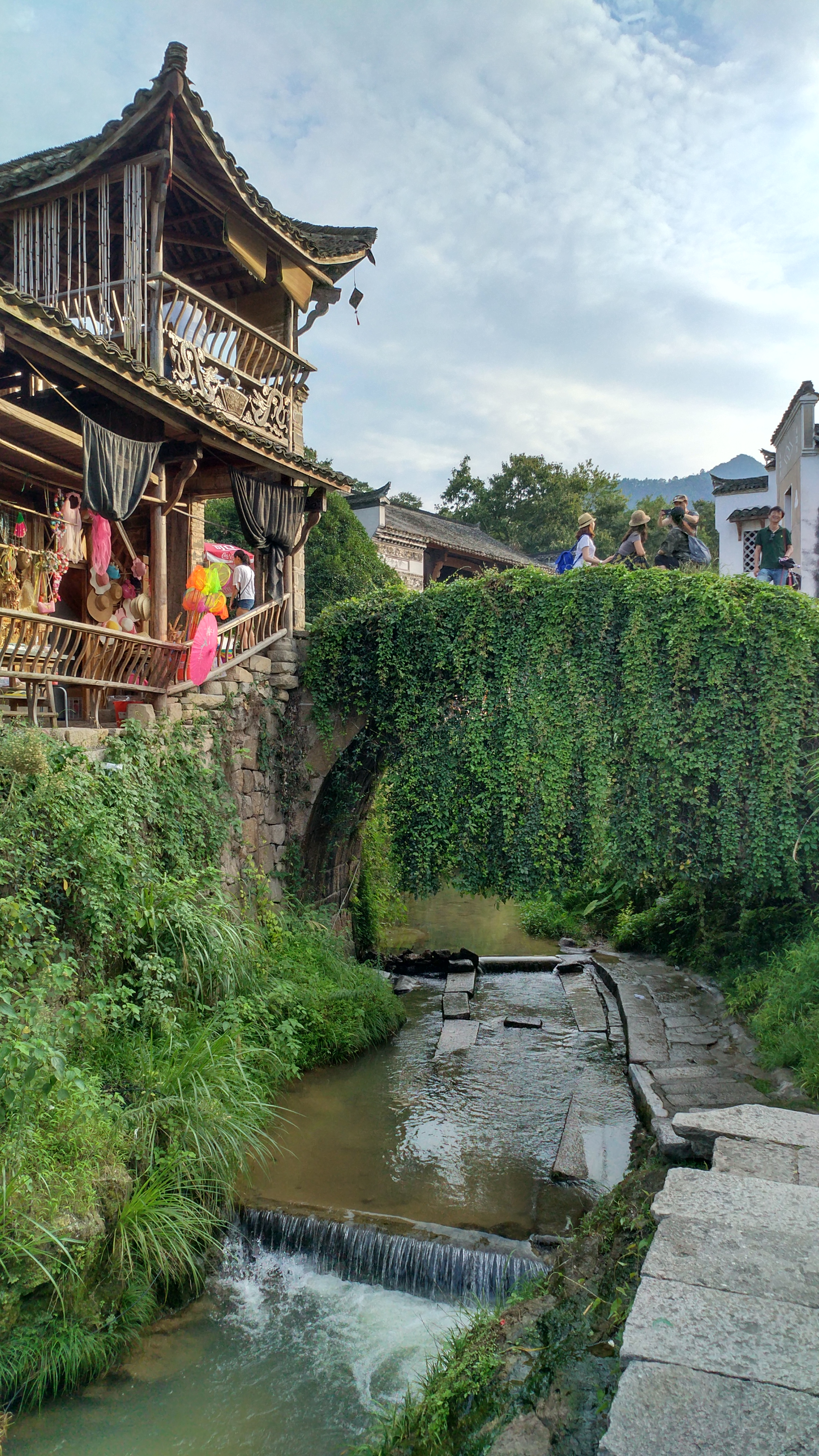
Zhaji Village

== Notable people ==
- Zhu Yongjun, academician of the Chinese Academy of Engineering.
