= Lingren Wangshi =

2005 book by Zhang Yihe

- Author: Zhang Yihe
- Language: Chinese
- Genre: Scar literature, Biography
- Publisher: Ming Pao Press (Hong Kong); Hunan wenyi chubanshe (China)
- Publication date: 2005
- Publication place: China

Lingren Wangshi (Chinese: 伶人往事; pinyin: Língrén Wǎngshì; lit. 'Past stories of (Chinese opera) actors'), also known as Past Stories of Beijing Opera Stars, Past Stories of Peking Opera Stars, and Recollections of Actors and Actresses, is a Chinese book on the later lives and sufferings of a group of renowned Peking Opera artists. It was written by Zhang Yihe and originally published by Ming Pao Press in Hong Kong in 2005. It was published by Hunan Literature and Art Press in Mainland China in October 2006.

Lingren Wangshi records the tragic experiences of eight Peking opera masters, namely Shang Xiaoyun, Yan Huizhu, Yang Baozhong, Ye Shenglan, Ye Shengchang, Xi Xiaobo, Ma Lianliang, and Cheng Yanqiu, during the Anti-Rightist Movement and the Cultural Revolution. The depictions of their unjust suffering and the destruction of their art resulted in this book's ban by China's General Administration of Press and Publication (GAPP) on 11 January 2007. In addition, Hunan Literature and Art Press was criticized by GAPP for publishing the book. Zhang started court actions in Beijing against the GAPP, claiming the ban "illegal".
