= Zhang Yihe =

Chinese writer and historian (born 1942)

Yihe Zhang
- 章诒和
- Born: September 6, 1942 (age 83); Chongqing, Sichuan, Republic of China
- Occupation: Writer
- Notable work: The Past is Not Like Smoke [往事并不如烟] Past Stories of Actors [伶人往事]
- Spouse: Liangyou Tang
- Relatives: Zhang Bojun (Father)

Zhang Yihe (Chinese: 章诒和; pinyin: Zhāng Yíhé, born 1942) is a Chinese writer, memoirist, and scholar of Peking opera and traditional Chinese theatre. She is best known for her vivid, memoir-style accounts of Chinese intellectuals and artists who suffered during the Anti-Rightist Campaign in the 1950s and the Cultural Revolution. As the daughter of prominent democratic politician and "Number One Rightist" Zhang Bojun, she herself was imprisoned for ten years during the Cultural Revolution. She is a graduate of the National Academy of Chinese Theatre Arts. She is the author of a memoir of mid-twentieth century intellectuals, politicians and literati, titled The Past is Not Like Smoke, and of Lingren Wangshi, a history of Peking opera stars. Her nonfiction works have been repeatedly banned in mainland China, and she has become a prominent critic of literary censorship.

== Life and career ==
Zhang Yihe was born on September 6, 1942, in Chongqing (then the wartime capital of the Republic of China). Her family originally came from Tongcheng (now part of Zongyang County), Anhui province. She is the second daughter of Zhang Bojun (1895–1969), a philosopher who studied in Germany, co-founder of the China Democratic League, and a senior official in the early People's Republic of China until he was labeled "China's Number One Rightist" in the 1957 Anti-Rightist Campaign.

Zhang attended Beijing Normal University Affiliated Girls' High School. In 1960, she entered the National Academy of Chinese Theatre Arts, where she studied playwriting and Peking opera. In 1963, she was sent down to work in an artistic administrative role with an opera troupe in Sichuan province — reportedly as punishment for a diary entry criticizing Jiang Qing (Mao's fourth wife) that referenced the saying "When one man achieves the Dao, his chickens and dogs ascend to heaven" (一人得道，鸡犬升天). In 1970, during the Cultural Revolution, Zhang was convicted of "counter-revolutionary" activities (partly linked to her family background and earlier criticisms). She was sentenced to twenty years of imprisonment and sent to a remote prison farm in Sichuan. She served approximately ten years before being rehabilitated and released in 1979.

Her experiences in prison later inspired a series of novellas based on the lives of fellow female inmates.

After rehabilitation, Zhang returned to Beijing and joined the Chinese National Academy of Arts, where she worked as a researcher and professor specializing in Peking opera and traditional theatre until her retirement in 2001 as professor emeritus. She then turned to full-time writing.

Her breakthrough book, The Past Is Not Like Smoke (往事并不如烟, 2004), offers intimate portraits of persecuted intellectuals including her father, Chu Anping, Kang Tongbi (daughter of Kang Youwei), Luo Longji, Shi Liang, and Zhang Boju. It became a bestseller but was soon banned in mainland China.

== Censorship ==
In January 2007, Wu Shulin, the deputy director of the General Administration of Press and Publications, had read out a list of books that "violated regulations." Zhang's Lingren Wangshi was third on the list. Wu told the publishers: "We have reminded you repeatedly about this person. Her books are not to be published ... you dared to publish it. This book is banned because of that person." The publishing house, Hunan Literature Publishers, was then punished.

This incident prompted Zhang to begin a campaign against China's book censor at the time, Long Xinmin, sending letters and petitions to the government and demanding a change in the way books are censored. In one open letter, titled "My Statement and Position," she writes: "I know -- in Mister Wu's eyes, Zhang Yihe is a rightist. Alright, so let us say that I am rightist. Then I ask: Is a rightist a citizen? In contemporary China, a rightist cannot speak or write? Everybody knows that as soon as there is a society, there will be leftists, centrists and rightists, of which the leftists will always be a minority. Does our country only allow leftists to speak and publish? Should the broad mass of centrists and rights shut up? If this is true, then we better immediately amend our constitution to state who is allowed to publish and enjoy the basic rights of citizenship; and who is not allowed to publish and cannot enjoy the basic rights of citizenship." Zhang also sought to overturn the ban by legal actions, and two Beijing courts had refused to accept her application.

Zhang's was one among eight books to be censored. Her previous two books, The Past is Not Like Smoke (also translated as The Past Has Not Gone Up in Smoke) and A Memoir of Ma Lianliang, were also banned for what South China Morning Post called "uncomfortable recollections of political campaigns."

== Body of Work ==
Having grown up in a family of intellectuals quintessential to the experience of the early years of the founding of the People's Republic of China, Zhang had first-hand access to the political and culture figures of the 1950s and 1960s. Her memoir-style work of the early 2000s—which differed considerably from the state-sanctioned, cathartic "scar literature' of the 1970s and 1980s—was groundbreaking is providing an objective expose of the "unimaginable cruelty and atrocity of political movements and the actions of the authorities who created the environment for the Red Guards and the Gang of Four to commit their crimes."

=== Works ===
Non-fiction

- The Past is Not Like Smoke (往事并不如烟, 2004)
- Lingren Wangshi (伶人往事, 2006/2007)
- Piano Four-Hands (四手联弹. co-authored with He Weifang, 2010)
- 五十年无祭而祭 - 序 (Editor and co-author, 2007)

Fiction

- The Liu Woman (刘氏女, 2011)
- The Yang Woman (杨氏女, 2012)
- The Zou Woman / The Zither (邹氏女, 2013)
- Red Peonies: Two Novellas of China (English translation, 2017)

=== The Past is Not Like Smoke ===
Zhang's works highlight episodes in which family members and friends are forced to betray one another in the name of revolution. In The Past is Not Like Smoke, for instance, Zhang tells the life stories of eight intellectuals and independent, democratic party members, and how they fell victim to Mao's leftist political campaigns from 1905s to 1970s. Characters include key players in the early establishment of the People's Republic, including Shi Liang, the minister of justice and deputy chairman of the standing committee of the National People's Congress; Chu Anping, editor-in-chief of the Guangming Daily; Pan Su and husband Zhang Boju (not to be confused with Zhang Yihe's father Zhang Bojun), a scholar and director of the Beijing Zhongshan Calligraphy and Painting Society; Kang Tongbi and Luo Yifeng, the daughter and granddaughter of the late-Qing reformist intellectual Kang Youwei; Nie Gannu, a renowned writer and member of the Chinese People's Political Consultative Conference; and Luo Longji, the minister of forestry and a member of the standing committee of the CPPCC.

Her writing "stresse[s] the importance of not allowing history to be forgotten, a deeply sensitive issue," according to Richard Spenser of The Telegraph. The banning of her book Lingren Wangshi inspired her response to the authorities.

Zhang has written commentaries on Ai Weiwei and many other issues of contemporary import.
