= Xuancheng =

City in Anhui, China

Xuancheng 宣城市 Suancheng
- Prefecture-level city
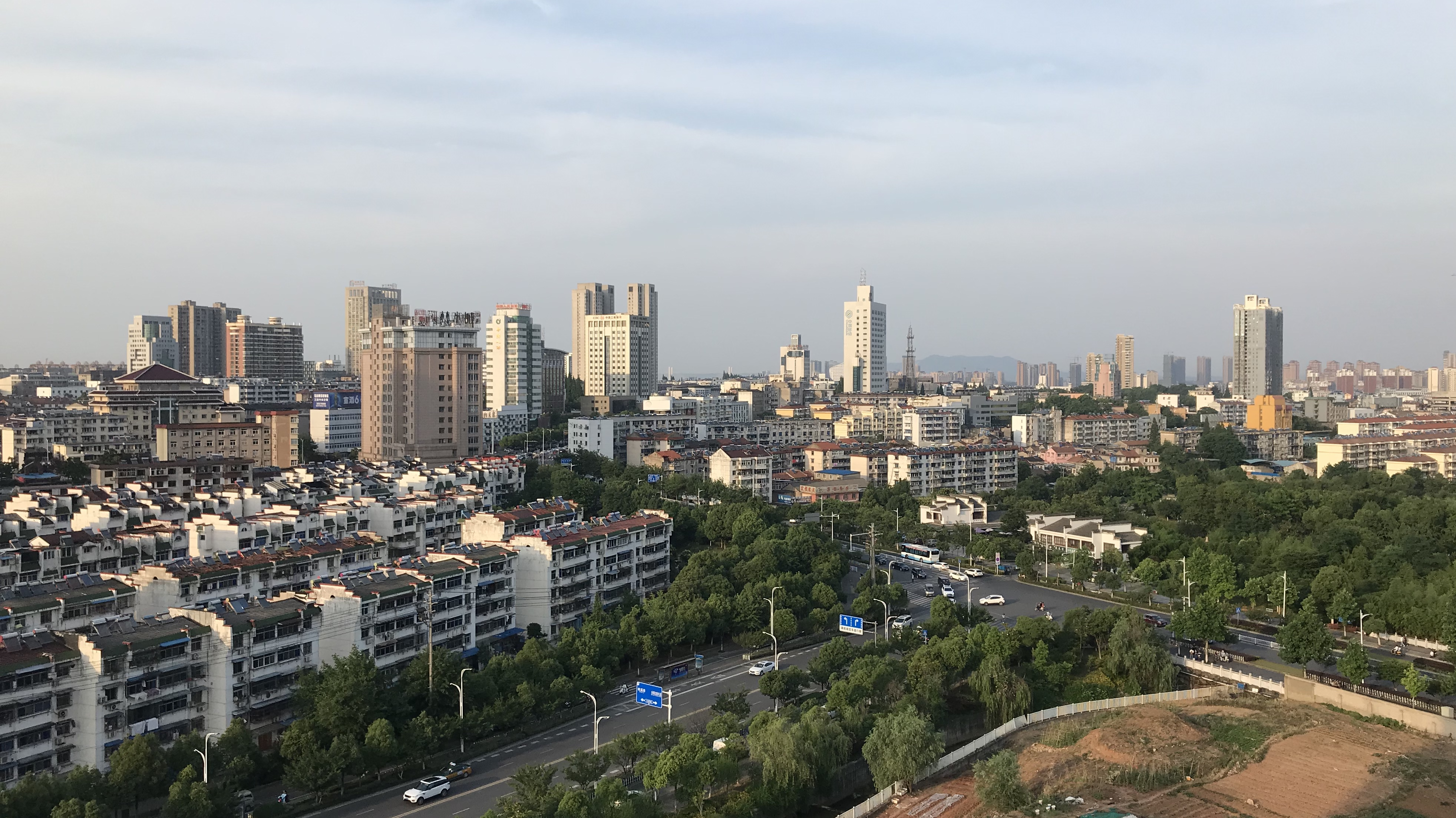

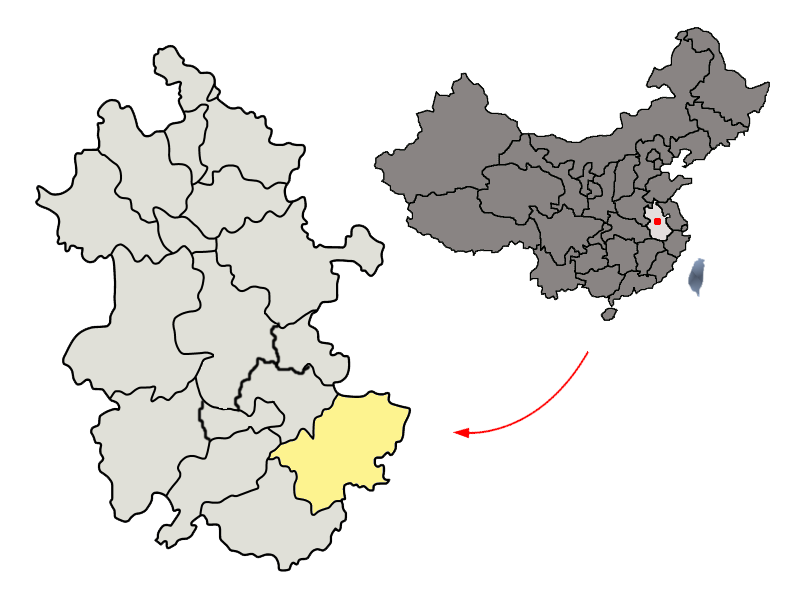
- Coordinates (Xuancheng municipal government): 30°56′20″N 118°45′32″E
- Country: People's Republic of China
- Province: Anhui
- County-level divisions: 7
- Township-level divisions: 115
- Settled: 109 BC
- Municipal seat: Xuanzhou District

Government
  - Mayor: Han Jun (韩军)

Area
  - Prefecture-level city: 12,313 km^{2} (4,754 sq mi)
  - Urban: 2,630 km^{2} (1,020 sq mi)
  - Metro: 2,630 km^{2} (1,020 sq mi)

Population (2020 census)
  - Prefecture-level city: 2,500,063
  - Density: 203.04/km^{2} (525.88/sq mi)
  - Urban: 774,332
  - Urban density: 294/km^{2} (763/sq mi)
  - Metro: 774,332
  - Metro density: 294/km^{2} (763/sq mi)

GDP
  - Prefecture-level city: CN¥ 183.4 billion US$ 23.1 billion
  - Per capita: CN¥ 73,740; US$ 11,430
- Time zone: UTC+8 (China Standard)
- Postal code: 242000
- Area code: 0563
- ISO 3166 code: CN-AH-18
- License Plate Prefix: 皖P
- Website: www.xuancheng.gov.cn

Xuancheng (Chinese: 宣城; pinyin: Xuānchéng; Xuanzhou Wu: Shye-san) is a city in the southeast of Anhui province. Archeological digs suggest that the city has been settled for over 4,000 years, and has been under formal administration since the Qin dynasty. Located in the lower Yangtze River drainage basin and Yangtze River Delta, it borders Wuhu to the northwest, Chizhou to the west, Huangshan to the southwest, and the coastal provinces of Zhejiang and Jiangsu to the southeast and northeast respectively.

== History ==
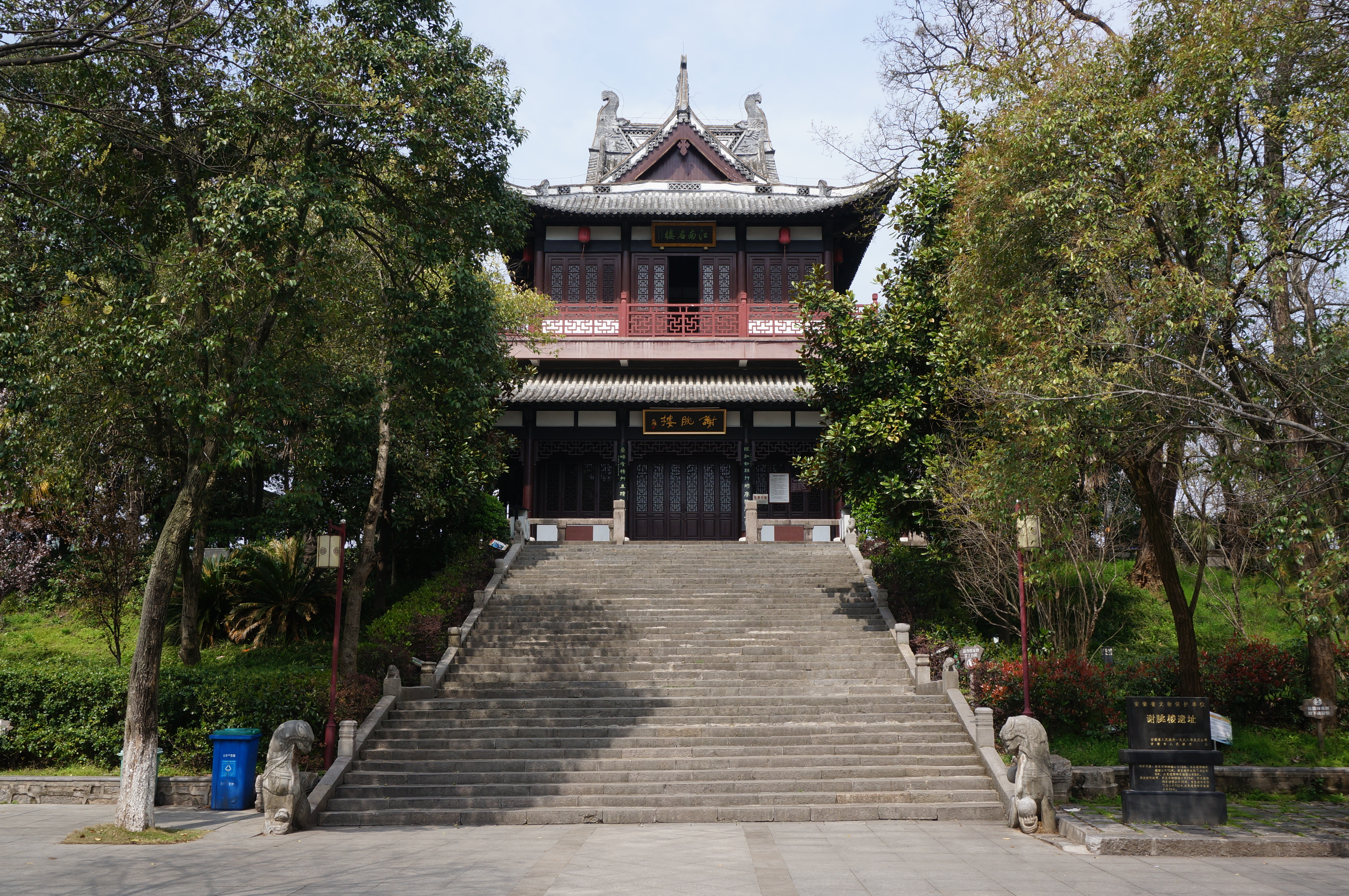
Xie Tiao Lou

Archeological digs in Xuancheng have found pottery and stoneware indicative of the Liangzhu Culture.

During the Spring and Autumn period, the area belonged to the State of Wu, although, upon the decline of Wu, the area was also ruled by the State of Chu and the State of Yue, respectively.

Under the Qin dynasty, the area was administered as Zhang Commandery (Chinese: 鄣郡), which became the Danyang Commandery in 109 BCE, under the Western Han dynasty. During the Danyang Commandery, Wanling (Chinese: 宛陵, presently Xuanzhou District, the site of the Xuancheng Municipal Government) served as the administrative center. Xuanzhou has been the political, economic and cultural center of administration since then. In 281 CE, Xuancheng Commandery was established.

Xuancheng became a prefecture-level city in 2000.

== Geography and Climate ==
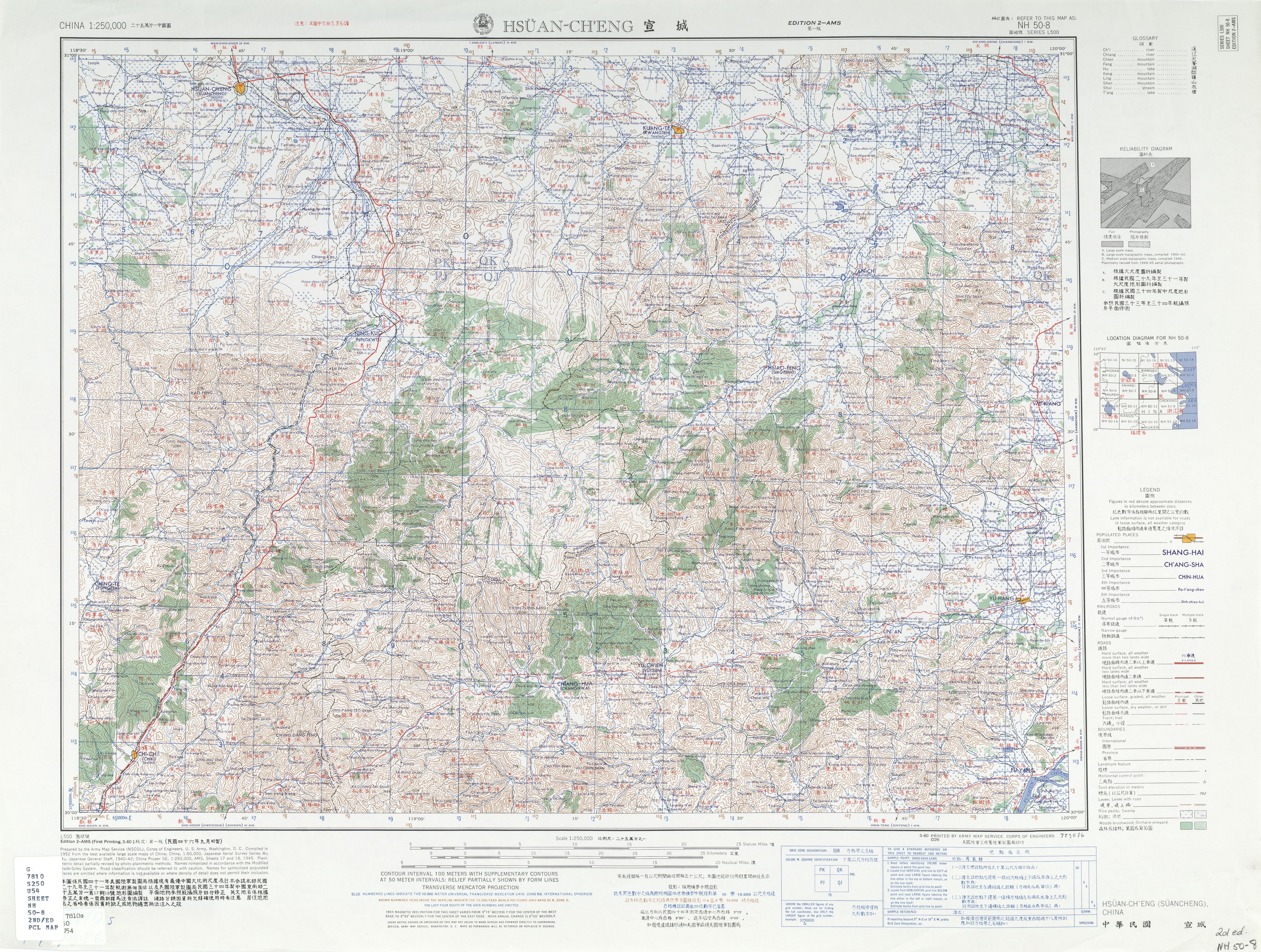
Map including Xuancheng (labeled as HSÜAN-CH'ENG (SÜAN-CHENG) (walled) 宣城) (AMS, 1952)

Its terrain is varied and complicated, basically sloping downward from the south to the north. Its landform can be approximately divided into five types: mountain, hill, valley and basin, hillock and plain. The south and southeast regions belong to ranges of Tianmu Mountain, while the southwest and west regions are respectively parts of ranges of Mt. Huangshan and Mt. Jiuhua. Qingliang Peak is also located within Xuancheng. 59.34% of the city's area is forested.

The city has a subtropical humid monsoon climate, with four distinct seasons and abundant precipitation. Of the four seasons, summer is the longest. Its annual average temperature falls round 15.6C (60.1F). Most of the rainfall occurs in summer. The plum rain season lasts from mid-June to early July.

Climate data for Xuancheng, elevation 31 m (102 ft), (1991–2020 normals, extremes 1981–present)
Month	Jan	Feb	Mar	Apr	May	Jun	Jul	Aug	Sep	Oct	Nov	Dec	Year
Record high °C (°F)	22.4 (72.3)	28.6 (83.5)	34.9 (94.8)	34.8 (94.6)	36.6 (97.9)	38.1 (100.6)	40.5 (104.9)	40.2 (104.4)	39.5 (103.1)	34.0 (93.2)	29.5 (85.1)	24.3 (75.7)	40.5 (104.9)
Mean daily maximum °C (°F)	7.8 (46.0)	10.8 (51.4)	15.7 (60.3)	22.1 (71.8)	27.0 (80.6)	29.4 (84.9)	33.2 (91.8)	32.6 (90.7)	28.2 (82.8)	23.1 (73.6)	17.1 (62.8)	10.5 (50.9)	21.5 (70.6)
Daily mean °C (°F)	3.5 (38.3)	5.9 (42.6)	10.4 (50.7)	16.5 (61.7)	21.6 (70.9)	24.9 (76.8)	28.4 (83.1)	27.9 (82.2)	23.5 (74.3)	17.8 (64.0)	11.5 (52.7)	5.5 (41.9)	16.5 (61.6)
Mean daily minimum °C (°F)	0.3 (32.5)	2.4 (36.3)	6.3 (43.3)	11.9 (53.4)	17.2 (63.0)	21.3 (70.3)	24.7 (76.5)	24.4 (75.9)	20.0 (68.0)	13.8 (56.8)	7.5 (45.5)	1.8 (35.2)	12.6 (54.7)
Record low °C (°F)	−10.2 (13.6)	−10.0 (14.0)	−3.6 (25.5)	1.4 (34.5)	7.8 (46.0)	12.7 (54.9)	18.3 (64.9)	18.0 (64.4)	11.0 (51.8)	2.2 (36.0)	−4.8 (23.4)	−12.8 (9.0)	−12.8 (9.0)
Average precipitation mm (inches)	79.2 (3.12)	77.8 (3.06)	118.0 (4.65)	118.7 (4.67)	132.7 (5.22)	255.0 (10.04)	197.0 (7.76)	147.8 (5.82)	86.4 (3.40)	67.7 (2.67)	66.9 (2.63)	51.2 (2.02)	1,398.4 (55.06)
Average precipitation days (≥ 0.1 mm)	11.7	11.3	13.8	12.4	12.7	14.0	13.2	13.0	9.7	8.6	10.0	8.8	139.2
Average snowy days	4.0	2.0	0.6	0	0	0	0	0	0	0	0.3	1.2	8.1
Average relative humidity (%)	80	78	76	74	75	81	80	80	81	79	80	78	79
Mean monthly sunshine hours	109.4	116.2	140.8	163.9	180.0	148.6	210.0	203.4	164.4	165.3	143.1	131.7	1,876.8
Percentage possible sunshine	34	37	38	42	42	35	49	50	45	47	45	42	42
Source: China Meteorological Administrationall-time May low

== Administration ==
Xuancheng City administers seven county-level divisions, including one district, two county-level cities and five counties.

- Xuanzhou District (宣州区)
- Ningguo City (宁国市)
- Guangde City (广德市)
- Langxi County (郎溪县)
- Jing County (泾县)
- Jixi County (绩溪县)
- Jingde County (旌德县)

Map
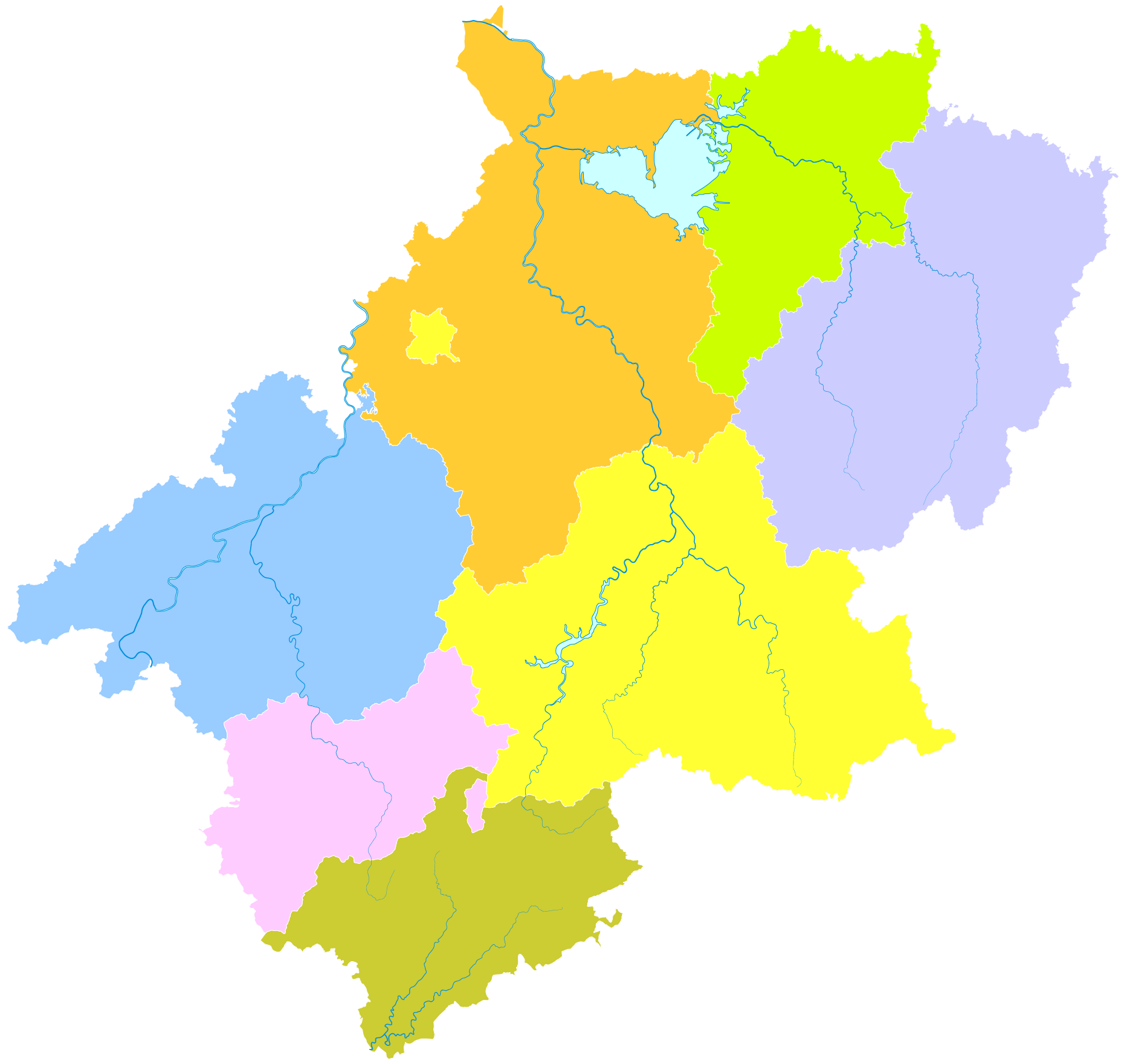

These are further divided into 115 township-level divisions, including 61 towns, 44 townships and ten subdistricts.

== Language and culture ==
In Xuancheng, Jianghuai Mandarin and Wu Chinese are spoken as well as Standard Mandarin.

Xuancheng is a city with 2,000 years of history and cultural relics. It has a profound cultural heritage and rich tourism resources. There are many scenic areas, such as the Anhui Research Center for Chinese Alligator Reproduction (ARCCAR), which is a large captive breeding base for the endangered Chinese alligator (Alligator sinensis). There are also four unique scenes – Taiji Cave, Peach Blossom Pool, Jing Ting Mountain, Zhangshan Canyon. Other attractions include cultural sites of the New Fourth Army, the Ancestral Hall of the Hu Family in Jixi (the former residence of Hu Shih), the Jiang's Village in Jingde, and so on. Since reform and opening up, the city has achieved a lot of progress and is accelerating the development of municipal services, transport, tourism and other infrastructural facilities. Xuancheng is a city with pleasant environments of living, enterprising, and sightseeing which is on the rise. The Ningguo Stadium is located in the city. The 12,000-capacity stadium is used mainly for association football matches.

== Demographics ==
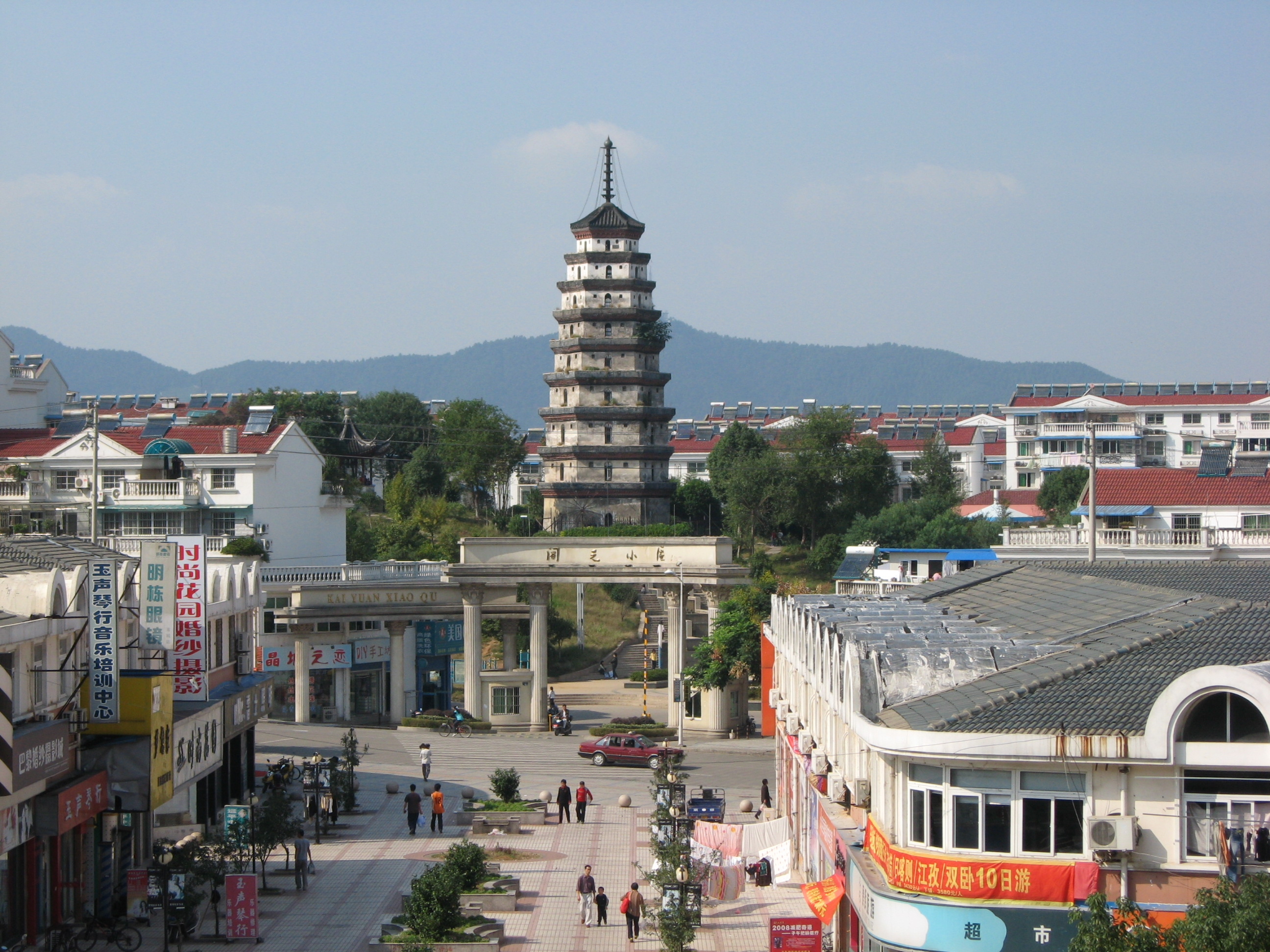
Kaiyuan Pagoda

Its population was 2,500,063 as of 2020 Chinese census whom 774,332 lived in the built-up (or metro) area made of Xuanzhou District.

The city is home to 45 ethnic minorities, whose population totals about 13,000 people. Xuancheng administers one ethnic township: Yunti She Ethnic Township. Xuancheng also administers two ethnic villages: Hucun Hui Ethnic Village (Chinese: 胡村回族村) in Shencun, Xuanzhou District, and Qianqiu She Ethnic Village (Chinese: 千秋畲族村) in Yunti She Ethnic Township, Ningguo.

== Economy ==
As of 2020, the city's gross domestic product is estimated at ¥160.75 billion, its inflation rate was 2.4%, and its urban unemployment rate was 2.7%. Total consumer retail sales in 2020 reached ¥62.66 billion, and foreign trade totaled ¥13.44 billion.

Xuancheng's per capita disposable income is ¥30,746 as of 2020, and stood at ¥42,134 for urban residents, and ¥18,928 for rural residents.

Xuancheng's major industrial products include beverages, cloth, concrete, electronics components, fertilizer, paper and cardboard.

Xuancheng is known for its production of high quality Xuan paper (simplified Chinese: 宣纸; traditional Chinese: 宣紙), Xuan writing brushes (simplified Chinese: 宣笔; traditional Chinese: 宣筆), and Xuan ink stones (simplified Chinese: 宣砚; traditional Chinese: 宣硯), all of which are used in traditional Chinese calligraphy and painting. These products make up a large proportion of the city's exports.

== Notable people ==
- Hu Shih (1891–1962): philosopher, essayist and diplomat, one of the leaders of China's New Culture Movement, former president of Peking University (in 1939 Hu Shih was nominated for a Nobel Prize in literature)
- Wang Jiaxiang (1906–1974): the first Chinese Ambassador to Soviet Union after the establishment of People's Republic of China
- Wu Zuoren (1908–1997): painter, former principal of the China Central Academy of Fine Arts
- Ren Xinmin (1915–2017): aerospace engineer and a specialist in astronautics and liquid rocket engine technology
- Hu Jintao (1942– ): former General Secretary of the Communist Party and President of China
- Mei Yaochen (1002–1060), a major poet of the Northern Song dynasty

== Education ==
- Hefei University of Technology Xuancheng Campus
- Xuancheng High School
- Xuancheng Vocational & Technical college

== Transportation ==
=== Rail ===
Xuancheng is served by the Anhui–Jiangxi Railway and Beijing–Taipei High-Speed Rail Corridor.

== See also ==
- Xuan paper
