= Jing Ting Mountain =

Mountain in Anhui, China

Jing Ting Mountain 敬亭山
- Ching-ting Mountain
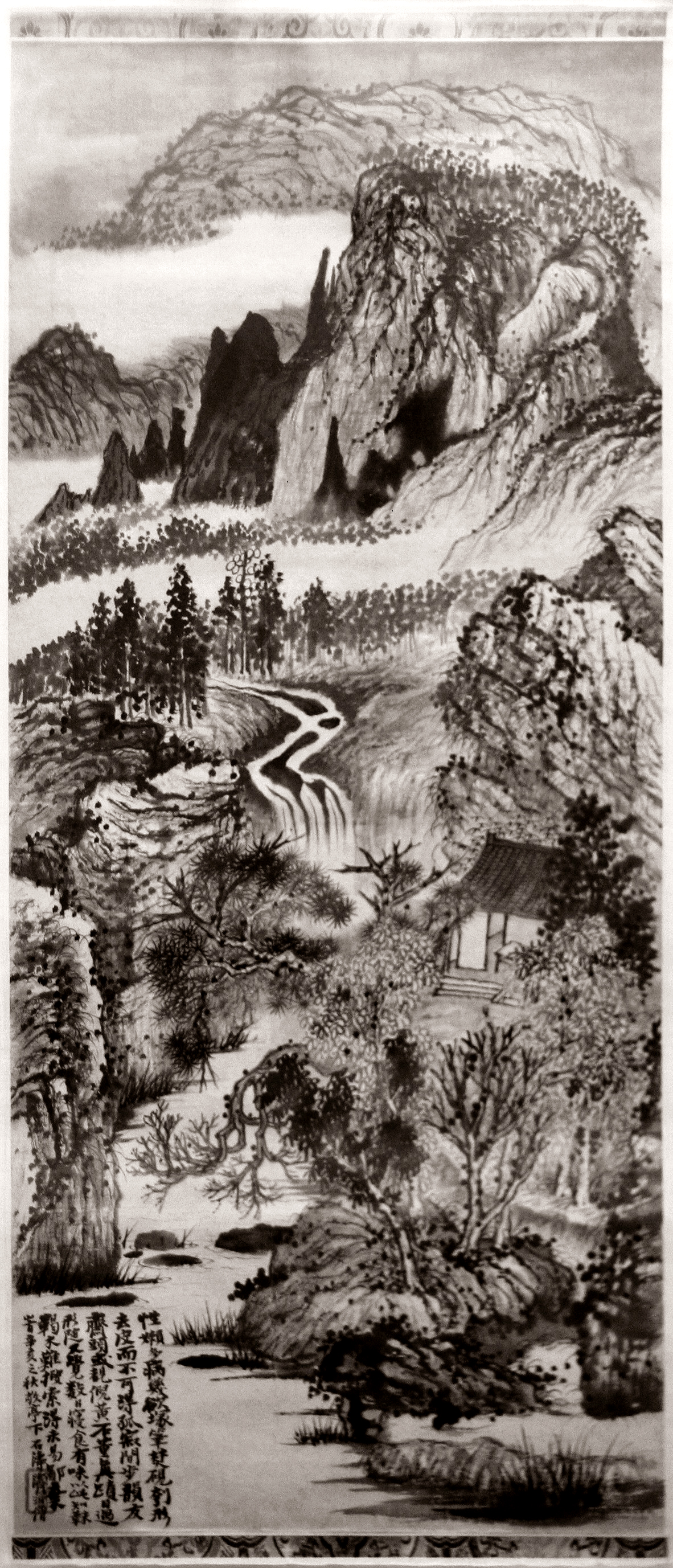
- Jing Ting Mountain in autumn, 1671, by Shitao, collection of the Musée Guimet, Paris

Geography
- Location: Xuancheng, Anhui, China

The Jing Ting Mountain (Chinese: 敬亭山), historically known by the ancient name of Zhao Ting Mountain (Chinese: 昭亭山), is a mountain in the northern suburbs of Xuancheng City, Anhui province, China.

== History ==
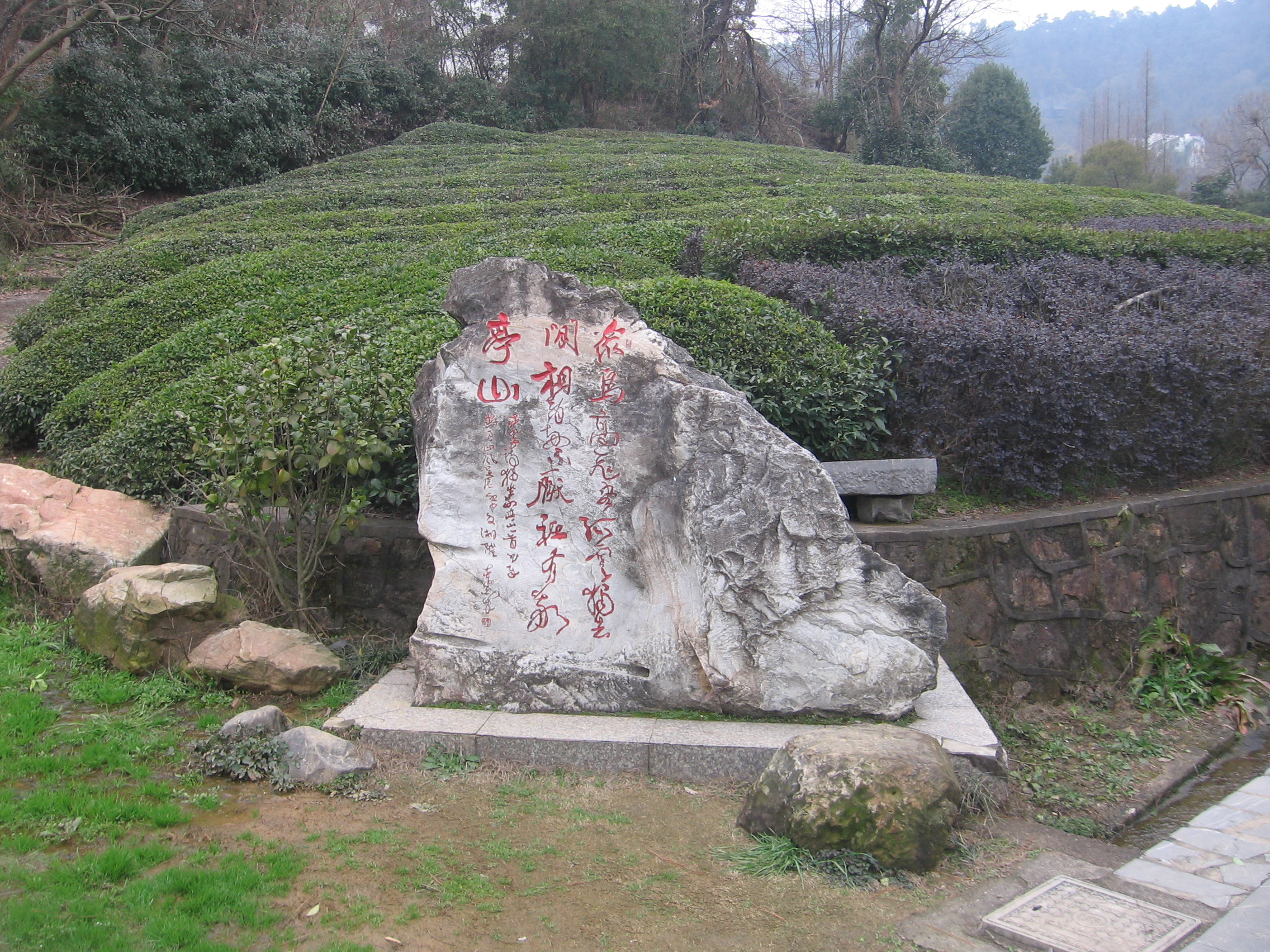
Jing Ting Mountain

Before the Jin Dynasty, the mountain was known as Zhao Ting Mountain. In 266 AD, its name was changed to Jing Ting Mountain (Jingtingshan) to avoid the name taboo of the emperor, Sima Zhao.

Jing Ting Mountain and the scenery therein has been the frequent subject of poetry and artwork. The poems written by Xie Tiao (464–499) of the Southern Qi Dynasty brought it a widespread reputation. From then on, the area was visited frequently by many poets and litterateurs. The famous Chinese ancient poet Li Bai (699-762) said that "only Jing Ting Mountain can keep attracting you without boredom." Over 1,000 poems were written about Jing Ting Mountain and, therefore, it is regarded as the "Mountain of Poetry" in China.
