= Taohuatan =

Coordinates: 30.485°N 118.152°E

- Town

Chinese transcription(s)
  - Chinese: 桃花潭镇
  - Pinyin: Táohuātán Zhèn
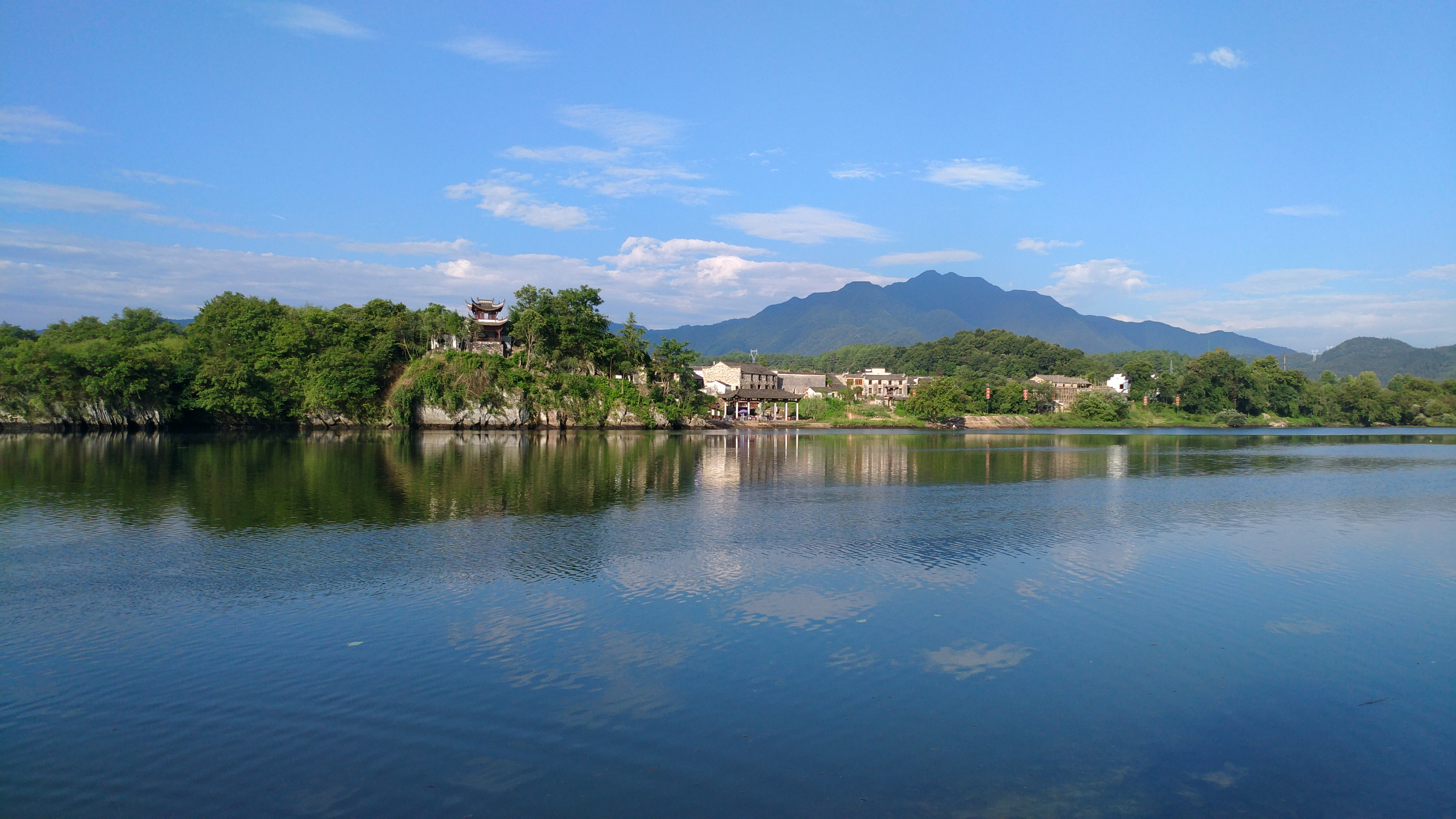
- Interactive map of Taohuatan
- Country: China
- Province: Anhui
- Prefecture: Xuancheng
- Time zone: UTC+8 (China Standard Time)

Taohuatan Zhen literally "Pool of Peach Blossoms", is a town in Xuancheng, Anhui Province, People's Republic of China.

== Literature ==
Taohuatan Town is featured in "To Wang Lun", a poem by Li Bai:

李白乘舟將欲行
忽聞岸上踏歌聲
桃花潭水深千尺
不及汪倫送我情

Translation:

A boat I have boarded, Li Bai am I, and I'm all set to go,
When suddenly from the shore a din I hear, of stomping and singing I know.
The water in the Pool of Peach Blossoms is a thousand feet deep,
Deep not as the parting sentiments, to me, Wang Lun, you show.
