= Mark Chu =

Australian multidisciplinary artist and writer

Mark Bo Chu (born May 12, 1989) is an Australian artist, writer and complexity scientist. His artwork ranges from murals to portraits and streetscapes, often depicting the everyday. Chu's 2013 debut solo show exhibited specimens of his own dandruff. As a scientific researcher, Chu has co-authored papers in journals such as Nature (journal) and Cognition (journal). He is a graduate of the Santa Fe Institute's Complex Systems Summer School where he co-founded the aesthetics research collective Comp-syn who were 2021 European Commission STARTS Prize semifinalists. Chu is a past restaurant reviewer for The Age Good Food Guide and integrates hospitality into his art practise. At thirteen years old he recorded as a piano soloist with the Melbourne Symphony Orchestra and was a 2005 keyboard finalist in the ABC Young Performers Awards. He is a fiction graduate of Columbia University's MFA and past winner of the engineering school's interdisciplinary design challenge. In 2022, for a candid portrait of his partner author Nell Pierce, Chu received a Highly Commended prize for the Lester Prize.

Mark Chu is the son of Chinese-Australia composer Chu Wanghua, and grandson of Chinese scholar and dissident Chu Anping. He lives in Melbourne with his partner Nell Pierce, and their children.
