= Chu Anping =

Chinese scholar (1909–1966?)

- 储安平
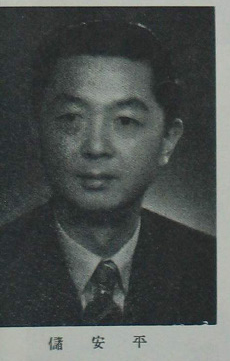
- Born: 5 November 1909
- Disappeared: September 1966 (aged 56)
- Status: Missing for 56 years and 6 months
- Education: Kwang Hua University; University of Edinburgh
- Spouse: Duanmu Luxi
- Children: Chu Wanghua

Chu Anping (simplified Chinese: 储安平; traditional Chinese: 儲安平; pinyin: Chǔ Ānpíng; Wade–Giles: Ch'u Anp'ing; 1909–1966?) was a Chinese scholar, liberal journalist and editor of Guancha (观察; Guānchá; 'The Observer') in the Civil War era of the late 1940s. He is widely considered to be one of the most famous liberals in China. He was Editor of the China Democratic League newspaper "for intellectuals", the Guangming Daily, in the PRC era. Following publication of his article entitled "The Party Dominates the World", he was attacked by Mao Zedong in the Hundred Flowers Campaign of 1957 and purged during the Anti-Rightist Movement. He disappeared in 1966. He was father to Chu Wanghua (储望华), a contemporary Chinese composer based in Australia, and grandfather to Mark Chu, a multidisciplinary artist.

== Biography ==
On June 1, 1957, at the symposium convened by the Department for United Front Work of the CCP Central Committee, Chu made a speech entitled "Comment made to Chairman Mao And Premier Zhou," which stated that Mao Zedong had seen the "world [as the] party's". Both the government and the people felt the tremendous reverberations. People's Daily and Guangming Daily both published the full text the next day with banner headlines and in a prominent position.

In January 1958, in the Anti-Rightist Movement Chu was labelled an "anti-party anti-people anti-socialism bourgeois rightist".

== Disappearance ==
In 1966 at the start of the Cultural Revolution, Chu was persecuted and forced to attend several struggle sessions in August, then attempted suicide but survived. He was then detailed for several days but soon released and ordered to return home. He soon went missing in September 1966. His whereabouts were unknown and it was believed that he either went into hiding, was either beaten to death by Red Guards, or killed himself. There are several specific theories about his ultimate whereabouts.

- Living in seclusion: A reader of Xie Tong, a professor of Chinese at Xiamen University, wrote to him that when he was young he met an old man in Tangshan, Nanjing. They spoke of famous people from Yixing, but when Chu was mentioned, the man's demeanor suddenly changed and became strange, thus leading possibility to the theory that Chu was living in seclusion in Jiangsu.

- Emigration: Zhang Yihe mentioned that when Wu Zuguang traveled outside of China in the 1980s, an elderly writer told him that he met a man whose appearance highly resembled Chu in New York. He called the man by Chu's name and the man became frightened and ran away.

- Suicide: Zhang Yihe also mentioned that before disappearing, Chu Anping left a note for a friend, Li Rucang, saying "Brother Rucang, I am leaving. Chu" Li Rucang's home in Shichahai was only two kilometers from Chu's home, and Chu liked the scenery of Shichahai and was a frequent guest in Li Rucang's home. It is possible that he became suicidal after his detention and chose Shichahai for his location of death.

- Beaten to death: A neighbor said that he heard Chu being beaten and blood splattered across the house after it was visited by red guards. It is possible that he was killed and his body was taken secretly for cremation.

In 2015, a funeral was finally held for Chu in his home county, Yixing. Photographs and a book were placed in an urn and buried in a symbolic grave by his three sons. State-run media said it was not a moment to re-evaluate the past, and his son Chu Wanghua said "Today is not a sad day. Today is a day of commemoration and remembrance."

== Publications ==
For a partial list, see Bianco (2017).

== See also ==
- List of people who disappeared
