= Zhu Yongjun =

Chinese chemist (1929–2024)

- 朱永𧸩
- Born: 15 December 1929; Jing County, Anhui, China
- Died: 8 June 2024 (aged 94); Beijing, China
- Education: Tsinghua University
- Scientific career
- Fields: Nuclear fuel reprocessing
- Workplaces: Tsinghua University

Zhu Yongjun (Chinese: 朱永𧸩; pinyin: Zhū Yǒngjùn; 15 December 1929 – 8 June 2024) was a Chinese nuclear chemical specialist, and an academician of the Chinese Academy of Engineering. He was a member of the Chinese Nuclear Society.

== Biography ==
Zhu was born in Jing County, Anhui, on 15 December 1929. In 1947, he entered Tsinghua University, where he majored in the Department of Chemistry.

After graduation in 1951, Zhu stayed for teaching. He joined the Chinese Communist Party (CCP) in April 1955. He was promoted to associate professor in 1960 and to full professor in 1970. In 1979, he became deputy director of the Institute of Nuclear Energy Technology, and held that office until 1985.

On 8 June 2024, Zhu died in Beijing, at the age of 94.

== Honours and awards ==
- 1993 State Natural Science Award (Third Class)
- 1995 Member of the Chinese Academy of Engineering (CAE)
- 1999 State Technological Invention Award (Second Class)
- 1999 Science and Technology Progress Award of the Ho Leung Ho Lee Foundation
