= Deng Yanda =

Chinese military officer (1895–1931)

- 邓演达
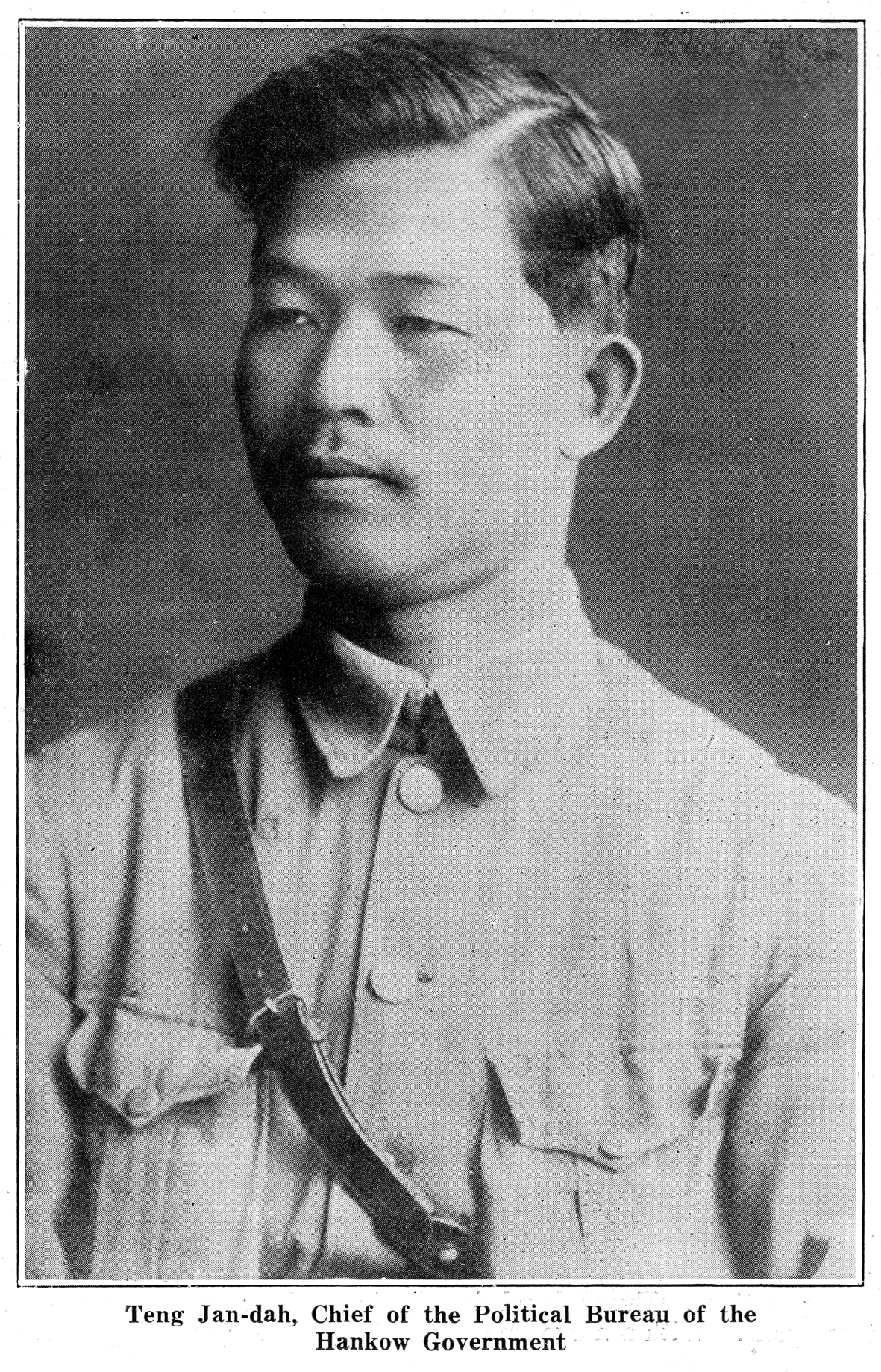
- Teng Jan-Dah ( Deng Yanda) 1927
- Born: 1 May 1895; Huizhou, Guangdong, Qing dynasty
- Died: 29 November 1931 (aged 36); Nanjing, Jiangsu, Republic of China
- Cause of death: Execution
- Education: Whampoa Military Academy
- Military career
- Allegiance: Republic of China
- Branch: National Revolutionary Army

Chinese name
- Traditional Chinese: 鄧演達
- Simplified Chinese: 邓演达
Transcriptions
Standard Mandarin
- Hanyu Pinyin: Dèng Yǎndá
- Wade–Giles: Têng^{4} Yen^{3}- ta^{2}
Hakka
- Romanization: Ten Rhanˋ- tadˋ
Yue: Cantonese
- Jyutping: Dang^{6} Jin^{2}- daat^{6}

Deng Yanda (simplified Chinese: 邓演达; traditional Chinese: 鄧演達, 1 March 1895 – 29 November 1931) was a military officer in the Chinese Nationalist Party. He broke with party leaders in 1927, denouncing them as traitors to the party's original principles and in 1930 attempted to form a new party, which he called the Provisional Action Committee of the Chinese Nationalist Party, which others have called the Third Party. It was later renamed the Chinese Peasants' and Workers' Democratic Party. In 1931 he was convicted of treason by the Nationalist government and secretly executed. Today, Deng is recognized as a revolutionary martyr by the People's Republic of China.

== Life ==
Deng Yanda was born in Huizhou County, Guangdong province. He was educated in military schools in Guangdong and Wuhan, graduating from Baoding Military Academy in 1919. Deng was recruited to the Guangdong Army in 1920 and fought under the Nationalist officer Deng Keng. When Sun Yat-sen announced his policy of alliance with the Soviet Union in 1923, Deng strongly supported it and was appointed to the preparatory committee for the Whampoa Military Academy which the Russians helped the Chinese Nationalists build.

In 1923, Sun Yat-sen attempted to appoint Deng as commander of the Kuomintang Guangdong Army, but he declined due to his inexperience and age. He was an important commander in the Northern Expedition (1926–1928) which the Nationalists launched to unify China. When Chiang Kai-shek broke with the Chinese Communist Party and Russia, Deng denounced Chiang and left China for Russia and Europe, where he lived from 1927 to 1930. On his return to China, Deng formed a new party, which he called the Provisional Action Committee of the Chinese Nationalist Party or Third Party (renamed Chinese Peasants' and Workers' Democratic Party in 1947).

By the mid-1920s, most of the Chinese political parties that were founded during the early years of the Republican era had disappeared from the political circles. There remained only two parties that became the decisive forces to the destiny of the country – the Chinese Communist Party (CCP) and the Kuomintang (KMT) after its reshuffle. In 1927, the cooperation between the CCP and the KMT broke down (White Terror). Chiang Kai-shek brought a policy of slaughter and armed-suppression to the CCP. To contend against the KMT, the Chinese Communists were forced to shift their bases to the countryside and mountain areas. Since then, the prolonged life-and-death struggle between the two political parties emerged in China. Against the background of this division of Chinese politics into two opposing parties, Deng's party, also known as the Third Party came into being.

Deng vigorously attacked Chiang Kai-shek as a dictator, angering the Nationalist government in Nanjing. He further angered them when he supported an anti-Chiang secessionist movement in Guangzhou in 1931. He was arrested in Shanghai's International Settlement on 17 August 1931, and extradited to Nanjing, where he was executed on 29 November 1931. His tomb is located near Sun Yat-sen's Mausoleum on Zhongshan Mountain near Nanjing.

== Political beliefs ==
Deng's views were socialist but after he left the Nationalists, he did not align with other parties, insisting that China's revolution should not be reined in to fit the needs of Russia or the Comintern. After Deng's death, his party supported the short-lived Fujian People's Government which opposed Chiang Kai-shek and sought an alliance with the Chinese Communists. The party eventually became one of the eight legal non-Communist parties in the People's Republic of China, where Deng is now recognised as a "Revolutionary Martyr." Although Deng's views are sometimes identified with those of Soong Ching-ling, Sun Yat-sen's widow, Soong did not join Deng's party and refused an offer to become its leader after his death.

== Relationship with Soong Ching-ling ==
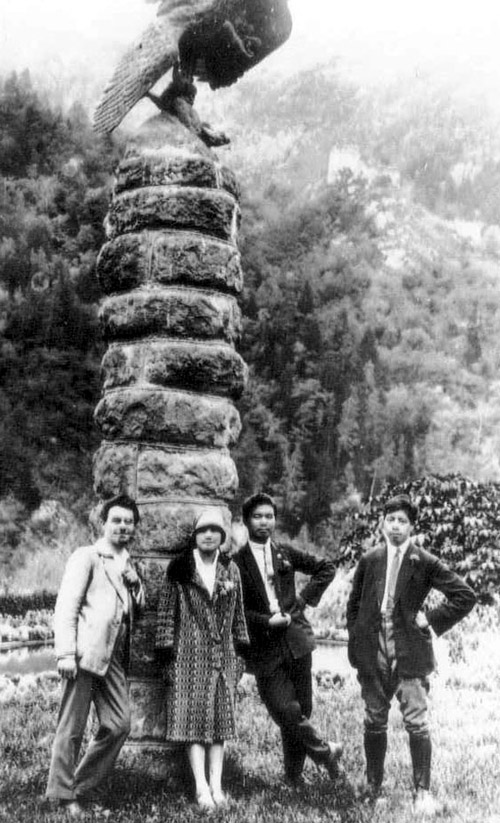
Soong Ching Ling with Deng Yanda in Moscow 1927

Deng Yanda and Soong Ching-ling met during their exiles in Moscow and Berlin in 1928. Soong admired Deng's broad vision, charisma, and charming personality, and held long discussions with him on his proposal to establish a third party as an alternative to the CCP and the KMT. In May 1928, in response to Deng's pleading, Soong left Moscow for Berlin and resided in a small apartment where she met with Deng everyday. Their conversation topics ranged from history to economics and philosophy, but they inevitably circled back to the future of China. It was also during this time that Deng intimated a friend that he was no longer in love with his wife and contemplated a divorce. When rumors about the love affair spread to the press, Soong was forced to leave Berlin and return to Moscow. Although Soong was sympathetic to Deng's plan for the third party, her status as Sun's widow forbade her from openly endorsing or joining the party.

Chiang Kai-shek arrested Deng and executed him on 29 December 1931. Upon hearing the news of Deng's arrest, Soong immediately went to Chiang and plead for Deng's release, but learned that Deng had already been executed. The shock of the news drove her into calling Chiang a "butcher" and openly calling for the downfall of the Nationalist Party. In the aftermath of Deng's death, Soong penned editorials in the New York Times and Shenbao denouncing Chiang Kai-shek. She also requested to join the Communist Party and began clandestine work for the Comintern to bring down Chiang's government.
