= Zhang Bojun =

Chinese politician

- 章伯钧
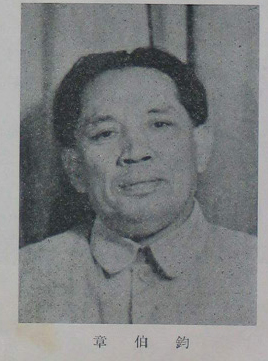

Vice Chairman of the Chinese People's Political Consultative Conference
- In office December 1954 – January 1958
- Chairman: Zhou Enlai

Minister of Communications
- In office February 1947 – January 1958
- Succeeded by: Wang Shoudao

Chairman of Chinese Peasants' and Workers' Democratic Party
- In office February 1947 – January 1958
- Succeeded by: Ji Fang

Vice Chairman of China Democratic League
- In office December 1949 – January 1958
- Chairman: Zhang Lan; Shen Junru

Personal details
- Born: November 17, 1895 Tongcheng, Anhui
- Died: May 17, 1969 (aged 73) Beijing
- Party: Chinese Communist Party; Chinese Peasants' and Workers' Democratic Party; China Democratic League
- Children: Zhang Yihe
- Education: Humboldt University of Berlin

Zhang Bojun (simplified Chinese: 章伯钧; traditional Chinese: 章伯鈞; pinyin: Zhāng Bójūn; November 17, 1895 – May 17, 1969) was a Chinese politician and intellectual, and was removed from his ministerial position in the late 1950s after being declared "China's number one rightist."

== Biography ==
Zhang graduated from the Anhui Province Tongcheng Secondary School and in 1916 completed the test to enter the Wuhan Advanced Normal School (what is now Wuhan University). In 1920 he became an English teacher at the Anhui Fourth Normal School (Anhui Xuancheng Middle School today), where he taught for a year.

In 1922 Zhang traveled to Germany—on the same boat as Zhu De—to study philosophy for the next four years. This trip was due to the support of Xu Shiying, a high-ranking Nationalist politician who held Zhang in high regard. After arriving in Germany, Zhang joined the Chinese Communist Party (CCP) after becoming friends with Zhu De (Field Marshal and Supreme Military Commander of the New China), his roommate at the time. Zhang left the CCP following the doom of the "August First" military uprising at Nanchang in 1927, and over the years, in collaboration with others, founded the so-called "third parties", known today as the Chinese Democratic Party of Peasants and Workers, and the China Democratic League. Before his revolutionary career, Zhang was the dean of No.4 Normal School (Xuancheng High School) in his home province of Anhui (where he had taught at the beginning of his career), and later an English professor in Sun Yat-sen University in Guangzhou, Guangdong Province.

He was appointed vice-chairman of the 2nd CPPCC, National Committee of the People's Republic of China (1954–1959), and minister in charge of transportation. Vocal during the Hundred Flowers Campaign, Zhang was removed by Mao Zedong from his minister's position and made a public enemy during the Anti-Rightist Campaign in 1957, being labeled "China's number one rightist".

His 10,000-volume family library was destroyed during the Cultural Revolution in the 1960s. His daughter Zhang Yihe is a writer whose history books have been censored. In 1977, eight years after his death, Chinese party publications still criticised him and presented the CCP's actions against him in a favourable light.

With his political ambitions unfulfilled and reform goals unaccomplished, Zhang lived a Renaissance man's life in his private library of ancient books and art relics after his removal from the many positions he once held. At least until the Cultural Revolution, he could retreat to this last sanctuary to reflect back on his journey from an early member of the CCP and a leader in the "August First" military uprising (1927), to a high-level power broker between the CCP and third-party political forces (late 1940s), and on to an enthusiast of the New China. He was once made an offer by the central government to live in exile abroad with state funding, but Zhang rejected the offer, and said, "Please convey to Chairman Mao, Zhang Bojun was born on this land, and he will die on this land", as quoted in his daughter's best seller of 2004 as well as unofficial biographies of friends and associates of Zhang and his family. Also quoted in his daughter's best seller was Zhang's own personal motto: "I do not judge myself by the honors I hold or by the indignities forced upon me, nor do I judge others by their successes and failures in life." Taking great personal pride in his contributions to the founding of the People's Republic, Zhang rose early on October 1 of every year to prepare for the celebration of the new republic's birthday, dressing up very meticulously for the occasion. He kept up this practice even after he was stripped of all of his titles.

Zhang died of stomach cancer and the family believed that depression as a result of his political downfall may have contributed to the deterioration of his health.

To his consolation in a poetic sense, in the TV docu-drama series The Liberation, made in China to commemorate the 60th anniversary of the founding of the People's Republic, Zhang was portrayed fairly accurately in his activities as a power-broker in the late 1940s, though overall the role in the TV docu-drama was minor.

Party political offices
New title	President of the Guangming Daily; 1949–1957	Succeeded by Yang Mingxuan
New title	Chairman of the Chinese Peasants' and Workers' Democratic Party; 1947–1958	Succeeded by Ji Fang
Government offices
New title	Minister of Communications; 1954–1958	Succeeded by Wang Shoudao
