= Jin Jingzhe =

Chinese physician and politician (b. 1963)

Personal details
- Born: May 1963 (age 63) Kuandian, Dandong, Liaoning
- Party: Chinese Peasants' and Workers' Democratic Party

Chinese name
- Chinese: 金京哲
Transcriptions
Standard Mandarin
- Hanyu Pinyin: Jīn Jīngzhé

Chinese Korean name
- Chosŏn'gŭl: 김경철
Transcriptions
- Revised Romanization: Gim Gyeongcheol
- McCune–Reischauer: Kim Kyŏngch'ŏl

Jin Jingzhe or Kim Kyong-chol (born May 1963) is a Chinese physician of Korean ethnicity who specializes in cancer treatment. He was a delegate to the 13th National People's Congress. Jin is currently [when?] the deputy general director of Dandong First Hospital and was called the city's "leader of oncology".

== Career ==
Jin's medical approaches to treating cancer are various, from radiation therapy and chemotherapy to traditional Chinese medicine. He became a party member of Chinese Peasants' and Workers' Democratic Party in June 2003 while working as a noticeable doctor of the Liaoning Province. This United Front-affiliated political party is known to have extensive membership in the field of public health and medicine. Jin proposed a dedicated cancer medical service platform as a delegate of the National People's Congress from 2018 to 2023, expressing his expertise in the field of curing cancer. Later on, he became the project manager for the establishment of Liaoning Province's medical laboratory for oncology and its application to bioengineering in August 2022.
