= Xuancheng High School =

Information
- Type: Public School
- Established: 1906
- Website: xczx.net.cn

The Xuancheng High School of Anhui Province (Chinese: 安徽省宣城中学), commonly referred to as Xuancheng High School or Xuanzhong (Chinese: 宣中), is a public high school located in Xuancheng, Anhui Province, China. It was established in 1906 as Secondary School of Ningguo Prefecture (Chinese: 宁国府中学堂).

== History ==
=== Timeline ===
- 1906 Secondary School of Ningguo Prefecture
- 1913 Anhui Fourth Provincial Normal School
- 1927 Anhui Fourth Provincial High School
- 1945 Anhui Provincial Xuancheng High School
- 1949 Xuancheng High School of Southern Anhui (Wannan)
- 1952 Xuancheng High School of Anhui Province

== Alumni ==
- Ding Xueliang: Professor at the Hong Kong University of Science and Technology.
- Zhang Bojun: Chinese politician and intellectual.
- Ren Xinmin: Chinese Engineer, Chief Designer of Chinese storable propellant rocket engines.
