= Peng Zemin =

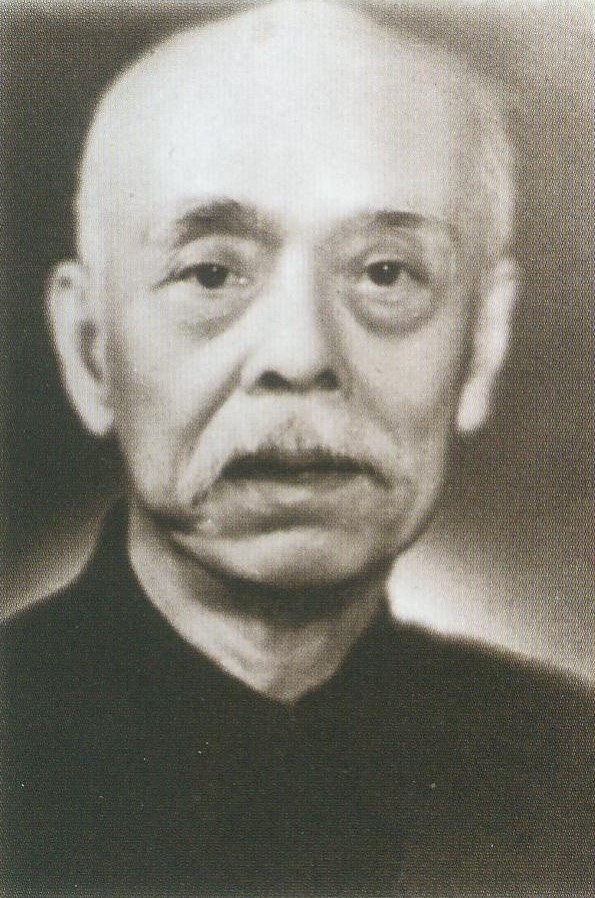
Portrait of Peng Zemin (taken in the early 1950s).

Peng Zemin (Chinese: 彭泽民) (1877 -- 18 October 1956), whose courtesy name was Jinquan, and pseudonym was Yongxi, was a native of Sihui, Guangdong. He later lived in Malaysia, and was a leader of Overseas Chinese in Modern China.

== Biography ==
In 1906, he initiated the establishment of the Kuala Lumpur branch of the Chinese Revolutionary Alliance (also known as Tongmenghui) and was elected as the secretary. In 1924, he was expelled by the British authorities for supporting the Hong Kong workers' strike. In 1926, he returned to China and was elected as the Minister of Overseas Affairs of the Central Executive Committee of the Chinese Nationalist Party, also called Kuomintang(KMT), at the organization's Second National Congress. In 1927, he opposed Chiang Kai-shek and Wang Jingwei and participated in the Nanchang Uprising. In 1930, he participated in the organization of the Provisional Action Committee of the Kuomintang (the predecessor of the Chinese Peasants' and Workers' Democratic Party). During the Second Sino-Japanese War, he carried out the democratic movement for national salvation overseas. After the end of the Second Sino-Japanese War, he reorganized the Chinese Peasants and Workers Democratic Party in Shanghai and engaged in the democratic movement.

After 1949, he held various positions, including Member of the Central People's Government Committee, Member of the Standing Committee of the National People's Congress, Member of the National Standing Committee of the Chinese People's Political Consultative Conference, Vice Chairman of the Central Committee of the Chinese Peasants' and Workers' Democratic Party, and Vice Chairman of the All-China Federation of Returned Overseas Chinese. In 1954, he was elected as a deputy to the First National People's Congress. In September, he attended the Congress where he participated in discussions on the draft constitution and delivered a speech.

In 1956, he died in Beijing and was buried in the Babaoshan Revolutionary Cemetery.
