= Chinese Peasants' and Workers' Democratic Party =

Minor political party in China

Chinese Peasants' and Workers' Democratic Party 中国农工民主党
- Abbreviation: CPWDP
- Chairperson: He Wei
- Founded: November 1927; 99 years ago, formally on 9 August 1930; 96 years ago in Shanghai French Concession
- Split from: Kuomintang (left-wing faction); Fujian People's Government (Productive People's Party)
- Headquarters: 55 Andingmenwai Street, Dongcheng District, Beijing
- Newspaper: Qianjin Luntan ("Forum For Advancement"); Medicine & Health Care Daily
- Membership (2022): 192,000
- Ideology: Socialism with Chinese characteristics
- National People's Congress (14th): 60 / 2,977
- NPC Standing Committee (14th): 5 / 175
- CPPCC National Committee (14th): 45 / 544 (Seats for political parties)

Website
- www.ngd.org.cn

Chinese Peasants' and Workers' Democratic Party
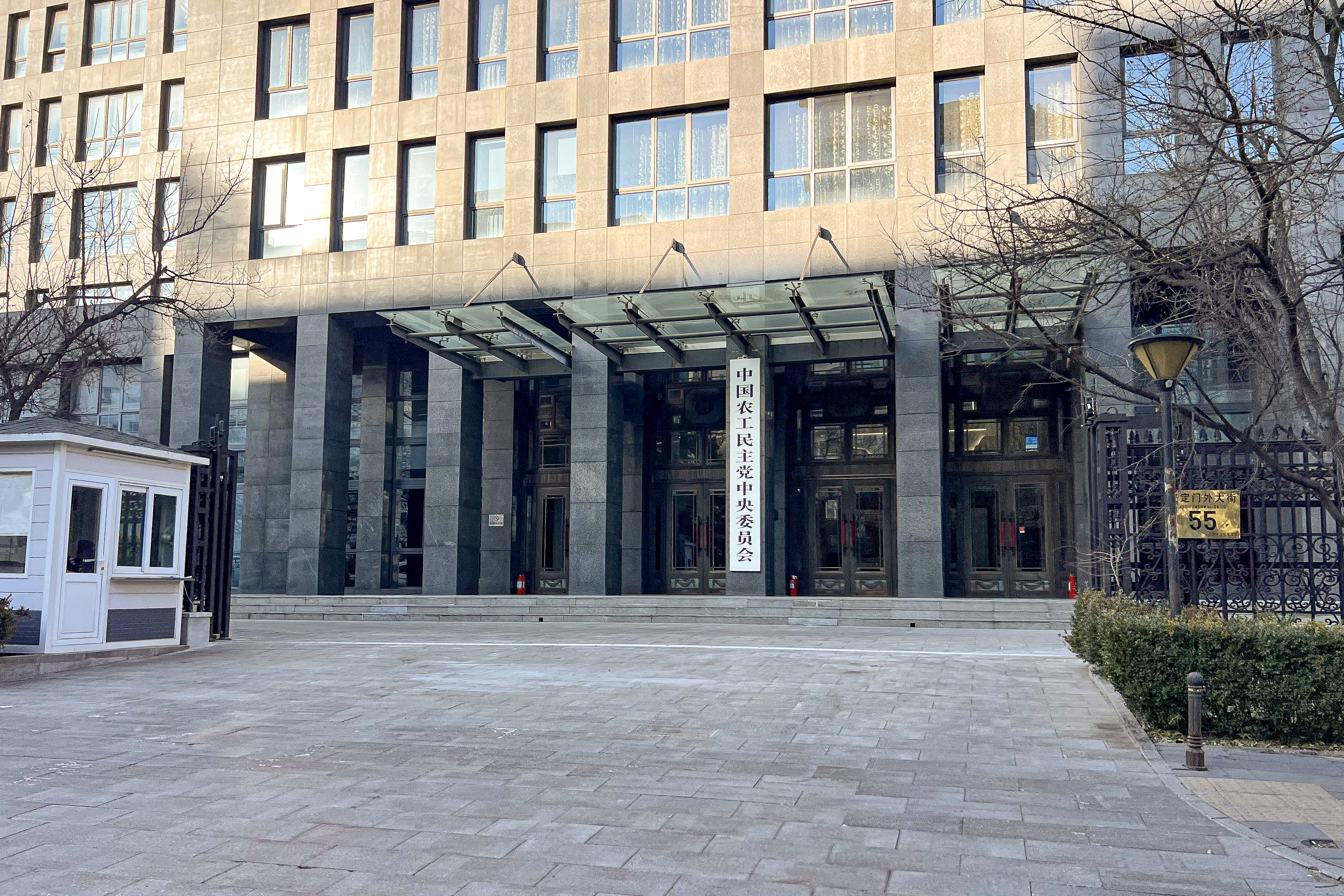

Chinese name
- Simplified Chinese: 中国农工民主党
- Traditional Chinese: 中國農工民主黨
Transcriptions
Standard Mandarin
- Hanyu Pinyin: Zhōngguó Nónggōng Mínzhǔdǎng
- Wade–Giles: Chung-kuo Nung-kung Min-chu-tang

Abbreviation
- Simplified Chinese: 农工党
- Traditional Chinese: 農工黨
Transcriptions
Standard Mandarin
- Hanyu Pinyin: Nónggōngdǎng

Tibetan name
- Tibetan: ཀྲུང་གོ་ཞིང་བཟོ་དམངས་གཙོ་ཏང
Transcriptions
- Wylie: krung go zhing bzo dmangs gtso tang

Zhuang name
- Zhuang: Cunghgoz Nungzgungh Minzcuj Danj

Mongolian name
- Mongolian Cyrillic: Дундад улсын тариачны-ажилчин ардчилсан нам
- Mongolian script: ᠳᠤᠮᠳᠠᠳᠤ ᠤᠯᠤᠰ ᠤᠨ ᠲᠠᠷᠢᠶᠠᠴᠢᠨ ᠤ ᠠᠵᠢᠯᠴᠢᠨ ᠠᠷᠠᠳᠴᠢᠯᠠᠭᠰᠠᠨ ᠨᠠᠮ

Uyghur name
- Uyghur: جۇڭگو دېھقان-ئىشچىلار دېموكراتىك پارتىيىسى
Transcriptions
- Latin Yëziqi: Junggo déhqan-ishchilar démokratik partiyisi
- Yengi Yeziⱪ: Junggo déhqan-ishchilar démokratik partiyisi

Manchu name
- Manchu script: ᠨᠣᠩᡬᠣᠩᡩᠠᠩ
- Romanization: Nongg'ongdang

The Chinese Peasants' and Workers' Democratic Party (CPWDP), also known as the Peasants' and Workers' Party/PWP, is one of the eight minor non-oppositional political parties in the People's Republic of China, officially termed "democratic parties," led by the Chinese Communist Party.

The party was officially founded in the Shanghai French Concession on 9 August 1930 by left-wing members of the Kuomintang. It is mainly made up of members who mostly work in the fields of public health, medicine, and associated fields in science and technology. It is the fifth-ranking minor party in China. It currently has 60 seats in the National People's Congress, 5 seats in the NPC Standing Committee and 45 seats in the Chinese People's Political Consultative Conference. The current chairman of CPWDP is He Wei.

== History ==
The origins of the Chinese Peasants’ and Workers’ Democratic Party can be traced to the political realignments following the 1927 Civil War. In May 1927, Deng Yanda, a leading figure of the left wing of the Kuomintang (KMT), concluded that the Wuhan-based KMT central leadership was preparing to abandon Sun Yat-sen’s revolutionary principles of "alliance with the Soviet Union, cooperation with the Chinese Communist Party, and support for workers and peasants." He therefore began to plan the establishment of a new political organization independent of both the KMT and the Chinese Communist Party.

In November 1927, Soong Ching-ling, Deng Yanda, and other left-wing KMT members issued the Manifesto to the Revolutionary People of China and the World in the name of the Provisional Action Committee of the Chinese Kuomintang. In early 1928, Tan Pingshan, Zhang Bojun, and others established the Chinese Revolutionary Party in Shanghai, with Deng Yanda serving as its chief leader.

On 9 August 1930, Deng Yanda convened the First National Cadres Conference in Shanghai, formally founding the Provisional Action Committee of the Chinese Kuomintang. The organization adopted the political program Political Propositions of the Provisional Action Committee of the Chinese Kuomintang and elected a Central Cadres Committee, with Deng Yanda as General Secretary. Seeking to establish a bourgeois republic in China outside both the KMT and the CCP, the party became widely known as the “Third Party.” The organization carried out political and organizational activities in parts of East, North, and South China, while preparing for the armed seizure of political power.

On 29 November 1931, Deng Yanda was secretly executed by the Nationalist government in Nanjing. Following his death, the organization was forced underground. In November 1933, the 19th Route Army launched a coup in Fujian, historically known as the Fujian Incident. Members of the Third Party participated in the movement, which convened the Provisional National People’s Congress in Fuzhou. Huang Qixiang served as chairman of the congress and became one of the eleven commissioners of the People’s Revolutionary Government of the Chinese Republic, concurrently holding the post of Chief of Staff of the Military Commission. The Third Party subsequently announced its dissolution, with its members collectively joining the Productive People’s Party. The movement soon failed.

Following the CCP’s issuance of the August 1 Declaration in 1935, which called for an end to civil war and united resistance against Japanese aggression, the Provisional Action Committee was re-established. From 10 to 16 November 1935, it held its Second National Cadres Conference in Hong Kong. The organization was renamed the Chinese National Liberation Action Committee, adopted an anti-Japanese united front strategy of cooperation with the CCP, and passed the Provisional Action Program. Huang Qixiang was again elected Secretary of the Central Committee, while Peng Zexiang served as Secretary of the Organizational Committee.

After the conference, the committee established regional bureaus in North China, East China, and South China, with bases in Beiping, Shanghai, and Guangzhou, and actively engaged in national salvation and resistance activities. Li Shihao served as Secretary of the East China Bureau, while figures such as Ouyang Ping, He Zhongmin, Yang Qingyuan, and Shi Jianzhong were members of its leadership. The North China Bureau and Beiping municipal organization included leaders such as He Shikun, Wang Yifan, Zhang Yunchuan, Zhou Huisheng, Wang Shouxian, Wu Jiandong, and Qin Hanchuan. The committee also established links with prominent intellectuals, including Yang Xiufeng, Zhang Youyu, Zhang Dongsun, and Guo Dazhong.

In June 1937, Peng Zexiang visited Yan’an at the invitation of Mao Zedong, with assistance from CCP underground organizations. During his stay, Mao Zedong held extensive discussions with Peng on the national situation, the anti-Japanese attitudes of figures such as Li Jishen and Bai Chongxi, and strategies for establishing a united national resistance front.

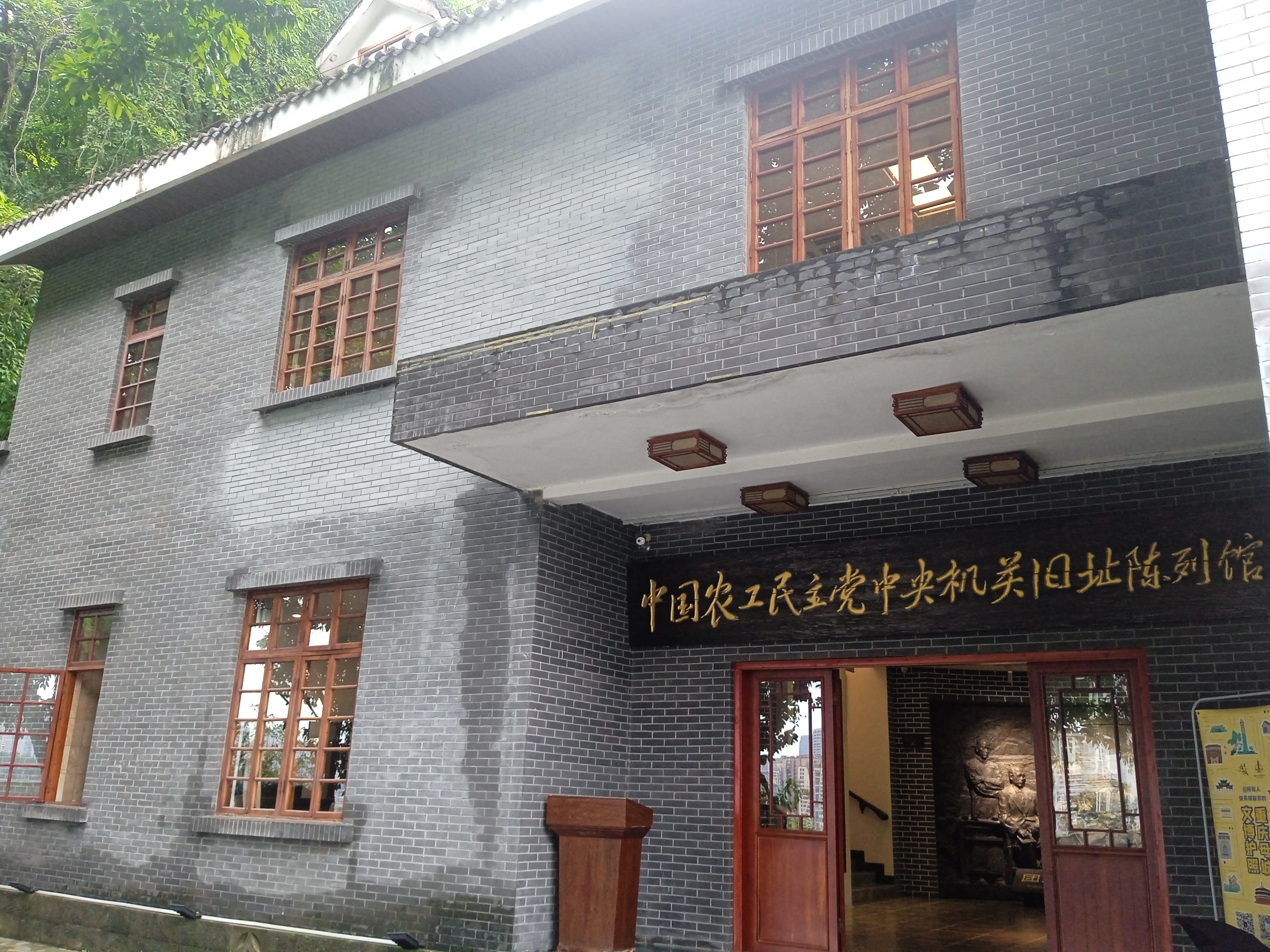
the former site of the Central Headquarters of the Chinese Peasants' and Workers' Democratic Party in Chongqing

On 1 March 1938, the Chinese National Liberation Action Committee convened its Third National Cadres Conference in Hankou. The meeting adopted the Political Propositions during the War of Resistance against Japan, formally recognizing the CCP’s anti-Japanese line and strategy as the guiding principle for the party’s actions and strengthening political cooperation with the CCP. Zhang Bojun was elected General Liaison Officer, and the party decided to divide its local organizations into “rear-area organizations” and “occupied-area organizations,” each operating according to local conditions.

In March 1941, the organization participated in the founding of the China Democratic League, joining other patriotic democratic forces in advocating constitutional government and national unity during the war. After the victory of the War of Resistance against Japan, it actively took part in movements for peace and democracy, opposing civil war and dictatorship, and refused to participate in the National Assembly convened solely by the KMT.

On 3 February 1947, the Fourth National Cadres Conference was held in Shanghai, at which the party was renamed the Chinese Peasants' and Workers' Democratic Party, and Zhang Bojun was elected Chairman of the Central Executive Committee. The party subsequently supported the Chinese Civil War efforts led by the CCP and responded to the CCP’s “May 1 Call” in 1948 for convening a new Political Consultative Conference and establishing a democratic coalition government.

In January 1949, leaders of the party jointly issued the statement Our Opinions on the Current Situation with other democratic parties and non-party figures, declaring their willingness to carry out revolution under CCP leadership. In September 1949, party representatives including Peng Zemin, Guo Guanjie, and Li Shihao attended the First Plenary Session of the Chinese People’s Political Consultative Conference and participated in drafting the Common Program. Zhang Bojun later entered the central government as Minister of Communications.

The party held its Fifth and Sixth National Cadres Conferences in 1949 and 1951 respectively. During the Anti-Rightist Campaign, a large number of party members were labeled as rightists; the most prominent among them included Han Zhao’e, Zhang Shenfu, Zhang Bojun, Huang Qixiang, Huang Xianfan, Li Shihao, Li Boqiu, Zhang Yunchuan, Deng Haoming, and Li Shuzhong.

In November 1958, the National Cadres Conference system was replaced by the National Congress system, and the Seventh National Congress was convened. Subsequent congresses were held in 1979, 1983, 1988, 1992, 1997, 2002, 2007, 2012, 2017, and 2022. The 16th National Congress, held in November 2017, elected a new Central Committee of 214 members, with Chen Zhu elected as Chairman. The 17th National Congress concluded in December 2022, successfully completing the election of the 17th Central Committee.

== Organization ==
According to its constitution, the CPWDP is officially committed to socialism with Chinese characteristics and upholding the leadership of the CCP. It is the fifth-ranking minor democratic party in China.

The highest body of the CPWDP officially is the National Congress, which is held every five years. The 17th National Congress, held in December 2022, was the most recently held Party Congress. The National Congress elects the Central Committee of the CPWDP. In June 2022, the party had organizations in 30 province-level administrative divisions throughout China. The CPWDP publishes the newspapers Qianjin Luntan ("Forum For Advancement") and Medicine & Health Care Daily.

=== Composition ===
The CPWDP is made up of members who mostly work in the fields of public health, medicine, and associated fields in science and technology. As of June 2022, it has a membership of 192,000.

=== Chairpersons ===
The leader of the Party is officially called the Chairperson of the Central Committee of the Chinese Peasants' and Workers' Democratic Party. Between 9 August 1930 and 10 November 1935, the office was known as the Secretary-General of the Central Executive Committee of the Provisional Action Committee of the Kuomintang, which changed to the General Secretary of the Central Committee of the Chinese National Liberation Action Committee on 10 November 1935, which changed to the General Contact Person of the Central Provisional Executive Committee of the Chinese National Liberation Action Committee in March 1938, which again changed and assumed its current name on 3 February 1947.

No.	Chairperson	Took office	Left office	Ref.
1	Deng Yanda 邓演达	9 August 1930	17 August 1931	
2	Huang Qixiang 黃琪翔	17 August 1931	March 1938	
3	Zhang Bojun 章伯钧	March 1938	10 December 1958	
4	Ji Fang 季方	10 December 1958	January 1987	
5	Zhou Gucheng 周谷城	January 1987	13 November 1988	
6	Lu Jiaxi 卢嘉锡	13 November 1988	November 1997	
7	Jiang Zhenghua 蒋正华	November 1997	11 December 2007	
8	Sang Guowei 桑国卫	15 December 2007	December 2012	
9	Chen Zhu 陈竺	December 2012	9 December 2022	
10	He Wei 何维	9 December 2022	Incumbent	

== Electoral history ==
=== National People's Congress elections ===
Election year	Number of seats
2017–18	54 / 2,970
2022–23	60 / 2,977

== Notable members ==
- Jin Jingzhe (born 1963), Chinese physician and delegate to the National People's Congress
