= Political-Legal Research =

Chinese legal journal

Political-Legal Research 政法研究 was the People's Republic of China's only long lasting academic journal on law. It was originally published in May 1954 and ran until May 1966. Until the Hundred Flowers Campaign, it consisted of propaganda articles, study of the law of the Soviet Union, and practical instruction on trivial matters such as document preparation. During the Hundred Flowers Campaign, articles expanded their discourse with topics such as proposing new rules of evidence and suggesting that the CCP was bound by the law.
