= Anti-Rightist Campaign =

1957–59 Chinese political campaign under Mao Zedong

- Location: People's Republic of China
- Date: 1957–1959
- Target: Political opponents, alleged right-wing figures
- Attack type: Political repression
- Victims: 550,000 (official figures); 1–2 million (estimates)
- Perpetrators: Mao Zedong; Deng Xiaoping; Peng Zhen

The Anti-Rightist Campaign (simplified Chinese: 反右运动; traditional Chinese: 反右運動; pinyin: Fǎnyòu Yùndòng) in the People's Republic of China (PRC), which lasted from 1957 to roughly 1959, was a political campaign to purge alleged "Rightists" within the Chinese Communist Party (CCP) and the country as a whole. The campaign was launched by Chairman Mao Zedong following the Hundred Flowers Campaign. Deng Xiaoping and Peng Zhen also played important roles. The Anti-Rightist Campaign consolidated the PRC's status as a one-party state.

The definition of rightists was not always consistent, often including critics to the left of the government, but officially referred to those intellectuals who appeared to favor capitalism, or were against one-party rule as well as forcible, state-run collectivization. According to China's official statistics published during the "Boluan Fanzheng" period, the campaign resulted in the political persecution of at least 550,000 people. Some researchers believe that the actual number of those persecuted is between 1 and 2 million or even higher. Deng Xiaoping admitted that there were mistakes during the Anti-Rightist Campaign, and most victims received rehabilitation after 1959.

== History ==
=== Background ===
The Anti-Rightist Campaign was a reaction against the Hundred Flowers Campaign which had promoted pluralism of expression and criticism of the government, even though initiation of both campaigns was controlled by Mao Zedong and were integrally connected. Going perhaps as far back as the Long March there had been resentment against "rightists" inside the CCP, for example, Zhang Bojun.

While the Hundred Flowers Movement was going on, in 1956, Khrushchev published the On the Cult of Personality and Its Consequences, which along with the ensuing riots in Poland and Hungary, had a large impact on China, where similar social unrest began to take place.

=== Definition of "Rightists" ===
Defining "rightists" was not always consistent. Rightists included critics of the governmental left, but officially referred to intellectuals who appeared to favor capitalism, or were against one-party rule and forced, state-run collectivization. Rightists could be categorized as "active rightists" (主动右派) and "passive rightists" (被动右派). The "active rightists" could further be divided into three groups: "right-wing intellectuals", "revisionists" and "rights defenders."

"Right-wing intellectuals" consisted of influential democratic personalities before 1949, such as Zhang Bojun and Luo Longji, who championed constitutional change and changing the method of government. "Revisionists" included Party intellectuals such as Li Shenzhi and Liu Binyan. It also included students such as Lin Xiling, who denounced cult of personality and were in favor of changes consistent with democracy. "Rights defenders" would cite the Constitution of China to condemn government violations of political rights, of individual freedoms, and of economic and social rights. "Rights defenders" also criticized the absence of freedom in the fields of science, culture, and art at a time when academic fields such as law, political science, and sociology had been suppressed.

Contradictory to common belief, the Anti-Rightist Campaign did not only impact intellectuals: it extended to members of every social class, including teachers, employees and cadre. Individuals were also labelled rightists due to Political faction conflicts, grudges, and/or the mismanagement of interpersonal relations. Officials and intellectuals took advantage of the campaign to attack peers and competitors. The official number of those labeled rightists was 552,877, but did not include people labeled as "center-rightists," "anti-socialist elements" or "counterrevolutionaries." It also did not include members of victims' families or those who suffered other sanctions without ever being labeled. Total estimates range from the consensus of 1 million, to 3 million, or even 5 million, if the people suppressed during the Socialist Education Movement is taken into account.

=== First wave ===
During the Hundred Flowers Movement, some ideas that were not tolerated by the Party were gradually raised. One example of public rightist remarks came from Huang Xinping, a high school teacher in Tianjin who said, "why can we not have a system that allows each party to take turns being in power?" Chu Anping called for greater representation of non-CCP members in the national government on June 2, 1957. By January 1958, he had been attacked as a rightist and purged from his positions.

The first wave of attacks began immediately as the Hundred Flowers Campaign drew to a close in June 1957. At the time, Mao began to view criticism during the Hundred Flowers as a threat to the rule of the party. In mid-May, Mao began writing Things Are Beginning to Change, an article that was not completed until June 11. In the article he said, "why is such a torrent of reactionary, vicious statements being allowed to appear in the press? to let the people have some idea of these poisonous weeds and noxious fumes so as to have them uprooted or dispelled." On June 8, 1957, Mao drafted an inner-party document, Muster Our Forces to Repulse the Rightists' Wild Attacks, saying that "some bad capitalists, bad intellectuals, and reactionary elements in society are mounting wild attacks against the working class and the Communist Party in an attempt to overthrow the state power led by the working class."

On the same day, People's Daily published an editorial Why is This So?, expressing the same view as the inner-party document. These marked the beginning of the Anti-Rightist Campaign. By the end of the year, 300,000 people had been labeled as rightists, including the writer Ding Ling. Future premier Zhu Rongji, then working in the State Planning Commission, was purged in 1958. Most of the accused were intellectuals. The penalties included informal criticism, hard labor, and in some cases, execution. For example, Jiabiangou, a notable labor camp in Gansu, held approximately 3,000 political prisoners from 1957 to 1961, of whom about 2,500 died, mostly of starvation.

One main target was the independent legal system. Legal professionals were transferred to other jobs; judicial power was exercised instead by political cadres and the police. Until the Hundred Flowers Campaign, China's top legal journal consisted of propaganda articles, study of the law of the Soviet Union, and practical instruction on trivial matters such as document preparation. During the Hundred Flowers Campaign, articles expanded their discourse with topics such as proposing new rules of evidence and suggesting that the CCP was bound by the law. The Chinese Political Science and Law Association hosted speeches in Beijing May 1957 which criticized nearly every aspect of the PRC's legal system. Criticism came from outside the party and high ranking party members. In January 1958, Wu Defeng, vice-president of the Chinese Political Science and Law Association, responded to the criticism with emphasis on the centrality of the party and its connection to the mass line. During the Anti-Rightist Campaign, China's legal journals either terminated publication or reverted to exclusively publishing propaganda pieces. The legal profession reflected a larger shift in public expectation which placed more emphasis on class struggle and being red first and expert second. Class struggle, foundational in Mao's China, began as opposition to the landlords and capitalists, but under the Anti-Rightist movement Mao re-targeted this struggle against anyone with intellectual opposition to the party. This shift laid the foundation for further targeting of intellectuals in the Cultural Revolution.

=== Second wave ===
The second part of the campaign followed the Lushan Conference of July 2 – August 16, 1959, a meeting of top party leaders. The meeting condemned China's defense minister, General Peng Dehuai, a critic of the Great Leap Forward.

=== Punishments ===
In 1957, rightists received widespread condemnation. A portion of those persecuted admitted to their "crimes" and agreed to go through labor reform to purge their "reactionary" minds and grow through difficulties. Punishments included imprisonment, reform internment through labor camps (laogai), internment in farms, re-education through labor, banishment to the countryside, layoffs, short-term imprisonment in work units, working under surveillance, and salary cuts. The Xingkaihu labor camp was established due to the lack of prison facilities from the large-scale persecution during the Anti-Rightist campaign and was directly managed by the Beijing Public Security Bureau. The CCP mixed political prisoners with criminals in the labor camp, which allowed the police to utilize criminal prisoners to surveil and discipline the political prisoners. In Beidahuang, labor camp authorities made maneuvers that benefited themselves and were hyperactive, which contributed to severe food scarcity and heavy volumes of work for the exiled. This gave rise to a large death toll for the exiles. The exiles also received physical abuse and some committed suicide. On the army farms and in the Xingkaihu labor camp, a number of intellectuals attacked others to promote themselves and to display their loyalty to the authorities. Many rightists and political exiles still identified with the Party's ideology and acquiesced to the idea of ideological reform through labor. They worked hard to show penitence and reach self-atonement. Some became self-afflicted.

A number of people were executed. Administering several provinces in the southwest, Deng proved so zealous in killing alleged counter-revolutionaries that even the chairman felt obliged to write to him. Mao urged Deng Xiaoping to slow down the campaign's body count, saying: "If we kill too many, we will forfeit public sympathy and a shortage of labor power will arise."

== Legacy ==
The 1981 Resolution on Certain Questions in the History of Our Party since the Founding of the People's Republic of China stated that the Anti-Rightist Campaign was "correct" and "necessary" but "too broad" in its scope, resulting in many intellectuals and others being "unjustifiably" attacked.

In a 2018 study by Zhaojin Zeng and Joshua Eisenman, analysing 144 counties within Anhui, Henan, and Jiangsu, it was found that the economic harm caused by the Anti-Rightist campaign continued for decades, even into 2000, compounded by existing issues with human capital at the time. The higher the percentage of the population were declared Rightists, the worse the economic outcomes would be in each county. Literacy rates were affected well into 1982, and academic performance at the high school level, as well as in compulsory education, continued to be affected into 2000. Counties that were previously Laoqu were found to have purged fewer Rightists than others because the party secretaries were local to the area. Negative correlations between the famine of the Great Leap Forward and China's economic performance in 1982 were also found, and distinguished from the Anti-Rightist Campaign, confirming a 2017 study by Elizabeth Gooch; additionally, it was found that the effects were more significant compared to the Cultural Revolution.

The campaign halted early PRC efforts to professionalize the country's judiciary.

According to academic Dayton Lekner, the term "rightist" is ambiguous and subject to contestation among those who had been targeted in the movement. Lekner observes that some reject the idea of a left/right binary, others "see the Rightist label as a badge of honor", and some retrospectively "adopt the Rightist moniker as a sign of their current political views."

== Rehabilitation ==
After Mao's death in 1976, many of the convictions were revoked during the Boluan Fanzheng period. At that time, under leader Deng Xiaoping, the government announced that it needed capitalists' experience to get the country moving economically, and subsequently the guilty verdicts of thousands of counterrevolutionary cases were overturned — affecting many of those accused of rightism and who had been persecuted for that crime the previous twenty two years. This came despite the fact that Deng Xiaoping and Peng Zhen were among the most enthusiastic prosecutors of the movement during the "First Wave" of 1957.

== Censorship in China ==
In 2009, leading up the 60th anniversary of the PRC's founding, a number of media outlets in China listed the most significant events of 1957 but downplayed or omitted reference to the Anti-Rightist Movement. Websites were reportedly notified by authorities that the topic of the movement was extremely sensitive.

== Famous rightists ==
- Zhang Bojun, China's "number one rightist"
- Luo Longji, China's "number two rightist"
- Huang Qixiang
- Chen Mingshu
- Chen Mengjia
- Zhu Rongji, later Premier of China
- Wu Zuguang, playwright
- Qian Weichang
- Gu Zhun
- Long Yun, former warlord of Yunnan
- Chu Anping

== See also ==
- Great Leap Forward
- Anti-Right Deviation Struggle
- Great Purge
- Cultural Revolution
- De-Stalinization
- List of CCP Campaigns
- Sufan movement
- Yan'an Rectification Movement
