= Zhangshan Canyon =

Landform in Anhui, China

Zhangshan Canyon (鄣山大峡谷) is located in Jixi County, Anhui Province, China. The most famous landmark is a special rock which looks like the face of former Chinese Communist Party chairman Mao Zedong.
