= Huang Qixiang =

Chinese military commander and statesman

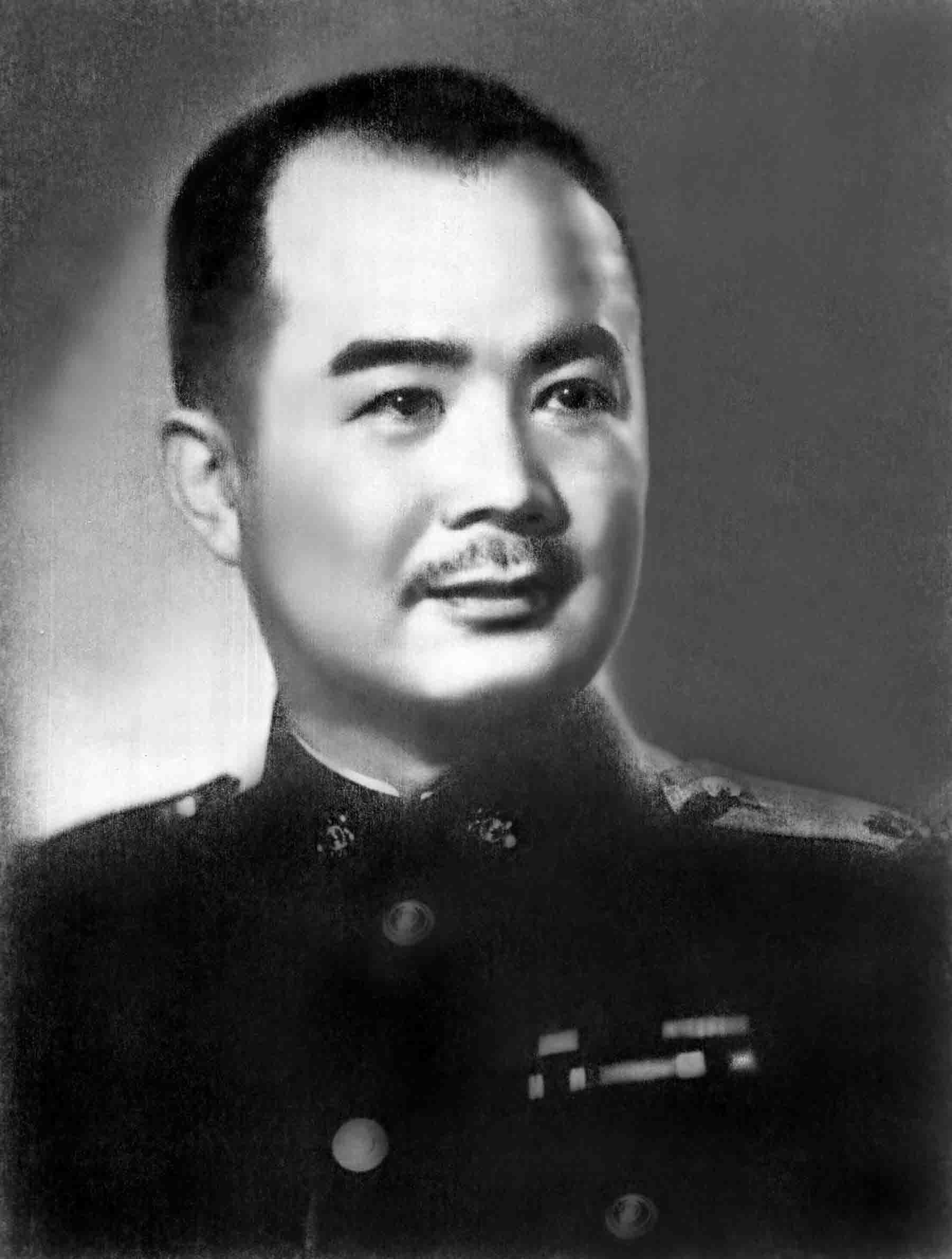
- Born: 2 September 1898 Meixian District, Guangdong
- Died: 10 December 1970 (aged 72)
- Allegiance: Republic of China
- Branch: National Revolutionary Army
- Conflicts: Northern Expedition; Second Sino-Japanese War

Huang Qixiang (Chinese: 黃琪翔; Wade–Giles: Huang Chi-hsiang; 2 September 1898 – 10 December 1970) was a Chinese military commander and statesman. He led the Chinese Action Committee for National Liberation in 1933 during the short-lived People's Revolutionary Government of the Republic of China.

Huang was a recipient of the Order of Blue Sky and White Sun.
