= Wang Jingjiu =

Chinese general (1902-1964)

- 王敬久
- Born: 9 August 1902; Feng County, Jiangsu, Qing China
- Died: 20 June 1964 (aged 61); Tainan, Taiwan
- Military career
- Allegiance: Republic of China
- Branch: National Revolutionary Army; Republic of China Army
- Service years: 1924–1949
- Rank: Lieutenant general
- Commands: 87th Division
- Conflicts: Northern Expedition; January 28 incident Fujian Rebellion: Second Sino-Japanese War; Battle of Shanghai; Battle of Nanjing; Battle of Wuhan; Battle of Nanchang; Zhejiang-Jiangxi campaign; Battle of West Hubei; Battle of West Hunan; Chinese Civil War; Menglianggu Campaign

Wang Jingjiu (Chinese: 王敬久; pinyin: Wáng Jìngjiǔ; Wade–Giles: Wang Ching-chiu; 9 August 1902 – 20 June 1964) was a general of the Republic of China during the Second Sino-Japanese War and the Chinese Civil War. He was a commander of the German-trained 87th Division.

== Biography ==
Wang was born in Feng County, Jiangsu. He joined the first class of the Kuomintang's Whampoa Military Academy and participated in the Northern Expedition. He commanded the 87th Division and was engaged in the first phase of the Chinese Civil War and the suppression of the Chahar People's Anti-Japanese Army and the Fujian Rebellion in 1933. His division became one of the German trained divisions formed in the National Revolutionary Army in 1936–37. The 87th Division fought under the 71st Corps at the Battle of Shanghai and the Battle of Nanjing. He commanded the 25th Corps in the Battle of Wuhan in 1938 and in the Battle of Nanchang in 1939. He later commanded the 10th Army Group in the Zhejiang-Jiangxi campaign, the Battle of West Hubei, and the Battle of West Hunan.

After the end of the war with Japan, Wang returned to the commander-in-chief of the 32nd Army Group, preparing to clear out the Communists in Jiangsu and Anhui. Later, he was transferred to the commander of the 2nd Corps but left this post after the failure of the Menglianggu campaign.

He left for Taiwan in 1949 and became a professor at the National Defense University. He died in Tainan in 1964.
