= Shen Fazao =

Chinese general (1904–1973)

- 沈發藻
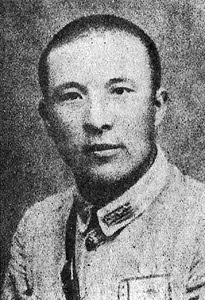
- Born: 8 October 1904; Dayu County, Jiangxi, Qing China
- Died: 4 February 1973 (aged 68); Taipei, Taiwan
- Military career
- Allegiance: Republic of China
- Branch: National Revolutionary Army; Republic of China Army
- Service years: 1924–1959
- Rank: Lieutenant general
- Commands: 87th Division
- Conflicts: Northern Expedition; January 28 incident Fujian Rebellion: Second Sino-Japanese War; Battle of Shanghai; Battle of Nanjing; Battle of Lanfeng; Fourth Battle of Changsha

Shen Fazao (traditional Chinese: 沈發藻; simplified Chinese: 沈发藻; pinyin: Shěn Fāzǎo; Wade–Giles: Shen Fa-tsao; 8 October 1904 - 4 February 1973) was a Chinese National Revolutionary Army general who commanded the 87th Division during the Second Sino-Japanese War.

== Biography ==
Shen was born in Dayu County, Jiangxi in 1904. He entered the Whampoa Military Academy in 1924 and participated in the Northern Expedition. He was assigned to the 87th Division and participated in the January 28 incident and the suppression of the Fujian Rebellion. In 1936, he was promoted to major general.

On 3 September 1937, Shen became deputy commander of the 87th Division, he became the new division commander during the Battle of Nanjing. By the end of the battle, the 87th Division was reduced to a mere 300 men of its original 14,000, although the division was still highly regarded by Chinese commanders. In 1939, Shen became deputy commander of the 2nd Army, he was promoted to acting commander when the Japanese army launched Operation Ichi-Go in the spring of 1944. He was promoted to lieutenant general in 1948.

During the Chinese Civil War, Shen was given command of the 23rd and 70th Armies, and commanded their withdrawal to Taiwan in 1949. He became deputy commander-in-chief of the Republic of China Army in 1953. He retired in June 1959. In 1967, he became a member of the Mainland Restoration Research Committee.

He died in Taipei on 4 February 1973.
