= Route Army =

Chinese military organization

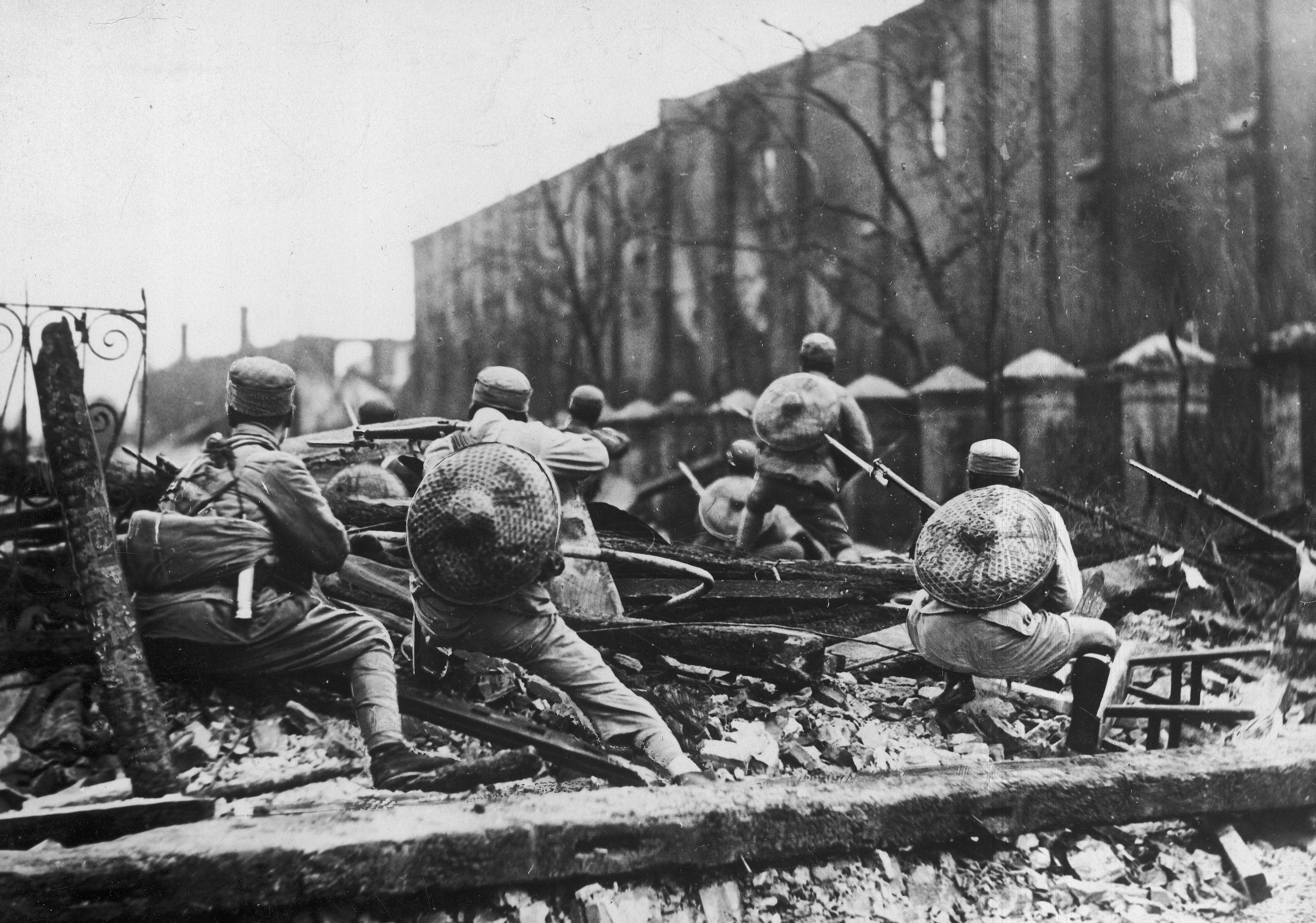
19th Route Army troops during the January 28th incident

A Route Army (路軍/路军), was a type of military organization during the first Republic of China, and usually exercised command over two or more corps or a large number of divisions or independent brigades. It was a common formation in China prior to the Second Sino-Japanese War but was discarded as a formation type by the National Revolutionary Army after 1938 (other than the 8th Route Army), in favor of the Group Army.

Some of the more famous of the Route Armies were:

- 8th Route Army: Chinese Communist force in North China. Famous for their victory in the Battle of Pingxingguan in 1937. Eventually merged into the East China Field Army in January 1947.
- 19th Route Army: Defended Shanghai in 1932 during the January 28 Incident. They eventually turned against Chiang Kai-shek and rebelled in Fujian with the Chinese Communist Party. They were disbanded in 1934 for disloyalty.
- 29th Route Army: Defended the Hubei-Chahar area. They fought the Japanese during the Marco Polo Bridge incident and the Battle of Beiping–Tianjin in 1937. They disbanded later in the same year in favor of a more restructured army system.
- First Route Army: One of the route armies under the Northeast Anti-Japanese United Army. They participated in the Battle of Pochonbo in 1937 and conducted guerrilla warfare in Southern Manchuria. After facing almost total annihilation by the Japanese and puppet troops, remaining First Route Army members defected to the Soviet Union, eventually forming the 88th International Brigade in 1942.
