= Battle of Jinan (1930) =

Battle in China

- Part of the Central Plains War
| Date | August 14, 1930 |
| Location | Jinan, Shandong |
| Result | Central Army victory |

Belligerents
| National Revolutionary Army Central Army | Anti-Chiang forces |

Commanders and leaders
| Jiang Guangnai; Cai Tingkai; Chen Cheng | Fu Zuoyi; Li Shengda; Li Fujuan |

The Battle of Jinan was between the forces of Chiang Kai-shek and those of his opponents. Fu Zuoyi abandoned Jinan and the National Revolutionary Army entered the city on August 15.
