= 87th Division (National Revolutionary Army) =

- An 87th Division ZB vz. 26 light machine gun crew, Shanghai, 1937 (note their German M1935 Stahlhelm)
- Country: Republic of China
- Branch: (Republic of China (1912–1949)) National Revolutionary Army
- Type: Infantry
- Size: 14,000
- Garrison/HQ: Nanjing
- Engagements: Second Sino-Japanese War; Battle of Shanghai; Burma Campaign; Chinese Civil War; Campaign to Defend Siping; Siping Campaign

Commanders
- Ceremonial chief: Chiang Kai-shek
- Notable commanders: Wang Jingjiu; Shen Fazao

Insignia
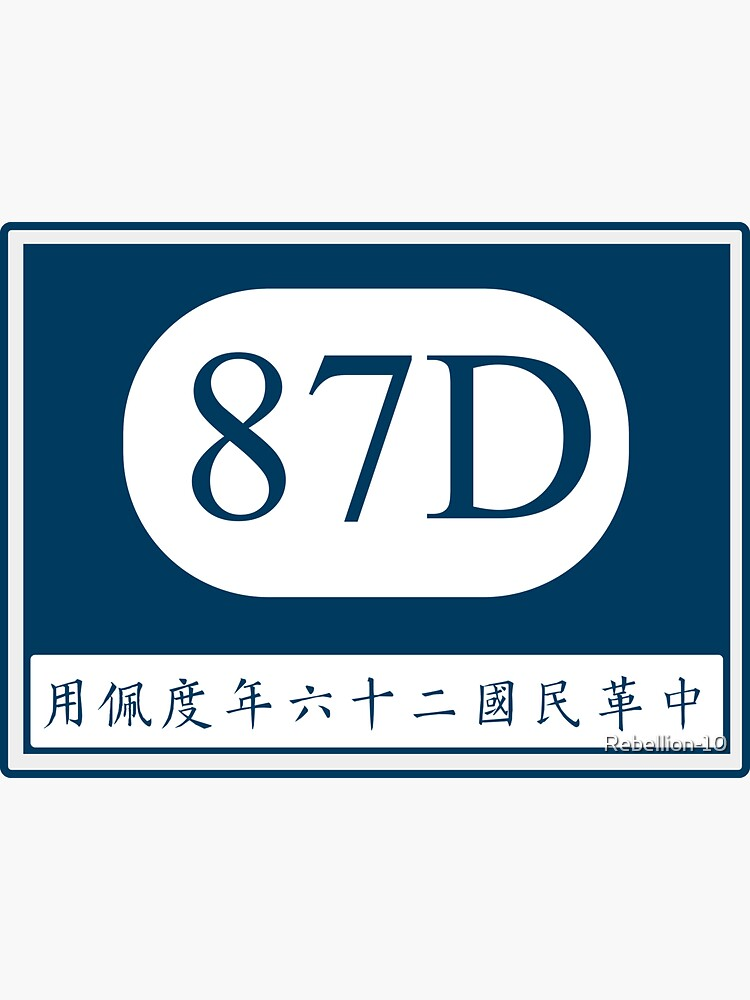
- Divisional Arm badge

The 87th Division was one of the eight elite infantry division unit that was fully German-trained and reorganized in the Republic of China's National Revolutionary Army (NRA), which was active during the Second Sino-Japanese War. As one of Chiang Kai-shek's elite divisions that received training from German instructors as part of a program of reorganizing the Chinese army, it and its sister 88th Division were regarded as the Chinese Nationalist government's best units.

The 87th Division notable for taking part in the Battle of Shanghai in the summer and fall of 1937. Prior to that it had fought in Shanghai against the Japanese during the January 28 Incident in 1932, and following the second engagement in 1937 the division saw action during the Battle of Nanjing and the Burma Campaign. After Japan's surrender, the 87th Division then fought in the Chinese Civil War against the Communists and was dissolved after the conflict.

== History ==
The 87th Division came into existence in the early 1930s as part of a plan formulated by the German military advisors working with Chinese leader Chiang Kai-shek to restructure the National Revolutionary Army into a small core of elite units, with the rest of its troops being placed into local militia units. The 87th Division was one of the small number of units that received training from German instructors before the German government ordered them to return home as part of their alliance with Japan. Regarded along with its sister 88th Division as one of the best units of the Nationalist Army, the troops of the 87th were equipped entirely with the German M1935 Stahlhelm. Not long after its formation the 87th Division took part in the combat against the Japanese in Shanghai during the January 28 Incident in 1932, as part of the 5th Army, and was later stationed in Nanjing. Throughout its existence the 87th Division served as part of the 71st Corps.

Later in 1937 the 87th Division took part in the Battle of Shanghai at the outbreak of the war between the Republic of China and the Empire of Japan. When Zhang Zhizhong, 71st Corps commander, ordered the 87th and 88th—equipped with their German helmets and stick grenades—to move into the city the former used trucks to quickly deploy into downtown Shanghai. It was commanded by Lieutenant General Wang Jingjiu during the battle. On August 14, the unit advanced against the Kung-ta Textile Mill, where the Japanese Special Naval Landing Force troops were based. During the battle it also cooperated with the 88th Division. They jointly advanced against SNLF forces at the Huishan wharf on August 17, and on the following day the 87th broke through Japanese lines at Yangshupu district, linking up with the 88th Division.

On August 23 the Shanghai Expeditionary Army landed in Chuansha, Liuhe, and Wusong. The 62nd regiment of the 11th division and the 2nd regiment of the Training Division blocked the Japanese army at Wusong and quickly suffered heavy casualties. Thus, on August 24, the 87th division sent a regiment of the 261st brigade in junction with 212th regiment of the 36th division to Zhanghuabang (張華浜) while the 2nd regiment of the Training Division withdrew, cooperating with the 61st division to block the Japanese advance there. On August 29, Colonel Tatsuji Kuranaga (倉永辰治), commander of the 6th infantry regiment of the 3rd division, was killed in the direction of the three Chinese divisions. The 261st brigade would continue fighting the Japanese army at the south bank of Wusong until September 11 when the Central Wing Force retreated from the landing positions. By this point, the 87th division had suffered approximately 3,423 killed or wounded out of its 9,500 troops and would be supplemented with 793 officers and soldiers from a Zhejiang security regiment.

Starting from October 1, the 87th division defended the east bank of Wenzaobang (蕰藻浜) with the 36th division and 61st division. On October 11, Colonel Karuo Kano (加納治雄), commander of the 101st infantry regiment of the 101st division, was killed facing the three divisions. By October 24, the Left Wing army had to retreat from Wenzaobang. The 3rd division, 18th division, and 87th division, and a brigade of the 36th division were tasked with defending Dachang (大場) and the surrounding areas. In the early morning of October 26, the Japanese army launched a general attack at the city. Despite the efforts of the defenders, Dachang was lost by the evening and the Chinese divisions had to retreat further.

In late October, the division moved out to the west of Shanghai to the Suzhou Creek. Being as wide as a river, it was an obstacle that the Japanese needed to secure in order to surround Chinese forces in Shanghai in a massive pocket. On November 1, the Japanese 9th division at the west side of the Suzhou River succeeded in crossing the river, quickly breaking through the position of the 61st division and capturing Wujiaku (吳家庫). The 261st brigade of the 87th division was ordered to reinforce the 61st division and attempted to retake Wujiaku, but the counterattacks were unsuccessful. The 46th division and 67th division were thus also ordered to assist the two divisions in consolidating the defense lines.

According to the recollection of Chen Yiding (陳頤鼎), commander of the 261st brigade, the 87th division was replenished four times each with 2,000 and 3,000 soldiers in the three-month battle and upwards of 16,000 members of the division were killed or wounded (including replacements for the losses). According to divisional commander Wang Jingjiu's report on November 1, the unit had suffered more than 6,000 casualties including 200 officers (likely not including casualties of the replacements). Subsequently, the unit took part in the Battle of Nanjing, by which point it received Major General Shen Fazao as its new commander. By the time the engagement at Nanjing was over, barely 300 soldiers of the division were still alive, but despite having lost many of its original personnel it still had an elite aura in the eyes of many Chinese commanders.

In May 1938, the division participated in the battle of Lanfeng, suffering more than 4,000 killed or wounded and more than 300 missing. In September 1938, the division participated in the battle of Wuhan. The division defended Shawo Town (沙窩鎮) alongside the 61st division and 88th division of the 71st corps and the 2nd army group against the Japanese 13th and 16th divisions. In the battle of Wuhan, the 13th and 16th divisions suffered a total of 5,916 killed or wounded, of which the battles of Fujin Mountain (富金山) and Shawo accounted for a large portion of the casualties. However, the Chinese army also suffered heavy casualties in the two battles. By the end of the battle of Shawo, the 71st corps and 2nd army group each had only approximately 4,000 combat soldiers left.

Despite having suffered heavy casualties in subsequent battles, the 87th division was highly regarded by the Japanese army. In its assessment of the Chinese army in March 1940, the Japanese army put the combat effectiveness of the 87th division at 'A+'. Out of the 217 divisions from 11 military fronts of the National Revolutionary Army that were rated by the Japanese army, the 36th and 88th divisions of the 71st corps were the only other two divisions with 'A+' combat effectiveness. In April 1940, the 71st corps participated in the battle of Southern Shanxi, fighting around the Gaoping area before withdrawing for reorganization in May. In the July assessment for the Chinese army, the Japanese army judged that the 87th division had suffered relatively light losses and put its combat effectiveness at 'A-'.

In May–June 1944 the unit took part, along with its sister 88th Division, in the Burma Campaign, where it saw action along the Burma Road as part of Wei Lihuang's Chinese Expeditionary Force. When their offensive against the Japanese-held town of Longling failed, the 87th Division commander Major General Zhang Shaoxun almost committed suicide. Around this time it was briefly commanded by Major General Huang Yen before Zhang resumed command in 1945. In June 1945, the 36th, 87th, 88th, and honorary 1st divisions were awarded the Flying Tiger Flag for the recapture of Longling.

After the surrender of Japan in 1945, the 87th Division took part in the Chinese Civil War. During the civil war it notably fought in northeastern China (Manchuria) against the Communists under Lin Biao, in the second and third battles of Siping (1946–47). Reportedly many of the 87th Division troops consisted of new recruits that only had one week's training. The Communists fought the 87th Division at Nong'an in March 1946, and later it fought in defense of the city of Siping with the 54th Division in June, under the command of Chen Mingren. Despite multiple Communist offensives into the city the Nationalist line held, although the brunt of the casualties were taken by the 87th.

== Sources ==
=== Literature ===
- Boorman, Howard L.; Cheng, Joseph K. H. (1967). Biographical Dictionary of Republican China, Volume 3. Columbia University Press. ISBN 978-0231089579.
- Felton, Mark (2013). China Station: The British Military in the Middle Kingdom, 1839–1997. Pen and Sword. ISBN 978-1473829602.
- Harmsen, Peter (2013). Shanghai 1937: Stalingrad on the Yangtze. Casemate. ISBN 978-1612001685.
- Harmsen, Peter (2015). Nanjing 1937: Battle for a Doomed City. Casemate. ISBN 978-1612002842.
- Lew, Christopher R. (2011). The Third Chinese Revolutionary Civil War, 1945–49: An Analysis of Communist Strategy and Leadership. Routledge. ISBN 978-0415673860.
- Romanus, Charles F.; Sunderland, Riley (1987) [1956]. China-Burma-India Theater: Stilwell's Command Problems. Department of the Army. ISBN 978-0160019142.
- Woo, X. L. (2014). Two Republics in China: How Imperial China Became the PRC. Algora Publishing. ISBN 978-1628940978.
