= Premier Chen =

Premier Chen may refer to:

- Chen Cheng (1898-1965), 5th and 7th Premier of the Republic of China
- Chen Chien-jen (born 1951), 31st Premier of the Republic of China
- Chen Mingshu (1889-1965), Acting Premier of the Republic of China
- Sean Chen (politician) (born 1949), 24th Premier of the Republic of China
