= Yu Zhenying =

Chinese politician

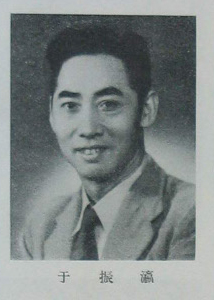

Member of the Legislative Yuan
- In office 1948–1949
- Constituency: Shaanxi

Personal details
- Born: 1902
- Died: May 22, 1960 (aged 57–58)
- Spouse: Chen Jianchen

Yu Zhenying (1902 – 22 May 1960), born Yu Fangdan (方單), courtesy name Haicheng (海澄), and better known by his art name Zhenying (振瀛), was a Chinese politician from Shaanxi, he was one of the founders of the Three Principles of the People Comrades Association and served as a standing member of the 2nd, 3rd, and 4th Central Committees of the Revolutionary Committee of the Chinese Kuomintang.

== Biography ==
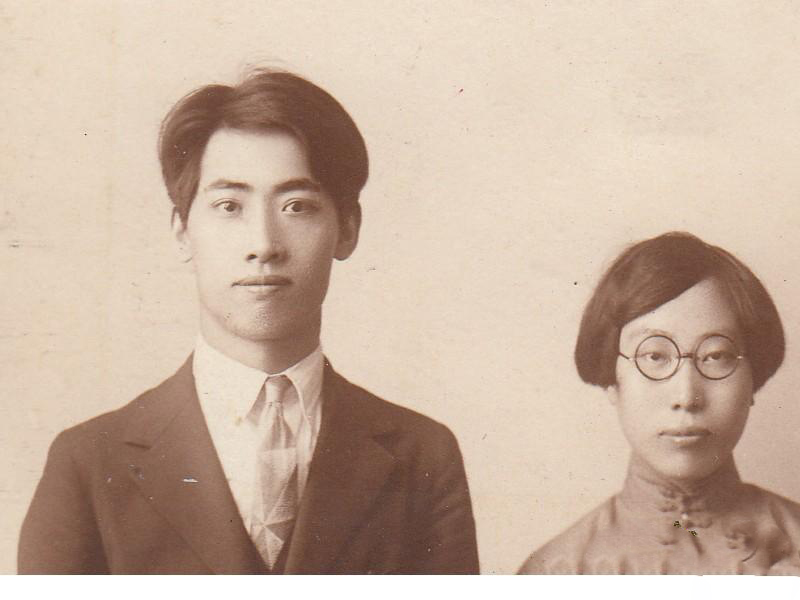
Yu and his wife, Chen Jianchen

Yu was born in 1902 in Shanxi, his father was a member of Tongmenghui, he later married to Chen Jianchen.

In 1926, Yu was appointed chairman of the Shaanxi Provincial Executive Committee of the Kuomintang (KMT). Following the Shanghai massacre in 1927, he broke with Chiang Kai-shek's leadership and organized cadre training programs in Shaanxi aimed at cultivating politically committed youth. He was subsequently arrested and imprisoned by the Chiang government.

In 1929, Yu was released through the intervention of Song Zheyuan, then chairman of Shaanxi Province. He traveled to Japan later that year and pursued further studies at Waseda University.

Beginning in 1935, Yu secretly began working for the Chinese Communist Party (CCP). In 1936, he served as a political aide to Song Zheyuan in Beiping, where he advocated resistance to Japanese pressure and opposed what he viewed as conciliatory tendencies within the Nationalist government in Nanjing.

In the spring of 1939, Yu was transferred to Chongqing and appointed an instructor for the Second and Eighth War Areas under the Wartime Party and Government Affairs Committee led by Li Jishen. In June of that year, he conducted inspection tours in Shaanxi, Shanxi, and Suiyuan amid frequent Nationalist–Communist frictions and negotiations, as North China had become the primary theater of the war against Japan.

In January 1940, as part of mediation efforts by the committee, Yu traveled to northwestern Shanxi to meet with CCP commanders He Long and Guan Xiangying. The talks focused on reducing armed clashes between Nationalist and CCP forces and preventing the outbreak of a broader internal conflict involving Chiang Kai-shek and Yan Xishan.

Later that year, Yu returned to Xi'an and headed the Xi'an office of the Wartime Party and Government Affairs Committee until its dissolution in the winter of 1941. He then returned to Chongqing and, upon the recommendation of Ding Weifen, was appointed secretary of the KMT Pacification Committee.

During the late 1940s, Yu became involved in intra-KMT factional politics. His activities contributed to heightened tensions between Zhu Jiahua and the CC Clique, while also facilitating tactical cooperation between the Zhu faction and the Three Principles of the People Youth League.

In 1947, Yu was elected to the First Legislative Yuan and continue to work for CCP. In 1948, together with Liu Zhongrong, Liu Zhonghua, and Tan Tiwu, he played a role in intensifying political competition between Li Zongren of the Guangxi clique and Sun Fo of the Chiang Kai-shek faction during the vice-presidential election. These developments further exacerbated divisions between Chiang Kai-shek and Li Zongren. Yu also used to support of Sun Fo, but start to against Sun when he allied with Chiang.

Following the Nationalist defeat in the Huaihai Campaign, Li Zongren forced Chiang Kai-shek to resign from the presidency, creating expanded political space for opposition activities. Within the Legislative Yuan, Yu joined Li Renren, Tan Tiwu, Chen Jianchen, and others in forming the Three Principles of the People Comrades Association Political Action Group, which sought to exploit internal KMT divisions through legislative proposals, interpellations, public statements, and organized forums that criticized the Nationalist government.

After the establishment of the People's Republic of China, Yu Zhenying took part in political campaigns targeting perceived ideological deviations within the Revolutionary Committee of the Chinese Kuomintang (RCCK), particularly during the Anti-Rightist Campaign. Serving as a deputy director of the RCCK Central Rectification Office under Xiong Kewu, Yu participated in internal investigations and criticism sessions directed at senior party members.

During a rectification meeting in 1957, Yu publicly criticized Chen Mingshu, accusing him of maintaining anti-Communist views and of engaging in inappropriate contacts with former Nationalist intelligence figures, including Zheng Jiemin, during and after the Huaihai Campaign. Yu alleged that Chen had attempted to introduce Zheng into Minlian-affiliated political activities, concealed the dispatch of former Military Statistics Bureau agents under Minlian auspices, and maintained contacts with foreign representatives such as U.S. diplomat John Leighton Stuart. Yu cited these actions as evidence of Chen's ideological opposition to Communist participation in democratic parties.

Yu Zhenying died of esophageal cancer in Beijing on 22 May 1960. A public memorial service was held on 25 May at Jiaxing Temple, presided over by Cai Tingkai, with a eulogy delivered by Zhu Yunshan. Attendees included Zhang Zhizhong, Shao Lizi, Chen Shaoxian, representatives of the CCP United Front Work Department, leaders of other democratic parties, RCCK officials in Beijing, and more than 300 associates. Yu was buried at the Babaoshan Revolutionary Cemetery in Beijing.
