= Productive People's Party =

Chinese leftist political party, 1933–1934

Productive People's Party 生產人民黨
- General Secretary: Chen Mingshu
- Founded: 24 November 1933
- Dissolved: Mid-January 1934
- Split from: Kuomintang
- Succeeded by: Chinese Peasants' and Workers' Democratic Party
- Headquarters: Fuzhou (1933); British Hong Kong (1934)
- Membership: 200+
- Ideology: Anti-imperialism; Chinese nationalism Left wing nationalism

Flag of the Fujian People's Government

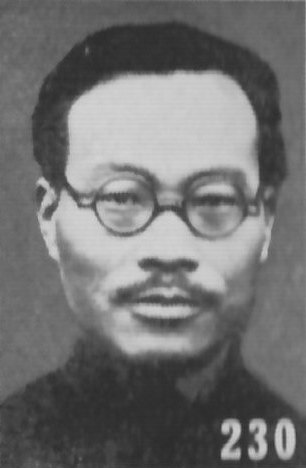
General Secretary Chen Mingshu.

The Productive People's Party (simplified Chinese: 生产人民党; traditional Chinese: 生產人民黨; pinyin: Shēngchǎn rénmín dǎng; Wade–Giles: Sheng^{1}-ch'an^{3} jen^{2}-min^{2} tang^{3}) was a short-lived leftist political party formed during the Fujian Rebellion in November 1933. It was formed by officers of the National Revolutionary Army's 19th Route Army. They were disaffected by Chiang Kai-shek's domination of both the Kuomintang and the Republic of China. The party's general secretary was Chen Mingshu.

The party’s platform consisted of anti-imperialism, especially against Japan, democracy, overthrow of Chiang and the right-wing of the Kuomintang, rule of the workers and peasants, along with land reform.

When the rebellion collapsed in January 1934, the party fled to Hong Kong where it self-dissolved. It was succeeded by the Chinese Peasants' and Workers' Democratic Party.
