= German-trained divisions of the National Revolutionary Army =

Elite Chinese army units

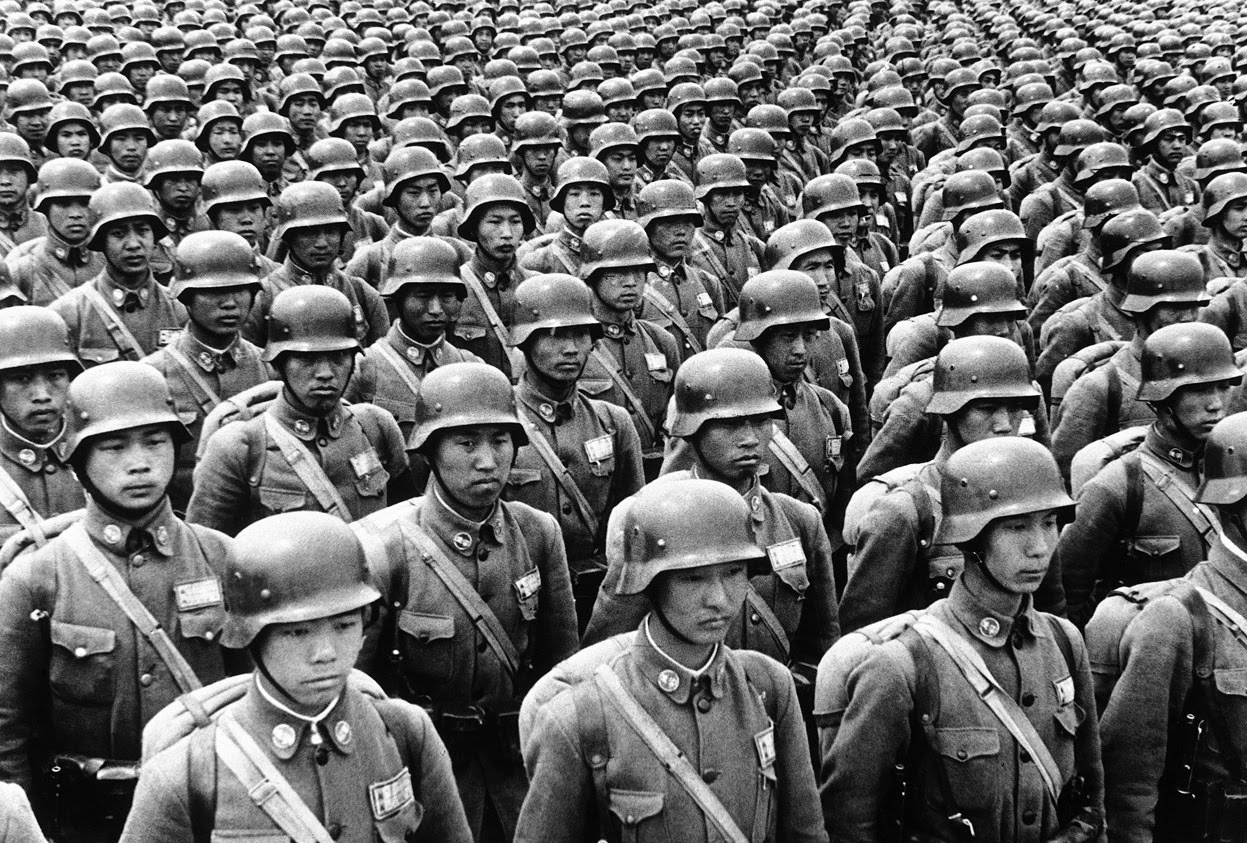
German-trained Chinese soldiers before the Battle of Wuhan

The German-trained divisions (Chinese: 德械師; lit. 'German-equipped divisions') were elite infantry divisions in the National Revolutionary Army (NRA), which were trained and partially equipped by the Weimar Republic and Nazi Germany under Sino-German cooperation. These units saw service during the Chinese Civil War, Central Plains War, and the Second Sino-Japanese War.

== Background ==
In 1927, after the dissolution of the First United Front between the Kuomintang (KMT) and the Chinese Communist Party (CCP), the KMT purged its leftist members and Soviet influence from its ranks, including its Soviet advisors. In early 1928, it began turning to the Weimar Republic for assistance in the Republic of China's modernization efforts.

The Weimar Republic sent advisors to China, but because of the restrictions imposed by the Treaty of Versailles, they could not serve in military capacities. When Adolf Hitler became the Chancellor of Germany in 1933 and disregarded the treaty, the Nazi Party and the KMT were soon engaged in cooperation, with Germany assisting in China's military and economic modernization, while China opened its markets and natural resources to Germany.

== History ==
=== Central Plains War ===
During the Central Plains War, German-trained units under Chiang Kai-shek participated in the campaigns against Feng Yuxiang and Yan Xishan in 1930.

=== Encirclement Campaigns ===
In 1931, German-trained units participated in the third encirclement campaign against the Jiangxi Soviet.

=== 60 Division Plan ===
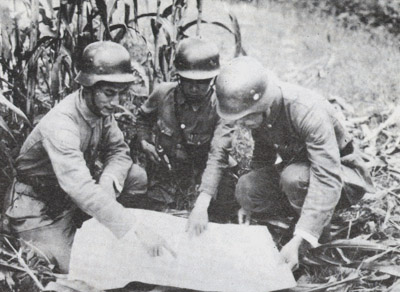
Chinese officers with German equipment during the Battle of Shanghai.

In 1932, Georg Wetzell, acting as the head of the German military mission in China, proposed raising several "model divisions" organized along German lines to give insights into establishing a small, elite core of well-trained and well-equipped divisions for the NRA. By 1933, this structure would be applied to the 36th, 87th, and 88th divisions, which were trained and equipped by the Germans. The 21st Year (1932) Type divisional organization proposed by Wetzell would eventually form the basis of the later 24th Year (1935) New Type divisional organization used in the 60 Division Plan.

In December 1934, the Army Reorganization Office of the Military Affairs Commission (MAC), with advice from the German military mission led by Alexander von Falkenhausen, devised the National Army Reorganization Plan for 60 Divisions, or the 60 Division Plan, to raise 60 modernized New Divisions along German lines for the NRA's Central Army. The rest of the Central Army's divisions were to be reorganized into Reformed Divisions, which were intended for use as garrison and anti-banditry units during peacetime, and as a reserve force to replace New Division casualties during wartime. The enlisted personnel of both the New and Reformed divisions were to be drawn from a corresponding divisional district to strengthen unit cohesion and streamline recruitment. Their officers were to be recruited on a national basis and assigned randomly across units to break regionalist affiliations. This new force was intended to be directly accountable to Chiang Kai-shek, thereby strengthening his political and military authority.

The reorganization was to be conducted in six-month phases between 1935 and 1938:

- 1935: 6-10 divisions
- 1936: 16-20 divisions
- 1937: 20-30 divisions
- 1938: Remaining divisions

However, the plan soon ran into major logistical challenges, as China's domestic industry lacked the capability to produce the volume of artillery required for such a force, and German military imports also failed to meet expectations. As a result, mortars were adopted as substitutes.

By 1935, 10 divisions had been reorganized into New Divisions, and prior to the outbreak of the Second Sino-Japanese War in July 1937, a further 20 divisions were reorganized. However, these latter divisions suffered severe shortages of modern equipment, particularly artillery.

==== Organization ====
The 24th Year (1935) New Type divisional organization introduced under the 60 Division Plan was to be nearly equivalent to a Western infantry division, with its primary shortcoming being the absence of radio equipment. It was to be composed of approximately 9,000-10,000 personnel organized into:

- Division headquarters
- Two infantry brigades
  - Brigade headquarters
  - Two infantry regiments
    - Regiment headquarters
    - Three infantry battalions
    - Infantry support gun or mortar company
    - Signal company
    - Special Duty Platoon
  - Special Duty Platoon
- Artillery regiment (equipped with either field or mountain guns)
  - Regiment headquarters
  - Three artillery battalions
  - Special duty platoon
  - Signal battery
- Cavalry squadron
- Engineer battalion
- Signal battalion
- Transport battalion
- Special duty company

== See Also ==
- January 28 incident
- Battle of Shanghai
- Battle of Nanking
- Battle of Wuhan
