= Chen Mingshu =

Chinese general and politician (1889–1965)

- 陳銘樞
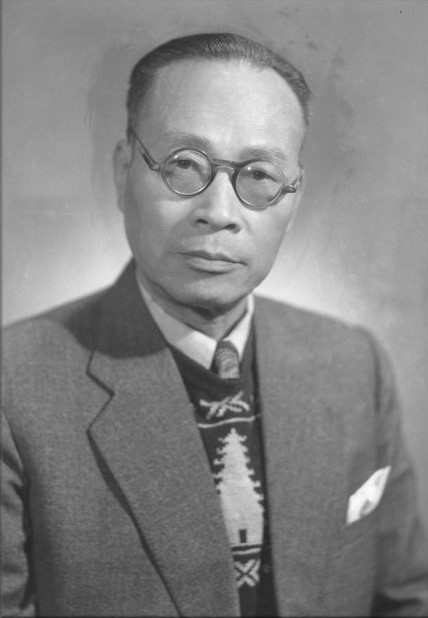
- Chen Mingshu in 1948

Acting Premier of China
- In office 15 December 1931 – 28 December 1931
- President: Lin Sen
- Vice Premier: Himself
- Preceded by: Chiang Kai-shek
- Succeeded by: Sun Fo

Vice Premier of China
- In office 16 December 1931 – 29 January 1932
- Premier: Himself (acting); Sun Fo
- Preceded by: T. V. Soong
- Succeeded by: T. V. Soong

Minister of Communications
- In office 1931 - 1932
- Preceded by: Wang Boqun
- Succeeded by: Zhu Jiahua

Personal details
- Born: 4 December 1899 Lianzhou, Guangdong, Qing dynasty
- Died: May 15, 1965 (aged 75) Beijing, China
- Party: Kuomintang 1919-1926, ?-1949; Social Democratic Party of China; Productive People's Party; Chinese Communist Party 1949-1957
- Education: Baoding Military Academy

Chen Mingshu (simplified Chinese: 陈铭枢; traditional Chinese: 陳銘樞; 4 December 1889 – 15 May 1965) was a Chinese general and politician. A Hakka from Hepu, Guangxi, he graduated from Baoding Military Academy and participated in the Northern Expedition. He was briefly premier after Chiang Kai-shek stepped down in December 1931. In 1932, he took part in the January 28 incident in Shanghai, defending the city against the Empire of Japan.

He was a member of Social Democratic Party of China.

He was one of the principal leaders of the Fujian Rebellion and the Productive People's Party (General Secretary), the failure of which forced him into exile in Hong Kong. Despite his involvement with the Fuijan Rebellion, Chen continued to be a member of the Kuomintang during Chiang's rule and returned to China before the end of the Chinese Civil War. Chen served as a representative of the Kuomintang and continued to represent the Republic of China, for example, as a representative of the KMT to Indian Prime Minister Jawaharlal Nehru during his visit to China.

In 1948, he joined the Revolutionary Committee of the Kuomintang's central standing committee. After the People's Republic of China was founded, he sat on the standing committees of the Chinese People's Political Consultative Conference and the National People's Congress. During the Anti-Rightist Movement, he was determined to be a "rightist".

Government offices
Preceded by Chiang Kai-shek	Premier of China; 1931	Succeeded by Sun Fo
