= Cai Tingkai =

Chinese general (1892–1968)

Cai Tingkai 蔡廷鍇
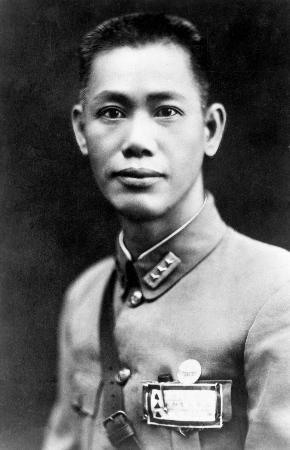
- Cai Tingkai (In 1930s)
- Born: 15 April 1892; Luoding, Guangdong, Qing dynasty
- Died: 25 April 1968 (aged 76); Beijing, People's Republic of China
- Military career
- Allegiance: Republic of China; People's Republic of China
- Rank: General
- Commands: 19th Route Army

Cai Tingkai (simplified Chinese: 蔡廷锴; traditional Chinese: 蔡廷鍇; pinyin: Cài Tíngkǎi; Wade–Giles: Ts‘ai^{4} T‘ing^{2}-k‘ai^{3}; Jyutping: Coi3 Ting4 Kaai2; 15 April 1892 – 25 April 1968) was a Chinese general.

== Life ==
Cai was in overall command of the 19th Route Army of the Republic of China's National Revolutionary Army and other Chinese forces responsible for holding off the Imperial Japanese Army during the Shanghai War of 1932 on 28 January 1932. In November 1933 Cai and fellow 19th Route Army officer Li Jishen rebelled against the ruling Kuomintang regime and, with Jiang Guangnai, established the Fujian People's Government on 22 November 1933. However, the rebellion—known as the Fujian Incident—did not receive Communist support and, on 21 January 1934, it was defeated by the Kuomintang and Cai was forced to leave China for several years.

Later, in the Second Sino-Japanese War (World War II), Cai returned to command the 26th Army Group in the Battle of South Guangxi. He also traveled to the United States to gain support from Chinese-Americans for the war effort.

During the final stages of the Chinese Civil War Cai supported the Chinese Communists and was a signatory of the "Proclamation of the Central People's Government of the People's Republic of China" of 1 October 1949.

Cai was originally interred at the Beijing Babaoshan Revolutionary Cemetery but, since 1997, his remains have been at the Memorial Mausoleum of the Martyrs of Nineteenth Route Army in the Battle Against Japanese Aggressors at North Shanghai.

== Military career ==
- 1927–1930 General Officer Commanding 10th Division
- 1930–1933 General Officer Commanding 19th Route Army
- 1939–1940 Commander in Chief 16th Army Group
- 1940–1945 Commander in Chief 26th Army Group
