= Persecution of Chinese people in Nazi Germany =

Treatment of Chinese in Nazi Germany

Many Chinese nationals and citizens who had remained in Nazi Germany were persecuted, especially during the war.

== Background ==
=== Chinese in Germany ===
Almost 3,000 Chinese lived in Germany when Hitler seized power in 1933. There is not a reliable source to prove the accurate number of Chinese persons. They were minority of the population of 63.3 million of Germans (stat. of Weimar government in 1925).

Many Chinese moved to Germany for education. Some came at the behest of their political party (KMT or CCP), while some came for learning science. The approximate number would be 200, 500 or 3000. The Chinese people lived in poor neighbourhoods, where social conflicts occurred, for example, in 1920, an "incident of Chinatown" drew the attention of c. 200 traders who lived near Schlesischer Bahnhof. The early reports of Chinese life in Hamburg focused on crime.

==== Students in university ====
Starting in the 1920s, university graduates of Chinese origin emerged in Berlin, and most of them adhered to a radical left-wing ideology. Zhu De, Liao Chengzhi and Zhou Enlai and others later became prominent leaders of the Chinese Communist Party. Others joined the Communist Party of Germany, and founded a saloon called "Circle for the Chinese language".

== Initial persecutions ==
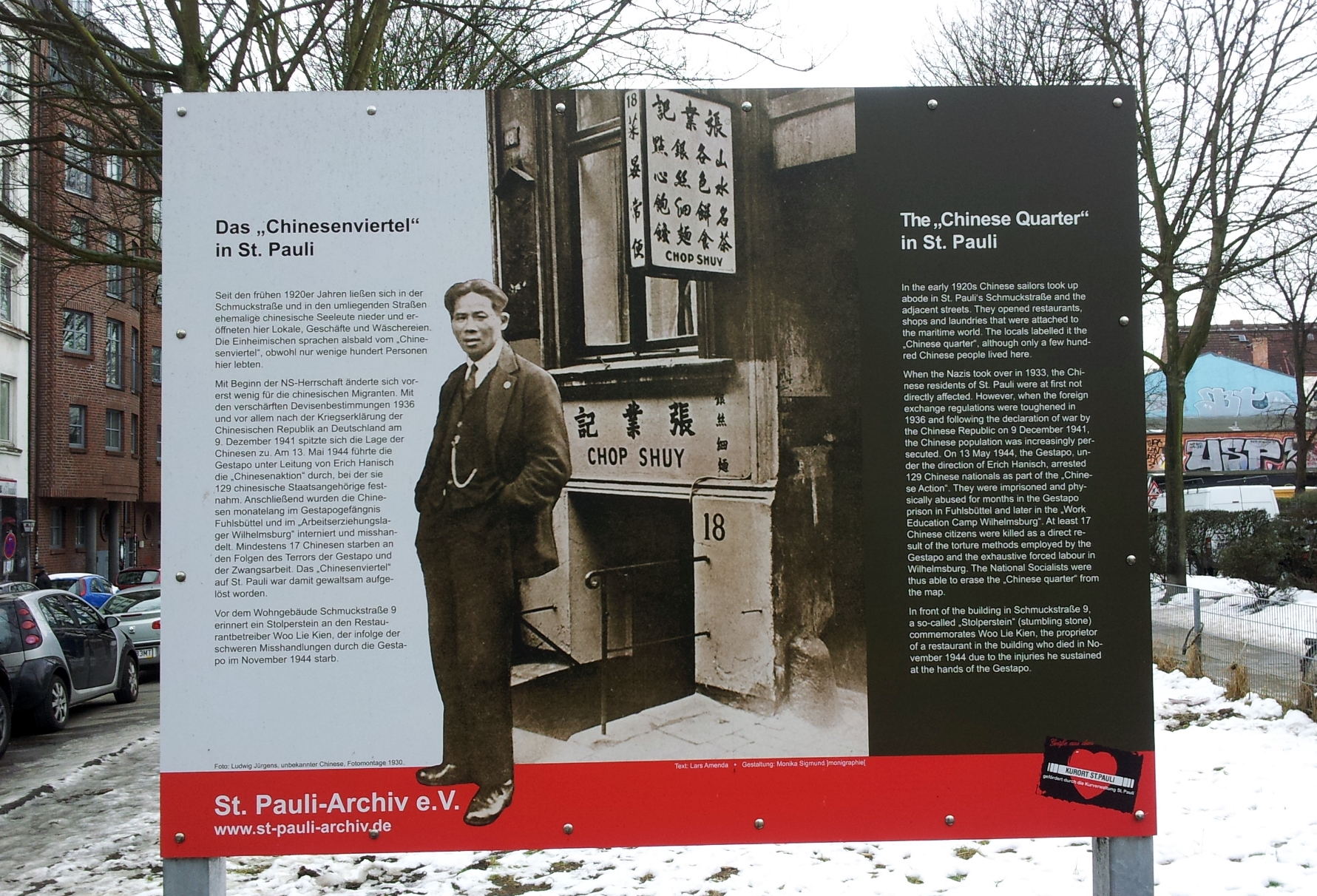
A memorial plaque on Schmuckstraße in Hamburg provides a brief history of the Chinese quarters in St. Pauli and its destruction by the Gestapo in 1944.

Initially the everyday life of Chinese people in Germany was unaffected by the Nazi government.

Later, Chinese people in Germany, some of whom adhered to a right-wing ideology, were targeted for persecution. Although most were not politically active, the government surveilled them. Under these circumstances, life became increasingly difficult for Chinese civilians in Germany. Beginning in 1936, Gestapo, local police and custom officers enforced regulations in Hamburg's Chinatown. On January 25, 1938, the Center for Chinese (Zentralstelle für Chinesen) was founded under the control of Reinhard Heydrich. It was dedicated to controlling the size of the Chinese population.

Many Chinese nationals were forced to leave Nazi Germany due to increased government surveillance and coercion. Most members of Germany's Chinese population chose to return to mainland China, but some chose to fight in the Spanish Civil War. According to a report by the Overseas Community Affairs Council, the Chinese population in Germany was reduced to 1,938 before the beginning of the Second World War. After the start of World War II and the subsequent collapse of Sino-German cooperation, the Gestapo launched mass arrests of Chinese Germans and Chinese nationals across Germany and sent many of them to labour camps. One Chinese person was sent to Auschwitz.

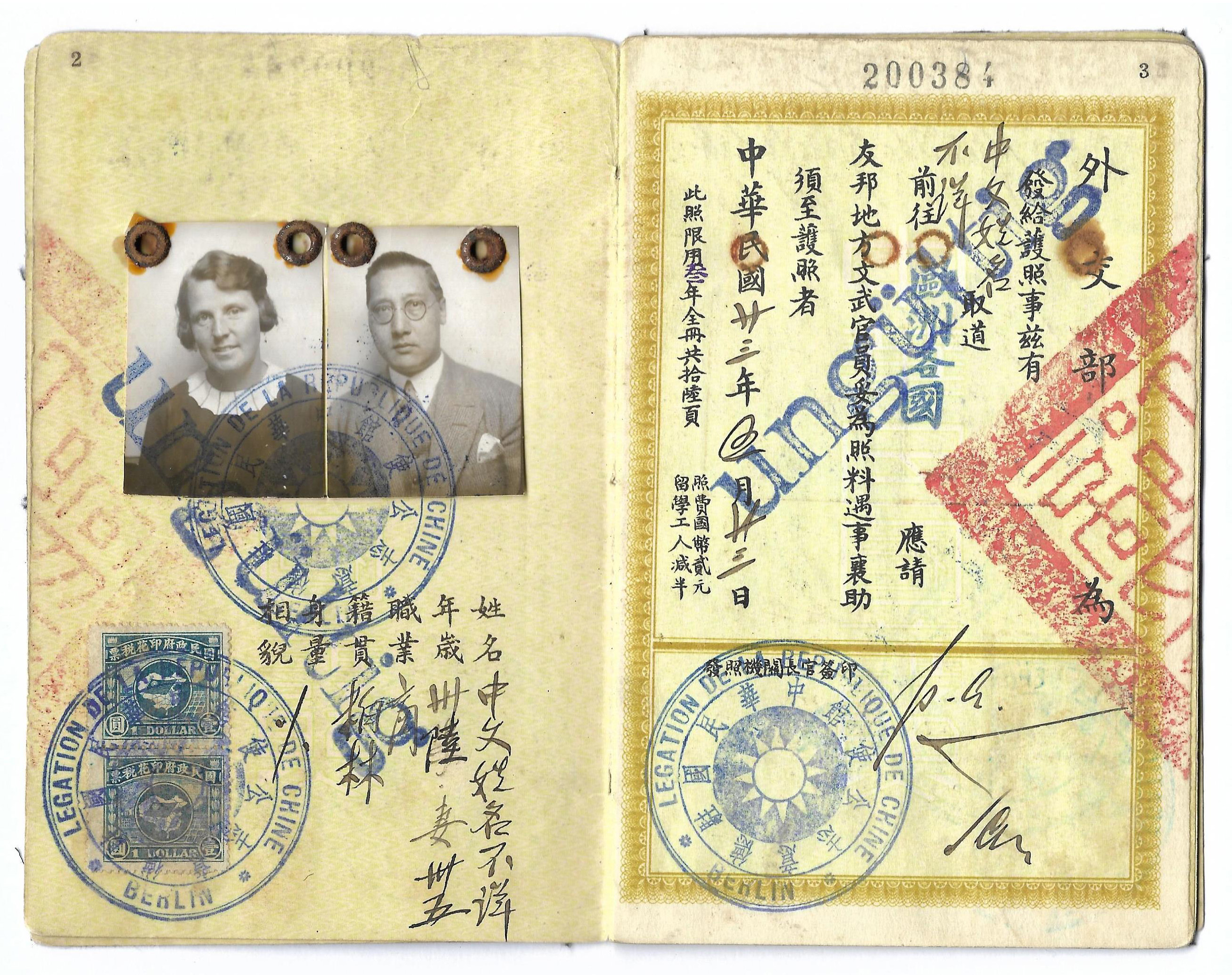
1934 Chinese passport issued in 1934 to a couple living in Berlin

== During the war ==
After the Chinese government declared war on Nazi Germany following the attack on Pearl Harbor in 1941, the Gestapo launched mass arrests of Chinese nationals across Germany, concentrating them in the Arbeitserziehungslager Langer Morgen (Langer Morgen Labour Camp) in Wilhelmsburg, Hamburg, and used them as forced labourers; 17 died in the process. In 1944, there were 165 Chinese arrested by Gestapo.

== Post-war ==
By the end of World War II, every Chinese restaurant in Hamburg had closed.

Only 148 Chinese people were identified as surviving the wartime persecution. Most chose to return to China, but a few decided to stay in Germany, including Zhang Tinlin, who had been imprisoned in several labour camps and concentration camps. After his release in Kiel, northern Germany, Zhang returned to what had been Hamburg's Chinatown, and opened the first Chinese restaurant and hotel in post-war Germany, running it until his death in the 1980. Called the "Hong Kong Bar", Zhang Xuefang (b. 1942), known as Marietta, his daughter with his Polish German partner, ran it until her death in 2021.

On June 28, 2021, the Stolpersteine project placed "stumbling blocks" recording the names of 13 Chinese victims of Nazi persecution in the street in Hamburg which was formerly the Chinatown area of the city.

== See also ==
- Internment of Japanese Americans
- Racial policy of Nazi Germany
- Anti-Chinese sentiment
