= Chen Jianchen =

Chinese university teacher and politician

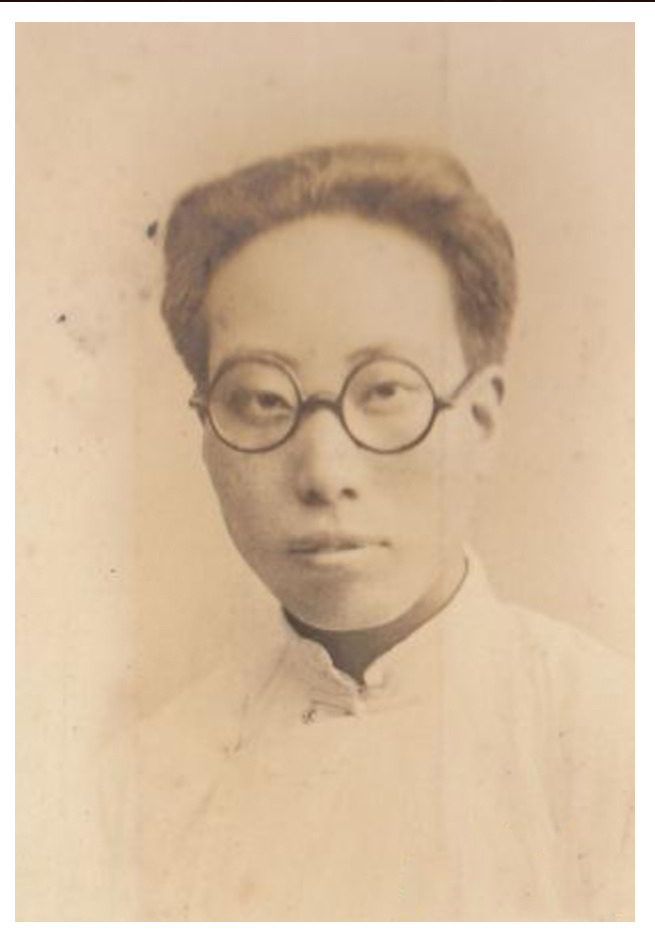

Member of the Legislative Yuan
- In office 1948–1949
- Constituency: Xi'an

Personal details
- Born: 27 January 1906
- Died: 16 October 1989 (aged 83)
- Spouse: Yu Zhenying

Chen Jianchen (Chinese: 陈建晨, 27 January 1906 – 16 October 1989) was a Chinese university teacher and politician. She was among the first group of women elected to the Legislative Yuan in 1948.

== Biography ==
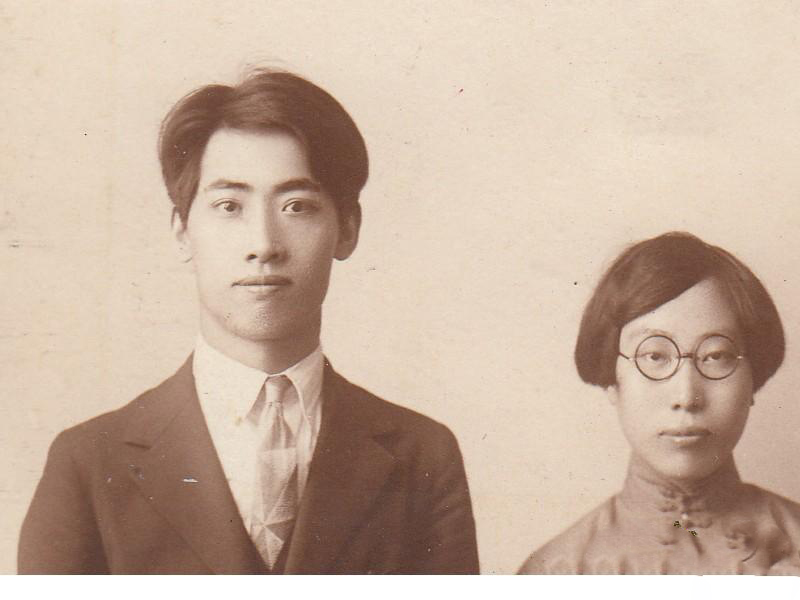
Chen and her husband, Yu Zhenying

Chen was born in Shang county in Shaanxi. She graduated from the economics department of Waseda University in Japan and subsequently taught at the University of China, Zhaoyang University, Xi'an Provisional University and Northwest Agricultural College. During the early phase of the Second Sino-Japanese War, she co-founded the bimonthly magazine Great Unity (大团结) and became a member of the Shaanxi Provincial Party Committee of the Kuomintang. In 1947 she joined the Chinese Democratic Revolutionary League.

She was subsequently elected to the Legislative Yuan in the 1948 elections and sat on the Finance and Banking Committee, the Budget Committee and the Labour Committee. After the establishment of the People's Republic of China in 1949, she served as a deputy Minister of Justice in the East China Military and Political Committee and vice president of the Higher People's Court in Jiangsu. She was a delegate to the sixth Chinese People's Political Consultative Conference and a member of the central committee of the Revolutionary Committee of the Chinese Kuomintang.
