= Jiang Guangnai =

Chinese politician (1888–1967)

- 蒋光鼐
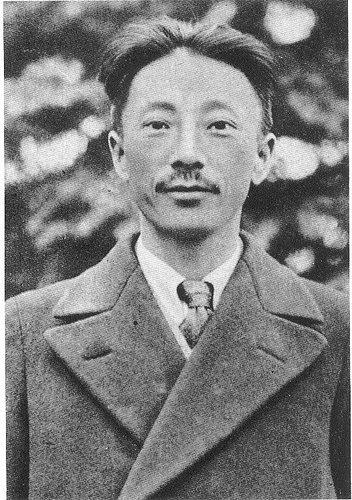

Governor of Fujian
- In office 7 December 1932 – 20 December 1933
- Preceded by: Yang Shu-chuang; Chen Nai-yuan (acting); Fang Sheng-tao (acting)
- Succeeded by: Chen Yi

Personal details
- Born: 17 December 1888 Dongguan, Guangdong
- Died: 8 June 1967 (aged 78) Beijing, People's Republic of China
- Party: Kuomintang

Military service
- Allegiance: Republic of China
- Rank: Lieutenant General
- Commands: 19th Route Army

Jiang Guangnai (simplified Chinese: 蒋光鼐; traditional Chinese: 蔣光鼐; pinyin: Jiǎng Guāngnài; Wade–Giles: Chiang Kuang-nai; Jyutping: Zoeng2 Gwong1 Naai5; 17 December 1888 – 8 June 1967) was a general and statesman in the Republic of China and the People's Republic of China, and was born in Dongguan, Guangdong.

== Defense of Shanghai ==
He became a bodyguard to Sun Yat-sen and, in 1932, was promoted to general and Commander in Chief of the 19th Route Army, leading it in the successful defense of Shanghai against Japanese invasion in the January 28 incident.

== Fujian Incident ==
After the cease-fire was brokered, the 19th Army was reassigned by Chiang Kai-shek to suppress Chinese Communist insurrection in Fujian. It won some battles against the Communists but then negotiated peace with them. Jiang Guangnai joined an insurrection that, on 22 November 1933, established a new People's Revolutionary Government of the Republic of China (Chinese: 中華共和國), free from the control of Chiang's Nanjing government. The new Fujian government was not supported by other warlords or by all elements of the communists and was quickly crushed by Chiang's armies in January 1934. Jiang escaped with his family to Hong Kong and the rest of the army was disbanded and reassigned into other units of the National Revolutionary Army.

== World War II ==
During WWII from 1939 to 1944 he returned to become Deputy Commander in Chief of the 4th War Area and in 1945 Deputy Commander in Chief of the 7th War Area.

== Later years ==
After the Communist victory, Mao assigned Jiang to be Minister of Textiles of the new People's Republic of China from 1950.

Most high-ranking officials struggled with the Red Guards during the Cultural Revolution. Jiang, however, was saved by Zhou Enlai. Zhou carefully and cleverly arranged for Jiang to join him and Mao Zedong on Tiananmen to inspect the Red Guards, some of whom had just stormed Jiang's home the previous day. During the inspection Jiang was positioned almost next to Mao. Zhou personally walked over to Jiang in front of the Red Guards, asking him how he was doing after the "visit" by the Red Guards the day before. In front of Mao, Jiang was quick to reply that the Red Guards were still relatively civilized. After that, they did not bother Jiang again. He died in 1967 in Beijing.

== Legacy ==
Jiang Guangnai's residence in Dongguan is now a museum. After his death, his daughter, Jiang Dinggui 蒋定桂 (b. 1947) became a worker in a textile factory, and features on the 5-jiao renminbi note issued in 1972. KTLA television reporter Liberté Chan is a descendant of Jiang Guangnai.
