= Social Democratic Party of China =

- Secretary: Wang Kien
- Founded: 1926?
- Ideology: Social democracy
- International affiliation: Labour and Socialist International

The Social Democratic Party of China was a political party, organized by Chinese immigrants in Europe. Wang Kien was elected secretary of the party at the party congress November 14, 1926. Yang Kantao, resident of Paris, also served as secretary of the party for a period. In the mid-1920s, the party was affiliated to the Labour and Socialist International.
