= China–Germany relations (1913–1941) =

The German Empire established diplomatic relations with the Republic of China in October 1913. After World War I and the creation of the Weimar Republic, Germany followed a policy of friendship towards China. Nazi Germany and the Nationalist government of the Republic of China maintained bilateral relations between 1933 and 1941. The Chinese Nationalists sought German military and economic support to help them consolidate control over factional warlords and resist Japanese imperialism. Germany sought raw materials such as tungsten and antimony from China.

During the mid-1930s, thousands of Chinese soldiers were trained by German officers and German economic investment made its way into China; however, Joachim von Ribbentrop strongly favored an alliance with Japan over one with China, and starting with the 1936 Anti-Comintern Pact, Germany began to realign its East Asia policy. After Japan invaded China in 1937 and Ribbentrop became Foreign Minister the following year, German aid to China was cut off. In July 1941, Nazi Germany severed relations with Nationalist China and transferred their recognition to the Japanese-controlled Wang Jingwei regime. However, after the attack on Pearl Harbor in 1941, China declared war on Germany. It was the second Chinese declaration of war against Germany in the 20th century.

== German Empire and China ==
Like the other major European powers, the German Empire was initially reluctant to grant recognition to the newly established Republic of China. It eventually did extend recognition in October 1913, after the inauguration of Yuan Shikai as the Republic's first president.

== Weimar Republic and China ==
Sino-Weimar Republic relations
- China: Germany

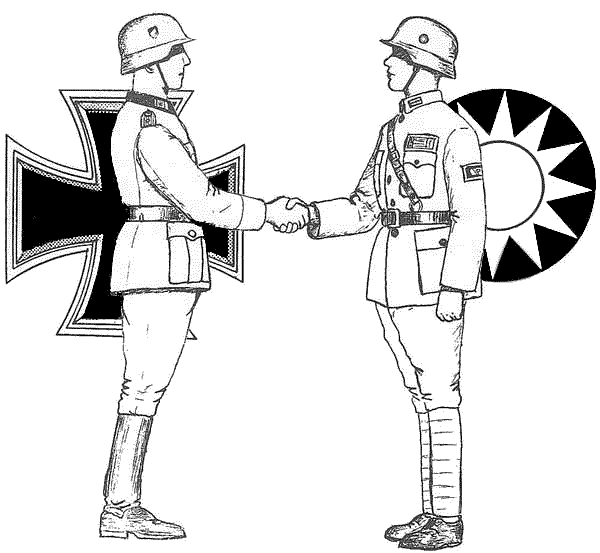
Chinese propaganda illustration (c. 1930) celebrating cooperation between its military and that of the German Weimar Republic

Under the terms of the Treaty of Versailles, the German Army had been restricted to 100,000 men, and its military-industrial production was greatly reduced. To circumvent the treaty's restrictions, German industrial firms formed partnerships with nations such as the Soviet Union and Argentina to produce weapons and sell them legally. After the death of Yuan Shikai, the Republic of China had descended into a civil war between various warlords. German arms producers began looking to re-establish commercial links with China to tap into its vast market for weapons and military assistance.

The Weimar Republic's Foreign Office favoured a policy of friendship with the Republic of China. In 1921, Germany became the first major European power to sign an equal treaty with China, ending its previous unequal treaty rights. In 1924, the Kuomintang (Nationalists or KMT) party was founded by Sun Yat-sen in Guangzhou. With the support of the Soviet Union and the Chinese Communists, the KMT planned to launch a Northern Expedition to defeat the warlords and unify the Republic. The Nationalists also sought German assistance, and turned to the German-educated Zhu Jiahua. Zhu would go on to arrange almost all of the Sino-German contacts from 1926 to 1944. In 1926, he invited Max Bauer to survey investment possibilities in China, and the next year, Bauer arrived in Guangzhou and was offered a post as Chiang Kai-shek's advisor. Soon, he managed to recruit 46 other German officers to advise and train the National Revolutionary Army while he helped devise a strategy for the Northern Expedition.

In 1928, Bauer returned to Germany to recruit a permanent advisory mission for China's industrialization efforts. However, Bauer was not entirely successful, as many firms hesitated because of China's political instability and because Bauer was a persona non grata for his participation in the 1920 Kapp Putsch. In addition, Germany was still constrained by the Treaty of Versailles, which made direct military investment impossible. The Weimar Foreign Ministry urged neutrality and discouraged the Reichswehr from becoming directly involved with the Chinese government. The same feeling was shared by the German import-export houses for fear that direct government ties would exclude them from profiting as the middleman. After he returned to China, Bauer contracted smallpox, died, and was buried in Shanghai. Sino-German trade slowed between 1930 and 1932 because of the Great Depression.

In 1929, Colonel Hermann Kriebel, a Nazi fanatic, became Bauer's deputy. He was a member of the paramilitary Freikorps and had a long history of putschism alongside Hitler in Bavaria. Kriebel was arrogant, contemptuous of the Chinese, and quarreled with Bauer's hand-picked officers. His attitude almost doomed the mission, and Chiang demanded his removal.

In the late 1920s and early 1930s, German arms dealer Hans Klein (often rendered “Klein” / 克蘭) became intimately involved in the Sino-German arms-industrial relationship. Klein had emerged in the 1920s as a prominent arms trader during the period when Hans von Seeckt led Germany's post-Versailles secret rearmament efforts, including support for the so-called “Schwarze Reichswehr” (Black Reichswehr). When Germany's strategic investments in the Soviet Union diminished, Klein turned his attention to China's emerging arms market. In autumn 1930, under the patronage of Guangdong warlord Chen Jitang, Klein was introduced to Guangdong authorities via German intermediary Andreas Mayer-Mader, at Seeckt's recommendation. Klein subsequently negotiated contracts for munitions-factory construction in Guangdong, advancing Germany's entry into the Chinese arms-industry sector.

== Nazi Germany and China ==
China–Nazi Germany relations
- China: Germany

=== Economic and military cooperation ===
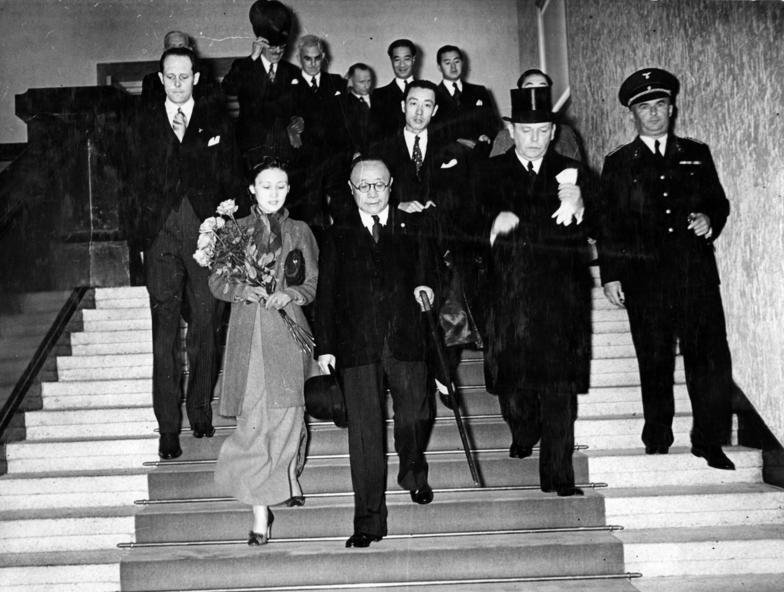
Chinese ambassador Chen Jie in Berlin in 1938

In 1933, the Nazi Party came to power in Germany. The Nazis sought to increase cooperation with the Nationalists in order to gain access to Chinese raw materials. Foreign Minister Konstantin von Neurath very much believed in maintaining Germany's good relations with China and mistrusted the Empire of Japan. The 1931 Japanese invasion of Manchuria had shown the Chinese leadership the need for military and industrial modernization and they wanted German investment. Moreover, the rapid rise of Nazi Germany's military strength led some Chinese elites to explore fascist ideas. In the 1930s, the Nationalist government sought to adopt some aspects of Nazi Germany mode of governance.

In October 1933, Hans von Seeckt arrived in China to head the German military mission. At the time of his arrival, Sino-German relations were in a bad state owing to the racial arrogance of the Germans, and Chiang Kai-shek was considering firing the Germans and bringing in a French military mission. In order to save the military mission, Seeckt ordered the German officers to behave with more tact towards the Chinese and to start showing some respect for Chinese sensibilities. In this way, Seeckt saved Germany's position in China. In May 1933, Seeckt arrived in Shanghai to oversee German economic and military involvement in China. He submitted the Denkschrift für Marschall Chiang Kai-shek memorandum outlining his programme for industrialising and militarising China. He called for a small, mobile, and well-equipped force to replace the massive but under-trained army. In addition, he advocated for the army to be the "foundation of ruling power" and for military power to rest in qualitative superiority derived from qualified officers. Von Seeckt suggested that the first step toward achieving this framework was the uniform training and consolidation of the Chinese military under Chiang's command and that the entire military system must be subordinated into a centralised hierarchy. Toward that goal, von Seeckt proposed the formation of a "training brigade" to replace the German eliteheer, which would train other units, with its officer corps selected from strict military placements.

Since 1932, the Chinese Ministry of Transportation and Communications further advanced pro-German initiatives by purchasing aircraft from Germany and sending Chinese technicians for training there. Coordination with the German side was largely conducted through Minister Zhu Jiahua, who invited General Hans von Seeckt to visit China and personally served as interpreter during Seeckt's meetings with Chiang Kai-shek. In the mid-1930s, a number of Sino-German cultural exchange institutions, such as the Chinese Academic Friendship Association (中國學院聯誼會) and the Sino-German Cultural and Economic Association, were established under Zhu's direction to strengthen bilateral academic and industrial cooperation.

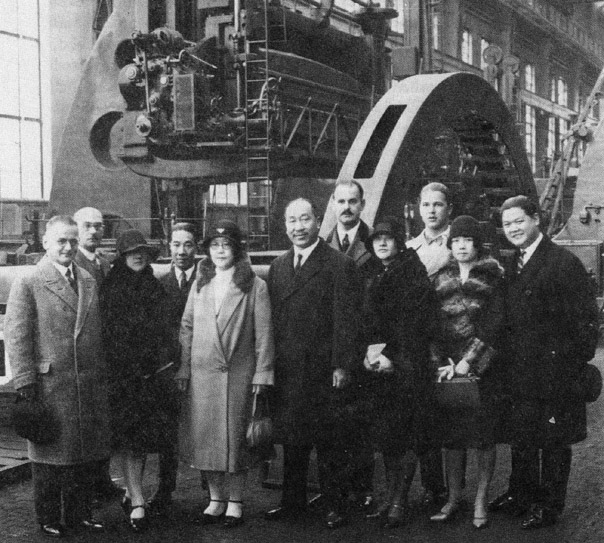
Chinese Minister Chiang Tso-pin and entourage visiting a German factory, 1928

In January 1934, the Handelsgesellschaft für industrielle Produkte, or Hapro, was created to unify all German industrial interests in China. The most important industrial project from the Sino-German cooperation was the 1936 Three-Year Plan, which was administered by the Chinese government's National Resources Commission and the Hapro corporation. It had several basic components, such as the monopolisation of all operations of tungsten and antimony, the construction of the central steel and machine works in Hubei, Hunan, and Sichuan, and the development of power plants and chemical factories. Cost overruns for the projects were partly offset by the fact that the price of tungsten had more than doubled between 1932 and 1936. Germany also extended a 100-million Reichsmark line of credit to the Kuomintang. The Three-Year Plan introduced a class of technocrats to run the state-owned projects.

The Chinese military was an important customer for German arms manufacturers and heavy industry. Chinese exports to Germany, including deliveries of tin and tungsten, were also seen as vital. At its height, Germany accounted for 17% of China's foreign trade and China was the largest trade partner for German businesses in Asia.

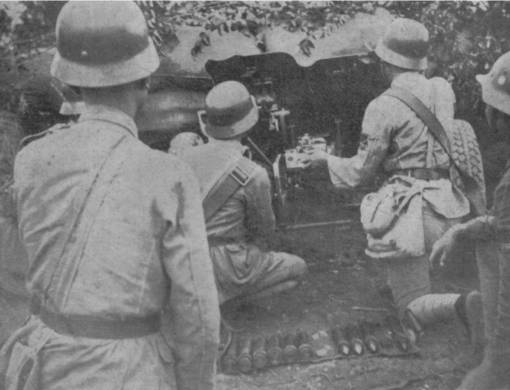
Stahlhelm-wearing Chinese soldiers firing a Pak 36 anti-tank gun

Germany sent military advisers such as Alexander von Falkenhausen to China to help the KMT government reform its armed forces. Von Seeckt's original plans called for a drastic reduction of the military to 60 elite divisions, which would be modeled on the Wehrmacht, but the factions that would be axed remained an open question. As a whole, the officer corps trained by the Whampoa Academy until 1927 had been only marginally better in quality than the warlord armies, but remained loyal to Chiang. Von Falkenhausen believed that it was too optimistic to expect the National Revolutionary Army (NRA) to be supported by armor and heavy artillery because the industry lacked the necessary capacity. Thus, he emphasized the creation of a mobile force that relied on small arms and would be adept with infiltration tactics, like those of the German stormtroopers around the end of World War I.

Some divisions began training to German standards and were to form a relatively small but-well trained Chinese Central Army. By the mid-1930s, about 80,000 soldiers had received German-style training. A few pilots of the Nationalist air force did aerial-combat training with the Luftwaffe. The Nazis also provided military hardware. According to von Seeckt, around 80% of China's output of weapons were below par or unsuitable for modern warfare. Therefore, projects were undertaken to modernise existing arsenals. For example, the Hanyang Arsenal was reconstructed in 1935 and 1936 to produce Maxim machine guns, various 82 mm trench mortars, and the Chiang Kai-shek rifle (based on the German Mauser Standardmodell and Karabiner 98k rifles). The Chiang Kai-shek and Hanyang 88 rifles remained as the predominant firearms used by Chinese armies throughout the war.

=== Debate over China policy in the Nazi Foreign Office ===
As the 1930s progressed, the Nazi government began leaning noticeably closer to Japan while the advisors (and many members of the German army) continued to push for a stronger Sino-German relationship. Although Neurath and the German Foreign Office continued to favor a pro-China foreign policy, "Ambassador-Plenipotentiary at Large" Joachim von Ribbentrop—who was in charge of an unofficial, alternative foreign ministry sponsored by Hitler—strongly preferred an alliance with Japan. For their part, the Japanese political and military establishments were, by 1934, less than certain about the usefulness of the new Hitler government in Germany, which Tokyo assumed would attempt to maintain a peaceful relationship with the Soviet Union and avoid any open alignment with Moscow's enemies. The distrust that Japan felt was partially caused by the close relationship between Germany and China, which, in turn, was perceived as an ally of the Soviet Union against Japan. So Japanese Ambassador Kintomo Mushanokōji and military attaché Hiroshi Ōshima often worked closely with Ribbentrop to undermine German-Chinese economic and diplomatic relations.

One of the major questions was whether Germany would recognize the Japanese puppet state in Manchukuo, installed after the 1931 Japanese invasion of Manchuria. A recognition of Manchukuo, as suggested by German ambassador in Tokyo Herbert von Dirksen beginning in early 1934, would have clearly signaled support for Japanese expansionism. But fearing that the Chinese and Soviets would perceive such a move as an attempted encirclement, recognition of Manchukuo was initially opposed by Neurath and the Foreign Office. In response to his initial request to recognize Manchukuo, Ambassador Dirksen was instructed to avoid "any close relations with Japan which might lay [Germany] open to being suspected of wishing to render assistance against Russia". This level of caution was also attributable to the Germans' impression that war between Japan and the USSR could be on the horizon. They assumed that the Soviet Union would receive the aid of the western democracies if it were to break out, and the German Foreign Office sought, at all costs, to avoid entanglement in such a conflict.

=== Anti-Comintern Pact ===
In mid-1935, Germany attempted to draw China into the Anti-Comintern Pact. Ribbentrop and Ōshima came up with the idea of an anti-communist alliance that could somehow resolve the conflict between China and Japan, which was hindering Germany from realizing its plans and activities in Asia. Wang Jingwei was in favor of joining the pact, but Chiang Kai-shek was careful not to offend the Soviet Union, which was China's only potential partner in case of a Japanese attack. Chiang knew that the Japanese regarded Chinese adhesion to the proposed pact as a way of subordinating China to Japan. Moreover, the Chinese side was opposed to ideological blocs that would divide the political scene into two large warring camps. As the Chinese hesitated, Foreign Minister Neurath and War Minister Werner von Blomberg persuaded Hitler to shelve the proposed treaty to avoid damaging Germany's good relations with China. But Ribbentrop disagreed and argued that Germany and Japan should sign the pact regardless. The revival of Berlin-Tokyo relations had a significant impact on Germany's position, as did the fact that Japan, long before China, had collaborated with Germany, which, as the Prussian Empire, had played a significant role in shaping Japan during the Meiji period. Therefore, Germany treated China instrumentally, acting solely to obtain necessary raw materials, rather than as an equal partner. Politically, however, it was much closer to Japan, and recognition of Manchukuo by Germany and dispassionate withdrawal from China clearly confirmed the German position.

One of the prominent figures who discerned the cynical game being played by the Germans was Zhang Fakui, a Chinese Nationalist general. Among all Chinese officials, he was the most skeptical toward the Germans. His aversion manifested as a profound lack of trust: he neither accepted their advice nor shared any secrets with them. He consistently rejected German tactical guidelines, relying instead on his own experience gained during the Civil War and the Northern Expedition. German advisors frequently complained that they only learned of Zhang’s plans once his divisions were already en route to the battlefield. He excluded the Germans from staff meetings concerning key troop movements and emphasized to his subordinates that the Germans had no right to lecture China or interfere in its internal affairs. Years later, in an interview with a journalist, he candidly admitted: "I always had a poor opinion of the Germans." In hindsight, Zhang Fakui’s distrust proved to be entirely justified. When, in 1938, Adolf Hitler decided that an alliance with an expansionist Japan would be more advantageous, it served as final proof for Zhang Fakui that the Germans were merely cynical mercenaries—whose loyalty China should never have counted on.

A revival of interest in both Tokyo and Berlin led to the signing of the Anti-Comintern Pact on 25 November 1936, without Chinese participation, although China did receive an invitation to join. After serious consideration, the Chiang administration refused. They were unwilling to align with Japan without a retreat of Japanese forces from China. Such a retreat was rejected by Japan, which meant that China was unwilling to offend the Soviet Union, the only major power that would be able to effectively aid them in the case of a war against Japan. The Anti-Comintern Pact marked the beginning of Germany's shift away from China and towards Japan.

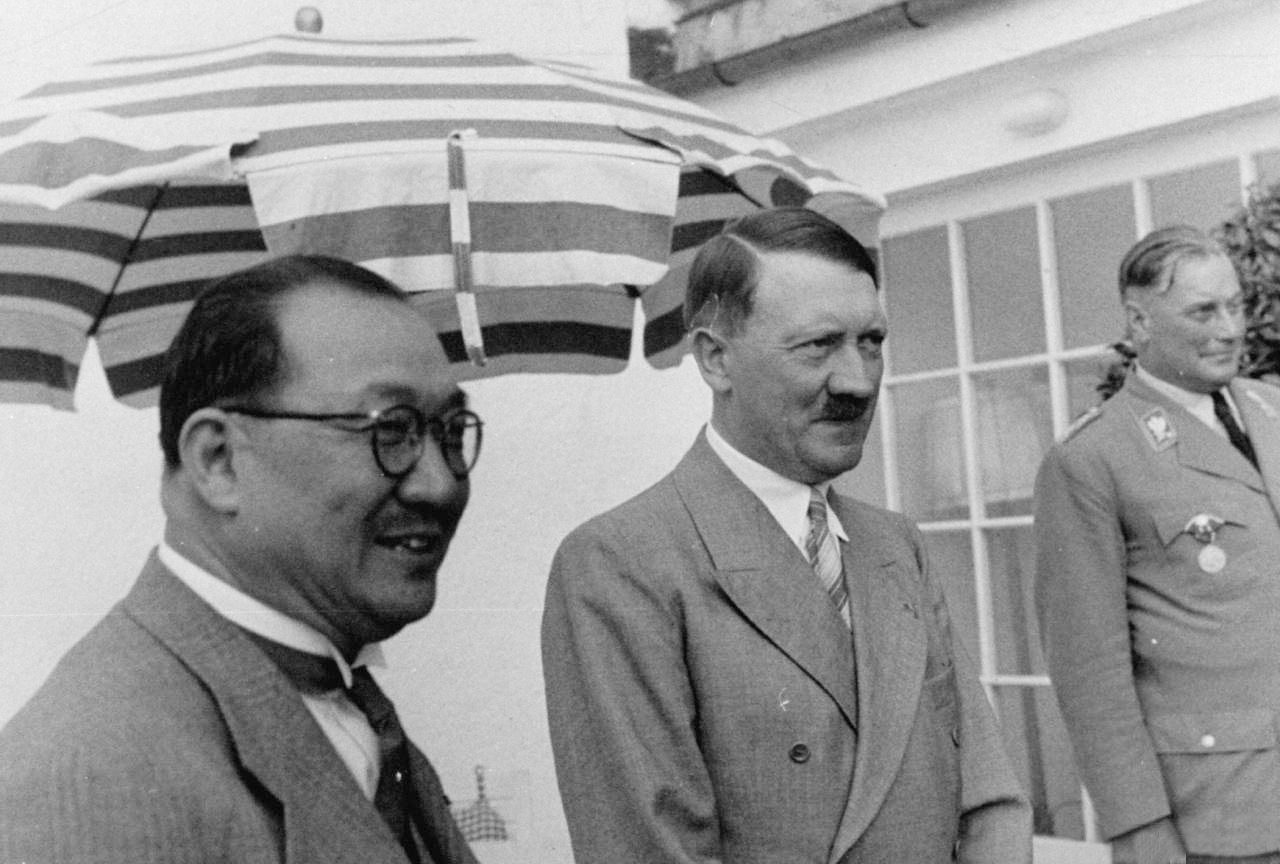
H. H. Kung and Adolf Hitler in Berlin

Chinese Finance Minister H.H. Kung and two other KMT officials visited Germany in June 1937 in an attempt to persuade the Germans to reverse their realignment towards Japan. During a meeting with Hans Georg von Mackensen, Kung argued that Japan was not a reliable ally for Germany, citing as an example the Japanese invasion of Qingdao and the former German colonies in the Pacific Islands during World War I. He claimed that China was a true anti-Communist state but that Japan was only "flaunting." Von Mackensen promised that there would be no problems in Sino-German relations as long as he and Konstantin von Neurath were in charge of the Foreign Ministry. Kung also met Hjalmar Schacht, who explained to him that the Anti-Comintern Pact was not a German-Japanese alliance against China. Germany was glad to lend China 100 million Reichsmark (equivalent 2021 to €449 million) and would not do so with the Japanese.

Kung visited Hermann Göring on June 11, who told him he thought that Japan was a "Far East Italy," in reference to the fact that during World War I, Italy had broken its alliance and declared war against Germany, and Germany would never trust Japan. Göring, however, viewed the Japanese as the stronger and most valuable power in Asia, especially given their contempt for the Soviets, and pushed for an Anti-Comintern Pact between Germany and Japan. Kung met Hitler on June 13, who assured him that Germany had no political or territorial demands in the Far East, and that Germany's only interest in China was business. Hitler also expressed the hope that China and Japan could co-operate and offered to mediate any disputes, as he had done between Italy and Yugoslavia. Hitler also mentioned that he admired Chiang Kai-shek for building a powerful central government.

=== End of diplomatic relations ===
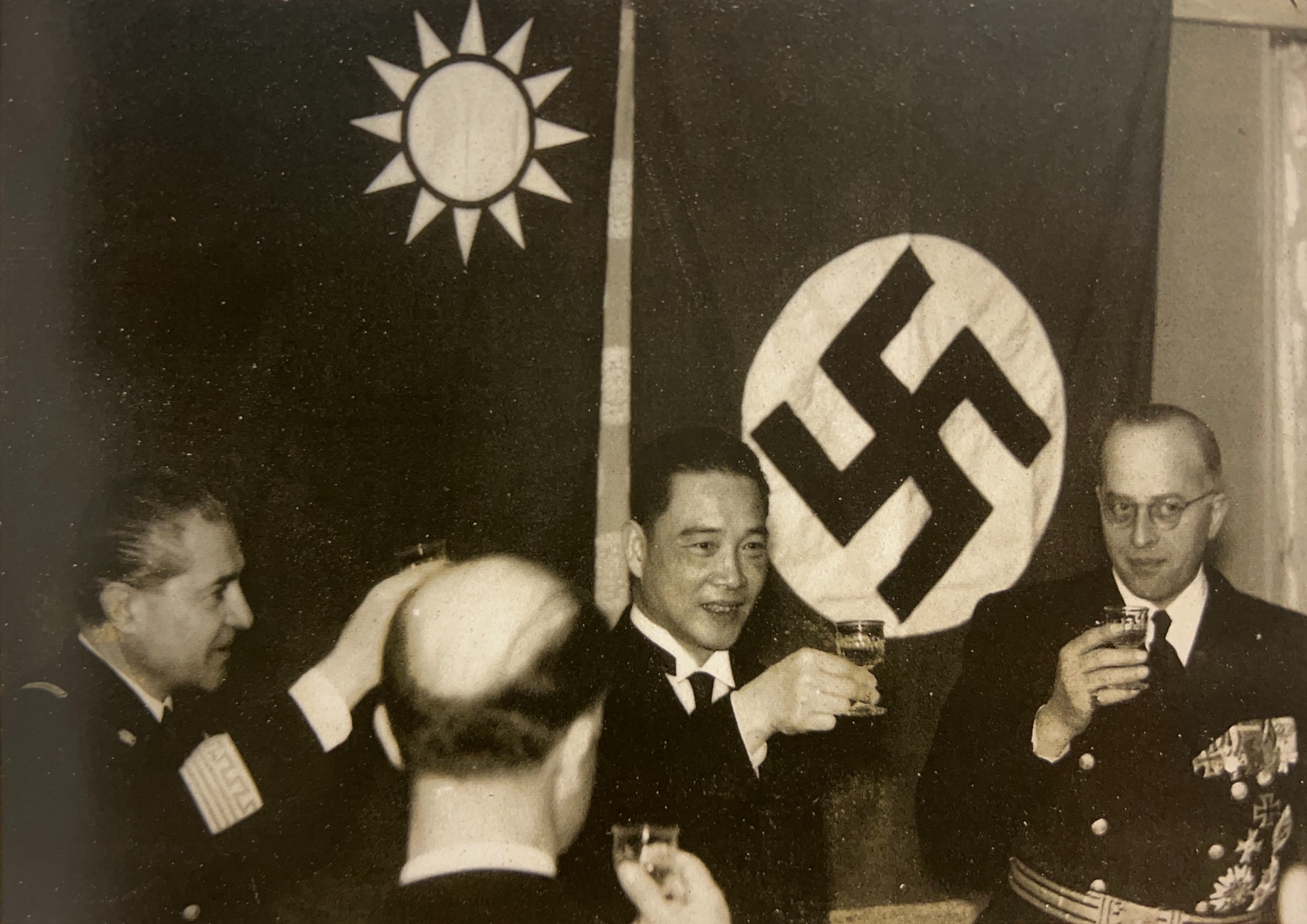
Wang Jingwei of the Japanese-puppet government in Nanjing, meeting with Nazi diplomats in 1941

Despite German reassurances, the outbreak of the Second Sino-Japanese War the following month caused a major rupture in relations. After the KMT lost Nanjing and retreated to Wuhan, Hitler's government decided to withdraw its support of China and turn decisively towards Japan. Joachim von Ribbentrop succeeded Neurath as Foreign Minister on 4 February 1938, and one of his first acts was to finalize the volte-face in Germany's Far Eastern policies. Ribbentrop was instrumental, in February 1938, in persuading Hitler to recognize the Japanese puppet state of Manchukuo and to renounce German claims upon its former colonies in the Pacific, which were now held by Japan.

By April 1938, Ribbentrop had ended all German arms shipments to China and had all of the German Army officers serving with the Nationalist government recalled, with the threat that the families of the officers in China would be sent to concentration camps if the officers did not return to Germany immediately. At the same time, the end of Chinese economic relations Germany meant the end of the exchange of Chinese natural resources for German weapons and military advisers, which prompted Chiang Kai-shek to terminate all concessions and contracts held by German companies in Kuomintang China. Germany continued to side with Japan, and in 1940 signed the Tripartite Pact with Japan and Italy. In July 1941, Germany officially recognised Wang Jingwei's puppet government in Nanjing after negotiations by its Foreign Minister Chu Minyi. After the attack on Pearl Harbor in 1941, China declared war on Germany, and in 1942 signed the Declaration by United Nations, becoming an official member of the anti-Nazi bloc.

In 1939, the day after the German attack on Poland, Chiang Kai-shek called a meeting at which he advocated for a declaration of war against Germany. The largest faction in all of China, with views similar to Chiang's, supported his views and believed that cooperation with Great Britain and France was the right path. The smallest faction, but influential, represented by Zhu Jiahua, Wang Chonghui, H. H. Kung, and Zhang Qun argued that China should maintain caution and a neutral stance towards the conflict in Europe and wait for further developments. However, they also ultimately accepted Chiang's plans on the condition that Great Britain would supply China with weapons and other means to fight Japan. On September 12, Chiang Kai-shek sent a telegram to Guo Taiqi, the Chinese ambassador to Great Britain, and Gu Weijun, the ambassador to France, instructing them to convey the message that "from now on, China, together with Great Britain, France and Poland will fight in Asia and Europe, resisting aggression and showing true friendship and solidarity." Chiang Kai-shek also clarified his position on the European war: "In general, our country stands in solidarity with the Poland that has been attacked and supports its stance in the League of Nations".

In 1940, Zhu Jiahua sent a message to German Field Marshal Wilhelm Keitel, expressing hope that Germany would use its influence to restore peace in Europe. The communication emphasized that Japan could not prevail in East Asia and that German long-term interests would be better utilized in China's post-war reconstruction. In retaliation, the Gestapo launched mass arrests and full-scale persecution of Chinese Germans. A total of 130 Chinese were arrested, mostly in St. Pauli, on charges of "supporting the enemy," as the Republic of China formally joined the Allies on December 9, 1941, and also declared war on Germany. The men were taken to the Fuhlsbüttel "police prison," which the Gestapo was then using as a concentration camp and detention center. As part of the "China Action", Gestapo officers robbed numerous Chinese of their belongings and ransacked their homes and pubs. At least 17 of the arrested men died as a result of ill-treatment and forced labor in Fuhlsbüttel and Wilhelmsburg. The exact number of victims is difficult to determine, as few documents have survived. The Chinese men imprisoned there on May 13, 1944, were beaten and tortured for months. Several victims testified after the war that Hanisch was particularly notorious for his cruelty. In September, a group of 60 to 80 men were transferred to a "labor re-education camp" in Wilhelmsburg, where they were forced to work in the surrounding industrial areas. They repaired a damaged railway line and worked at the Rhenania Ossag (now Shell) oil refinery, often beaten by guards. Many suffered from starvation. During the "China Action," the Gestapo also targeted German women who lived in partnerships with Chinese men. Many of them had already been repeatedly defamed by the German population in previous years, labeled as indecent women and prostitutes. In line with Nazi racial policy, in 1944, they were accused of "endangering the German nation" through their relationships with Chinese men. Although Hitler considered the Chinese to be one of the weakest races in the world and completely unsuitable for life in Germany, the foreign citizenship and socioeconomic status of Chinese citizens sometimes protected them from racial persecution.

== See also ==
- China–Germany relations
- Foreign relations of the Axis powers
- History of foreign relations of China
- Persecution of Chinese people in Nazi Germany
