= 19th Route Army =

Left-wing, non-Communist Chinese army during the conflict with Japan

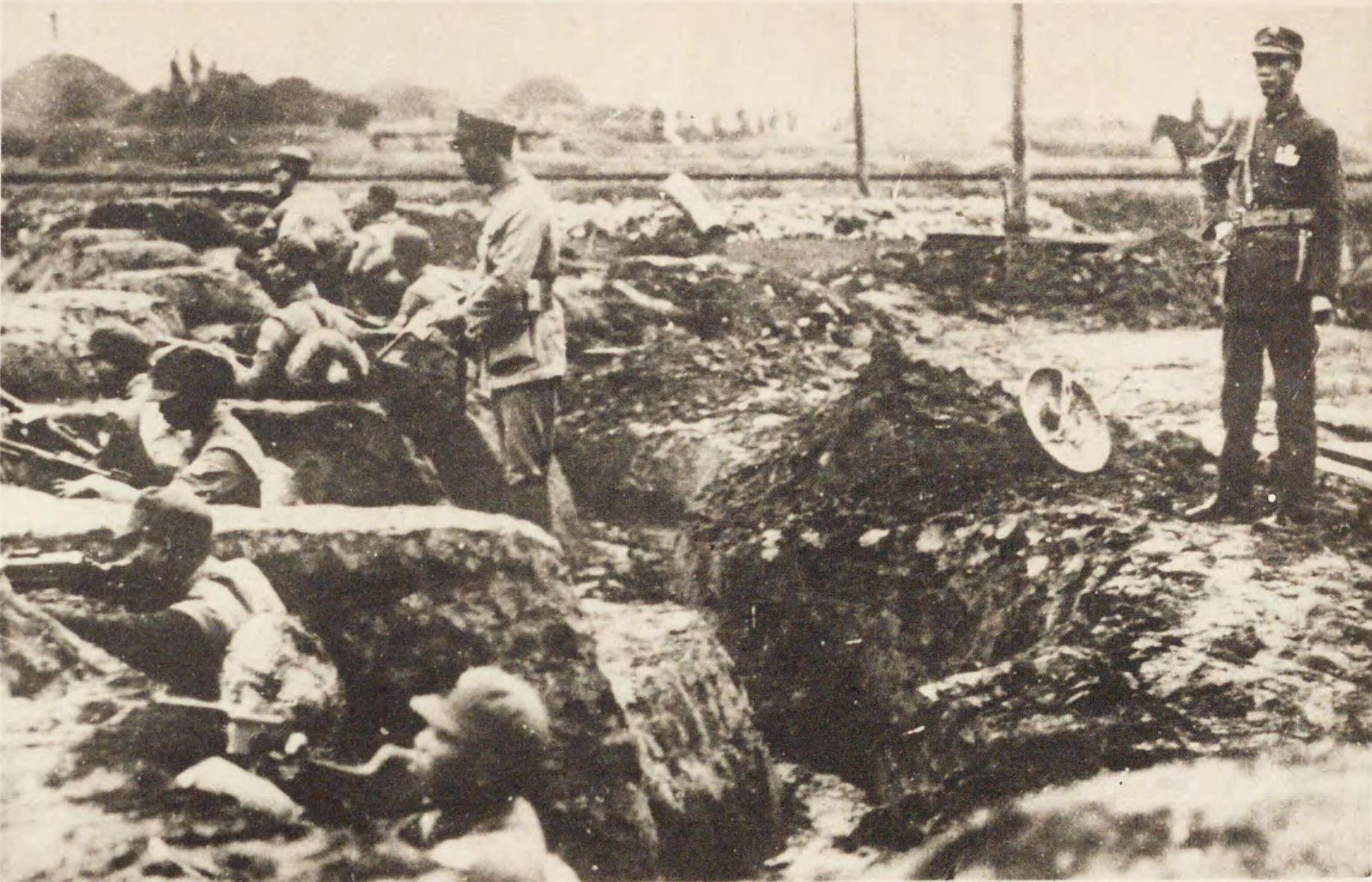
Cai Tingkai as commander of the 19th Route Army

19th Route Army (simplified Chinese: 十九路军; traditional Chinese: 十九路軍; pinyin: Shíjiǔ lù jūn) was an army in the Republic of China led by General Cai Tingkai. It gained a good reputation among the Chinese for fighting the Japanese in Shanghai in the January 28 Incident in 1932. In 1933–34, it was the main force in the Fuijan Rebellion, which opposed Chiang Kai-shek and unsuccessfully sought an alliance with the Chinese communists in the Jiangxi Soviet.

A Route Army was a type of military organization used in the Chinese Republic. It usually exercised command over two or more Corps or a large number of Divisions or Independent Brigades.

== Sources ==
- First Battle of Shanghai
- The Mausoleum of the 19th Route Army
- Did Chiang Kai-shek Trigger the Fujian Rebellion?
- The CCP and the Fujian Rebellion

== See also ==
- Second Sino-Japanese War
- Fujian People's Government
