= Fujian People's Government =

Anti-Kuomintang government in China (1933–1934)

People's Revolutionary Government of the Republic of China 中華共和國人民革命政府 Zhōnghuá Gònghéguó Rénmín Gémìng Zhèngfǔ
- 1933–1934
- Flag

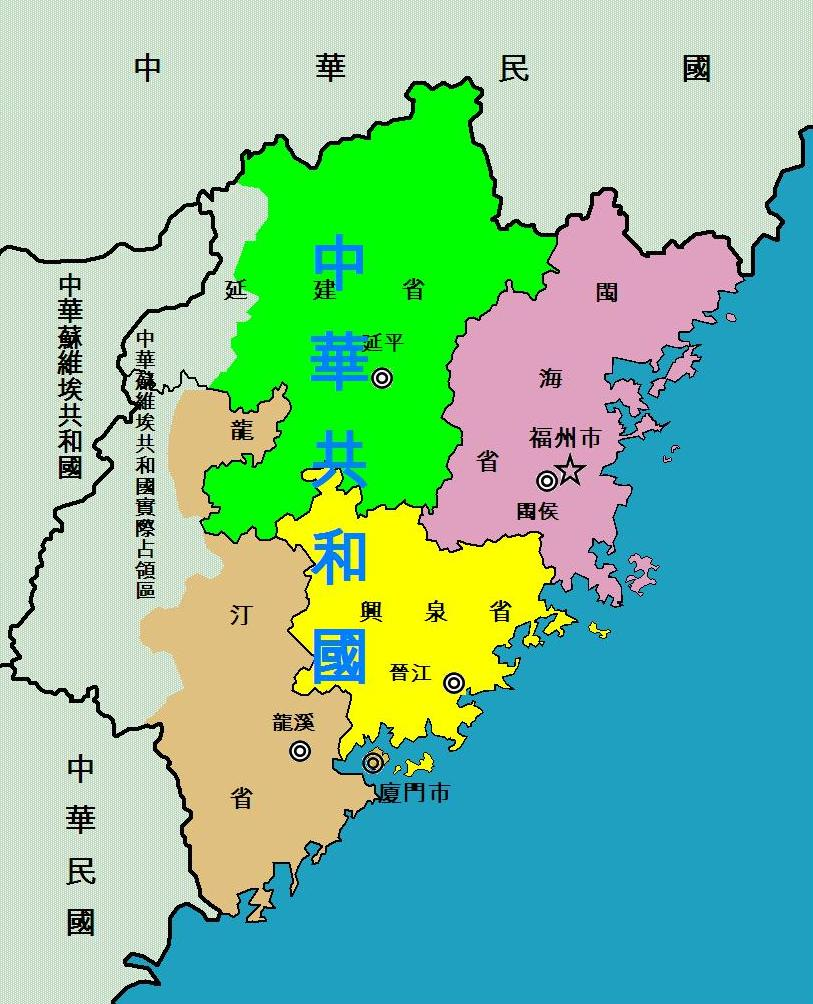
- The Fujian People's Republic in dark green Claims in green Broader China in light green The province of Fujian within the Republic of China, where the government was based
- Status: Historical unrecognised state
- Capital: Fuzhou; Zhangzhou
- Common languages: Chinese (Mandarin, Min, Gan, Wu, Hakka and Shanke)
- Government: Socialist republic
- Chairman of the People's Revolutionary Government Committee
  - 1933–1934: Li Jishen
- Chairman of the Presidium of the Chinese National People's Provisional Congress
  - 1933–1934: Huang Qixiang
- Chairman of the Military Commission
  - 1933–1934: Li Jishen
- Legislature: Congress of Peasants, Workers, Merchants, Students and Soldiers
- Historical era: Chinese Civil War
  - Formation: 22 November 1933
  - Surrender to the Kuomintang: 13 January 1934
- Date format: yyyy-mm-dd; yyyy年m月d日 (CE; CE+2697); 中華共和國yy年m月d日 (CE−1933)
Preceded by	Succeeded by
Republic of China (1912–1949)	Republic of China (1912–1949)
- Today part of: People's Republic of China ∟Fujian (mainland); Republic of China ∟Fuchien (Kinmen) ∟Fuchien (Matsu)

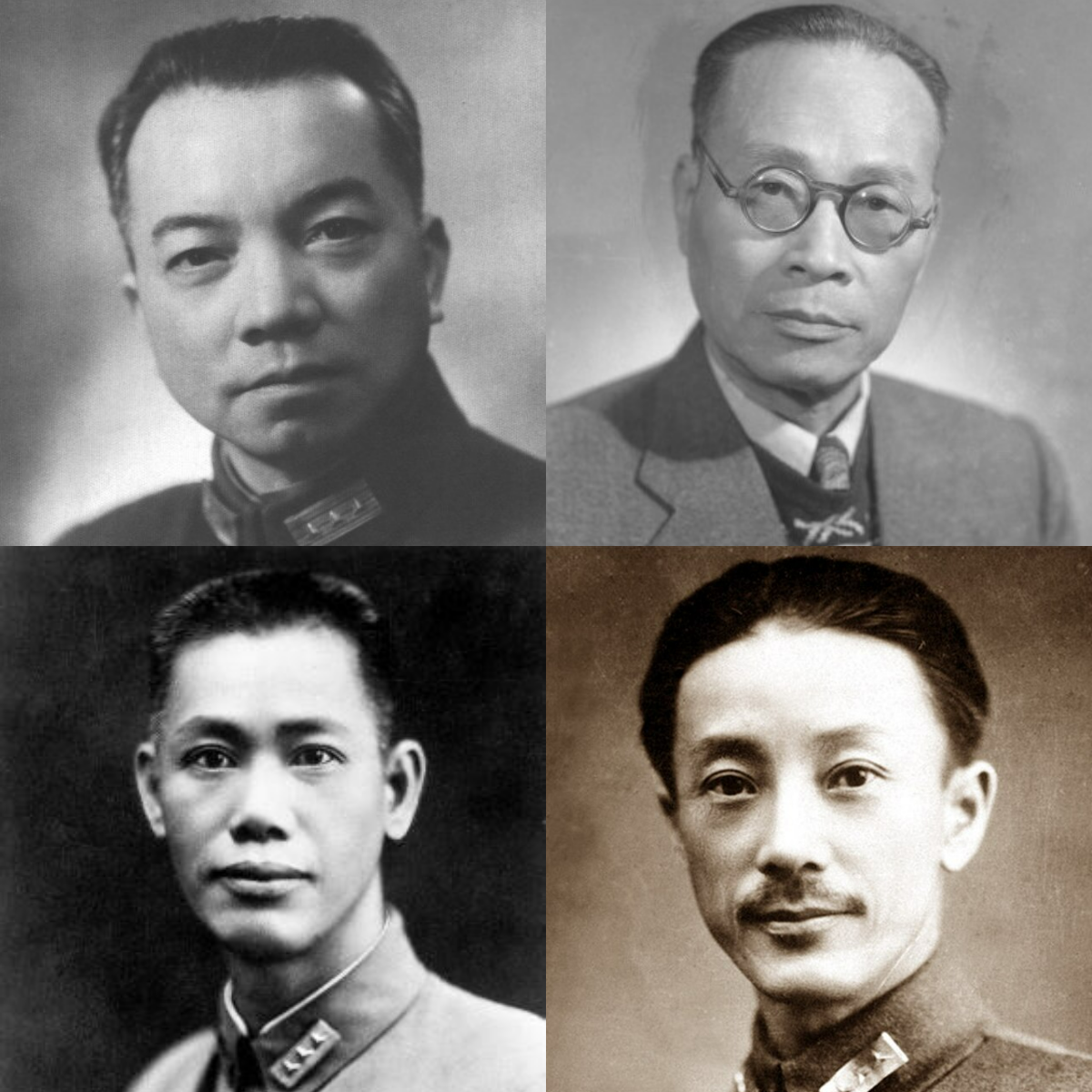
Main Leaders of the Fujian People's Government

The Fujian People's Government (also spelled as the Fukien People's Government, Chinese: 福建人民政府; pinyin: Fújiàn Rénmín Zhèngfǔ), officially the People's Revolutionary Government of the Republic of China (Note: Although the government bore the same English name as Chiang Kai-shek's Kuomintang regime in Nanjing, i.e. "Republic of China," the Chinese forms names were different: 中華共和國 (Zhōnghuá Gònghéguó, lit. 'Chinese Republic State') for the Fujian People's Government vs. 中華民國 (Zhōnghuá Mínguó, lit. 'Chinese People's State') in Nanjing.) (Chinese: 中華共和國人民革命政府; pinyin: Zhōnghuá Gònghéguó Rénmín Gémìng Zhèngfǔ), was a short-lived anti-Kuomintang government that established a socialist republic in the Republic of China's Fujian Province. It lasted between 22 November 1933 and 13 January 1934. The rebellion that led to its formation and its collapse are known as the Fujian Incident (閩變; Mǐnbiàn or 福建事變; Fújiàn Shìbiàn) or Fujian Rebellion.

== Background ==
In November 1933 some leaders of the National Revolutionary Army's 19th Route Army—including Cai Tingkai, Chen Mingshu and Jiang Guangnai, who had gained fame for their role in the January 28 Incident—were deployed to southern China to suppress a Communist rebellion. Instead, they negotiated peace with the rebels. In alliance with other Kuomintang forces under Li Jishen, the 19th Route leaders broke with Chiang Kai-shek and took control of Fujian, where they were stationed, and on 22 November 1933, proclaimed a new government. The chairman of the government was Li Jishen, Eugene Chen was foreign minister, Jiang Guangnai was finance minister and Cai Tingkai was military head and governor of Fujian Province.

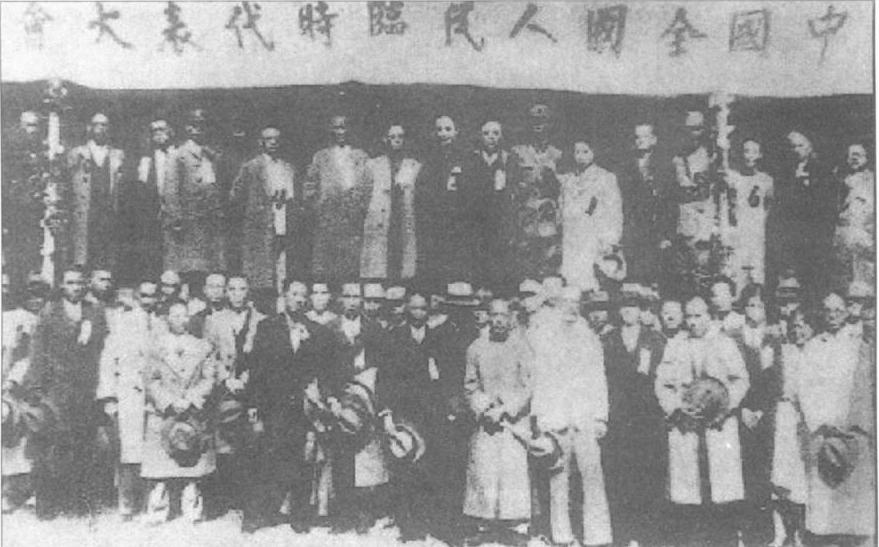
Deputies of the Chinese National People's Provisional Congress

The flag was red, symbolizing the proletariat, and blue, symbolizing the peasants, with a yellow star in the middle symbolizing the glorious unity of the productive people. The name of the new state was the "Republic of China" (Zhōnghuá Gònghéguó, 中華共和國, lit. 'Chinese Republic State', distinct from the Republic of China named Zhōnghuá Mínguó, 中華民國, lit. 'Chinese People's State'). The 19th Route Army was renamed the People's Revolutionary Army (人民革命軍).

Chen Mingshu led the newly created Productive People's Party, while it had support from the "Third Party". The Chinese Youth Party considered supporting them, but were put off by their leftism and lack of realistic sustainability. The rebellion initially enjoyed popular support among most Fujianese, but high taxes to support the army decreased its popularity. In addition, the new government's decision to break continuity by issuing a new flag, new symbols and occasionally removing the portrait of the revered leader Sun Yat-sen caused hesitation in many quarters. After adopting a wait-and-see approach, the New Guangxi clique declined to support the rebels. Feng Yuxiang was widely expected to be supportive, but he remained silent. Chen Jitang and Hu Hanmin were sympathetic to their goals, but condemned them for dividing the country. The fear of a new civil war at a time of Japanese aggression was the main reason why the rebellion had very little popularity.

The rebels were motivated by, among other things, personal disagreements with Chiang Kai-shek, opposition to perceived appeasement of Japan and their assignment to the then relatively poor Fujian. The goals of the new government included the overthrow of the Kuomintang government in Nanjing, various social and political reforms and stronger resistance to foreign interference in China. The rebellion brought a temporary halt to the central government's Fifth Encirclement Campaign in southeast China. However, implied or promised aid to the rebellion from the Communist Party's Jiangxi Soviet failed to materialize due to opposition by the 28 Bolsheviks and the effort began to collapse.

The Kuomintang responded to the rebellion first with air attacks and, in January 1934, a ground offensive that quickly led to the defeat of the formerly prestigious 19th Route Army. On 13 January 1934, the government was defeated and its leaders fled or defected to Chiang Kai-shek's forces.
