= January 28 incident =

1932 China–Japan conflict in Shanghai

- Part of the interwar period
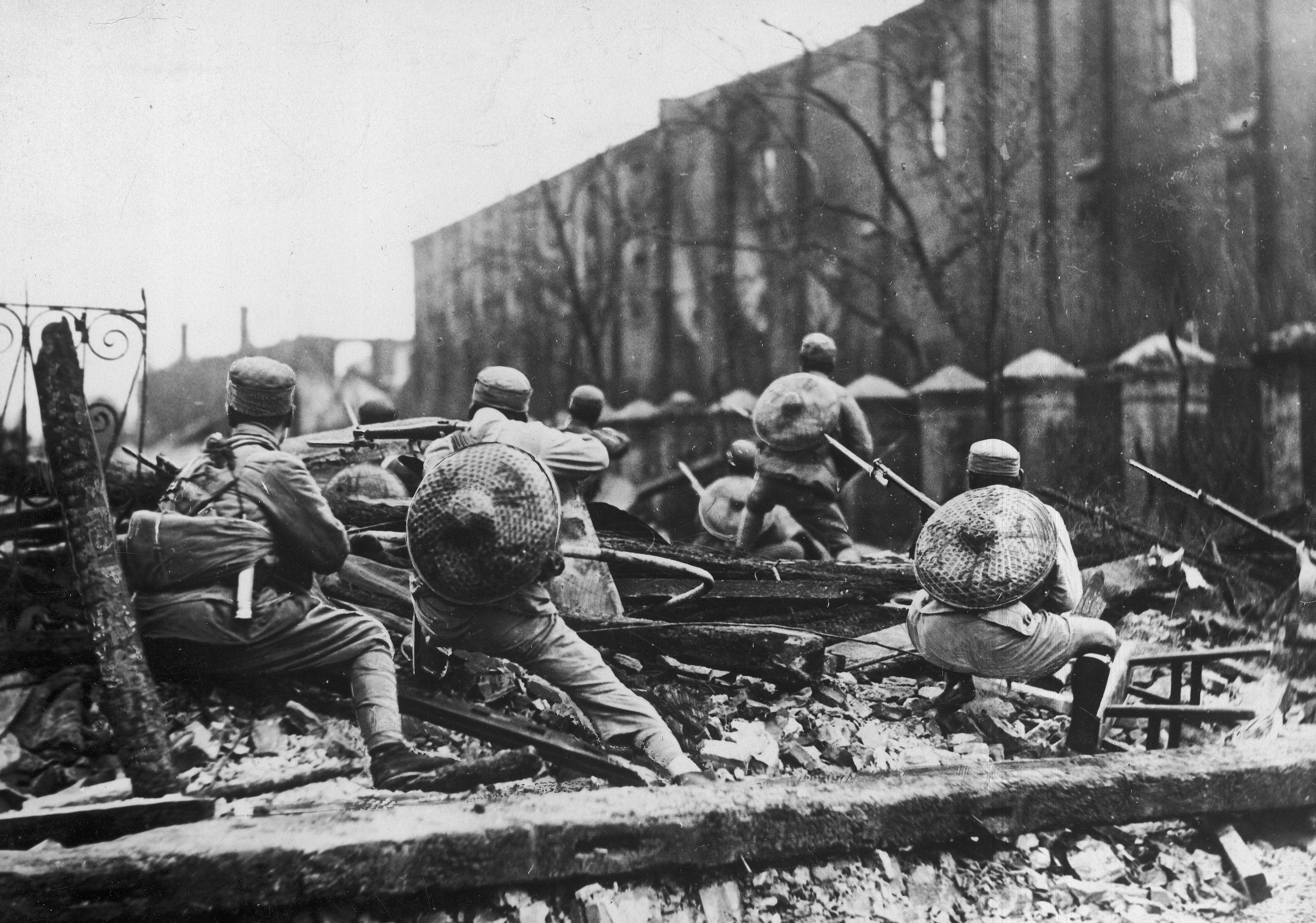
- The Chinese 19th Route Army in a defensive position
Date	January 28 – March 3, 1932 (1 month and 4 days)
Location	In and around Shanghai city in the Republic of China
Result	Ceasefire; Shanghai demilitarized

Belligerents
China	Japan

Commanders and leaders
19th Route Army: Jiang Guangnai; Cai Tingkai; 5th Army: Zhang Zhizhong	Commander: Yoshinori Shirakawa; Chief of staff: Kanichiro Tashiro

Units involved
(Republic of China (1912–1949)) 19th Route Army (Republic of China (1912–1949)) 5th Army	(Empire of Japan) Shanghai Expeditionary Army; Imperial Japanese Navy

Strength
50,000	30,000; 80 ships 300 aeroplanes

Casualties and losses
Western Claim: 4,000 KIA; 10,000 civilians killed Chinese Claim: 216 officers and 3,999 soldiers killed 677 officers and 9,153 soldiers wounded 26 officers and 730 soldiers missing Total: 14,801 killed, wounded, or missing (including 919 officers and 13,882 soldiers)	Western Estimate: 3,000 KIA Japanese Claim: 738 killed 2,257 wounded

The January 28 incident or Shanghai incident (January 28 – March 3, 1932) was a conflict between the Republic of China and the Empire of Japan. In apparent response to a mob attack on Japanese Buddhist monks, the Japanese in Shanghai rioted and burned down a factory, killing two Chinese. Heavy fighting broke out, and China appealed to the League of Nations. A truce was finally reached on May 5, calling for Chinese military withdrawal, and an end to Chinese boycotts of Japanese products. It is seen as the first example of a modern war waged in a large city between two heavily equipped armies and as a preview of what was to come during the Second World War.

The episode helped undermine civilian rule in Tokyo; Prime Minister Inukai Tsuyoshi was assassinated on May 15, 1932.

== Naming ==
In Chinese literature it is known as the January 28 incident (simplified Chinese: 一·二八事变; traditional Chinese: 一·二八事變; pinyin: Yī Èrbā Shìbiàn), while in Western sources it is often called the Shanghai War of 1932 or the Shanghai incident. In Japan it is known as the First Shanghai Incident (Japanese: 第一次上海事変), alluding to the Second Shanghai Incident, which is the Japanese name for the Battle of Shanghai that occurred during the opening stages of the Second Sino-Japanese War in 1937.

== Background ==
After the Mukden Incident, Japan had acquired control over Manchuria and would eventually establish the puppet government of Manchukuo, which had caused massive anti-Japanese demonstrations and boycotts across China, especially in major cities such as Shanghai and Guangzhou.

However, Major Tanaka Ryukichi of the Kwantung Army conspired to further turn the combustibles in Shanghai, where many Japanese businesses, residents and international observers were present, into diversion of major proportions, as escalation into a military intervention by the Japanese navy in the international city would divert global attention from his colleagues' military actions in north Manchuria.

On January 9, the Min-kuo Jih-pao, a semi-official KMT newspaper, described a failed assassination attempt on Emperor Hirohito in an editorial as "unfortunate". This provoked outrage among the Japanese, who perceived it as an affront to their national honor.

On January 18, five Japanese Nichiren Buddhist monks chanting the daimoku on an alms round were beaten near Shanghai's Sanyou Factory (simplified Chinese: 三友实业社; traditional Chinese: 三友實業社; pinyin: Sānyǒu Shíyèshè) by agitated Chinese civilians. Two were seriously injured, and one died. Over the next few hours, a Japanese group burnt down the factory, killing two Chinese in the fire. Later, during International Military Tribunal for the Far East and in his postwar memoirs, Tanaka Ryukichi claimed that he had paid the Chinese mob to beat the Buddhist monks.

One policeman was killed and several more hurt when they arrived to quell the disorder. This caused an upsurge of anti-Japanese and anti-imperialist protests in the city and its concessions, with Chinese residents of Shanghai marching onto the streets and calling for a boycott of Japanese-made goods.

Starting from January 22, Admiral Shiozawa of the Japanese Navy and Consul General Murai demanded that Shanghai Mayor Wu disband anti-Japanese societies and boycott activities. Representatives of Japanese conglomerates also lodged complaints with the Municipal Council of the Shanghai International Settlement, requesting that China apologize for the insulting report and attacks of the monks and punish the attackers. As tension further escalated, the Japanese Residents Association urged the Japanese naval forces in Shanghai to take actions to ensure their safety.

On the other hand, as threats and rumors of the Japanese naval landing forces' action echoed in Shanghai, the nearby 19th R.A. units moved closer to the Little Tokyo of the International Settlement. The Chinese public and critics of the Nanjing government were clamoring punishment for the forces of Manchurian warlord that failed to stop the Kwantung Army's blitzkrieg, which embolden the officers of the 19th R.A. to take a stance. Since the Nanjing government had not implemented any policies, General Cai Tingkai and his colleagues held an emergency meeting on January 23, vowing to resist any possible invasion of Shanghai by the Japanese navy at all costs.

== Battle ==
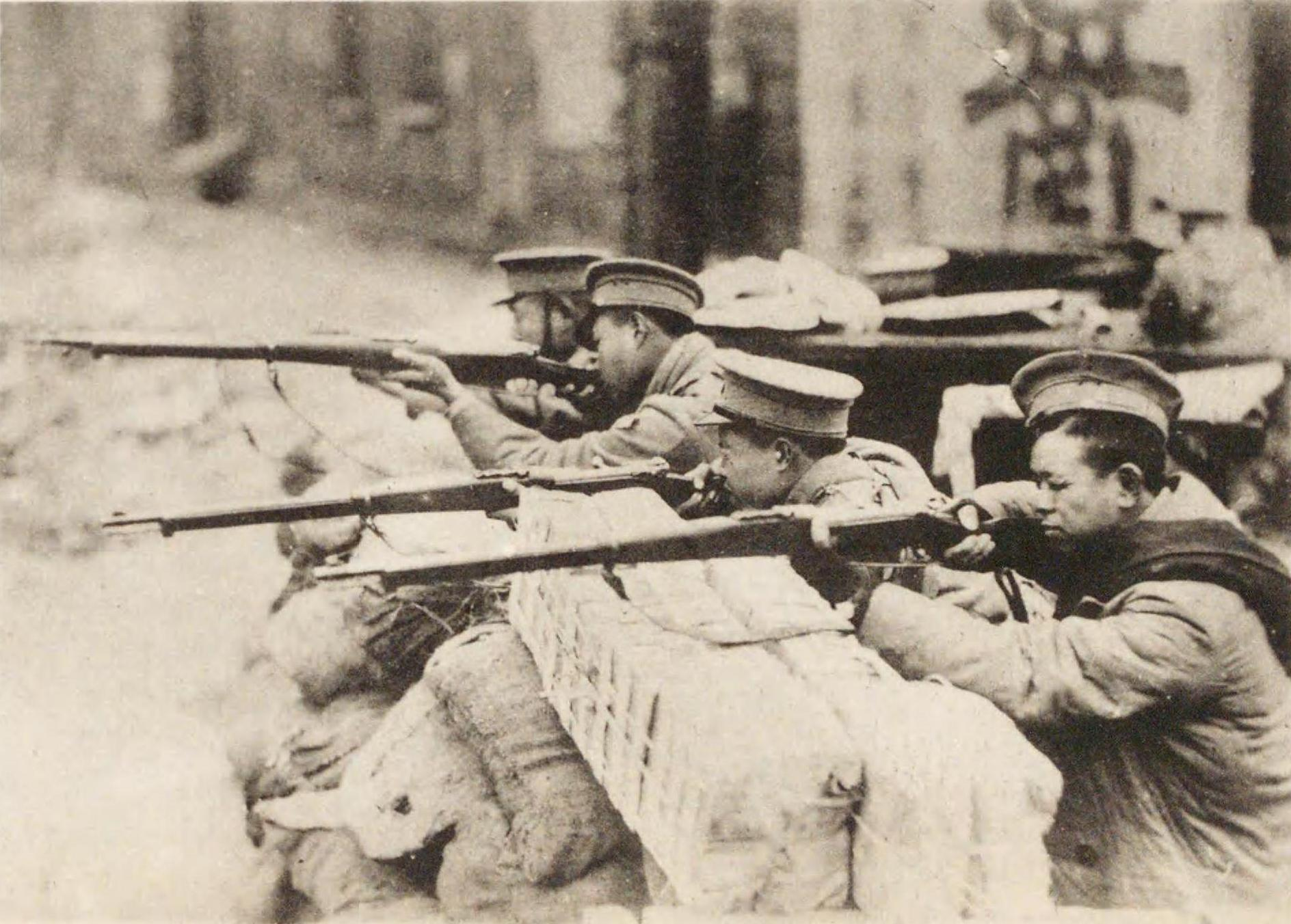
Chinese military police in combat

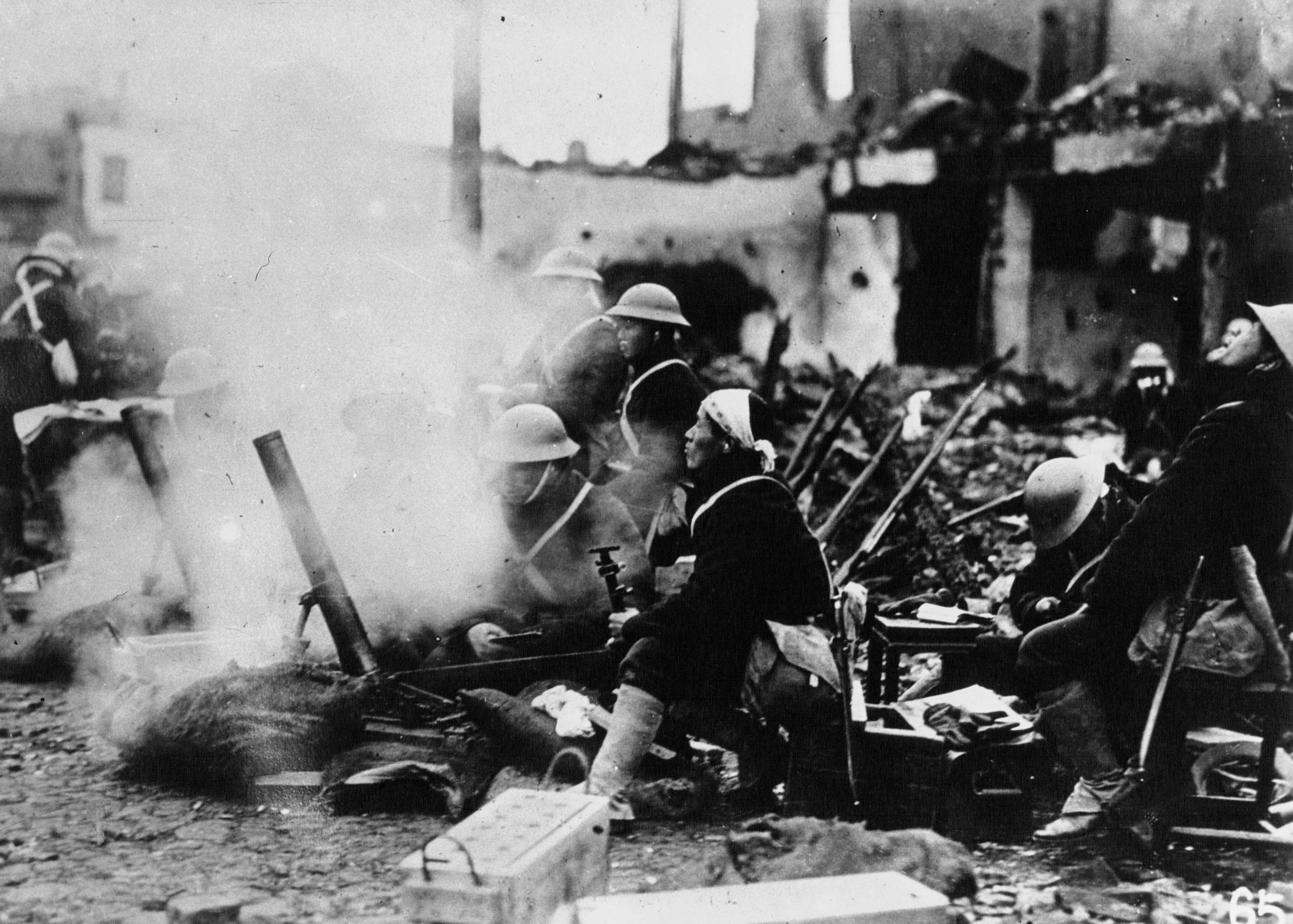
Japanese troops firing a mortar

The situation continued to deteriorate over the next week. By January 27, the Japanese military had already concentrated some 30 ships, a number of seaplanes, and nearly 2,000 troops around the shoreline of Shanghai to put down any resistance in the event that violence broke out. The military's justification was that it had to defend its citizens and their property. In addition, Hongkou district, where most of the Japanese citizens resided, had been assigned as the Japanese Defense Sector as part of the International Defense Scheme enacted by the foreign powers in Shanghai the year prior. The Japanese issued an ultimatum to the Shanghai Municipal Council demanding public condemnation and monetary compensation by the Chinese for any Japanese property damaged in the monk incident, and demanding that the Chinese government take active steps to suppress further anti-Japanese protests in the city. During the afternoon of January 28, the Shanghai Municipal Council agreed to these demands.

Throughout this period, the Chinese 19th Route Army had been massing outside the city, causing consternation to the civil Chinese administration of Shanghai and the foreign-run concessions. The 19th Route Army, unpaid by the bankrupt government, were seen at worst as potential looters who might enter the wealthy Settlement, posing as great a danger to Shanghai as the Japanese military. In the end, Shanghai donated a substantial bribe to the 19th Route Army, hoping that it would leave and not incite a Japanese attack.

However, shortly before midnight on January 28, plainclothes Chinese troops that had infiltrated the Hongkou district in the Japanese Defense Sector fired upon Japanese sailors leaving their headquarters. Three thousand Japanese sailors were mobilized in response, attacking the neighboring district of Zhabei and assuming control of the "de facto" Japanese settlement in Hongkou. In what was a surprising about-face for many, the 19th Route Army, which many had expected to leave after having been paid, put up fierce resistance. Also on the 28th, the Chinese Air Force dispatched nine planes to the Hongqiao Aerodrome, and the first aerial battle between Chinese and Japanese aircraft occurred on that day, although neither side suffered losses.

Though the opening battle took place between the Hongkou and Zhabei districts of extra-settlement Shanghai, the conflict eventually spread outwards towards Wusong and Jiangwan. The foreign concessions remained largely untouched by the conflict, and it was often the case that those in the Shanghai International Settlement would watch the war from the banks of Suzhou Creek. They could even visit the battle lines by virtue of their extraterritoriality. The Commercial Press and the Oriental Library were destroyed. On January 30, Chiang Kai-shek decided to temporarily relocate the capital from Nanjing to Luoyang as an emergency measure, due to the fact that Nanjing's proximity to Shanghai could make it a target.

Because Shanghai was a metropolitan city with many foreign interests invested in it, other countries, such as the United States, the United Kingdom and France, attempted to negotiate a ceasefire between Japan and China. Initially a ceasefire was brokered between the two nations, but it was subsequently broken, with both sides claiming the other side had reopened fire upon their troops. On February 12, American, British and French representatives brokered a half-day cease fire for humanitarian relief to civilians caught in the crossfire.

The Japanese issued another ultimatum, demanding that the Chinese Army retreat 20 km from the border of the Shanghai concessions, a demand promptly rejected. This only intensified fighting in Hongkou. The Japanese were unable to take the city by the middle of February. Subsequently, the number of Japanese troops was increased to nearly 18,000 with the arrival of the 9th Infantry Division and the IJA 24th Mixed Brigade, supported by a number of warships and airplanes.

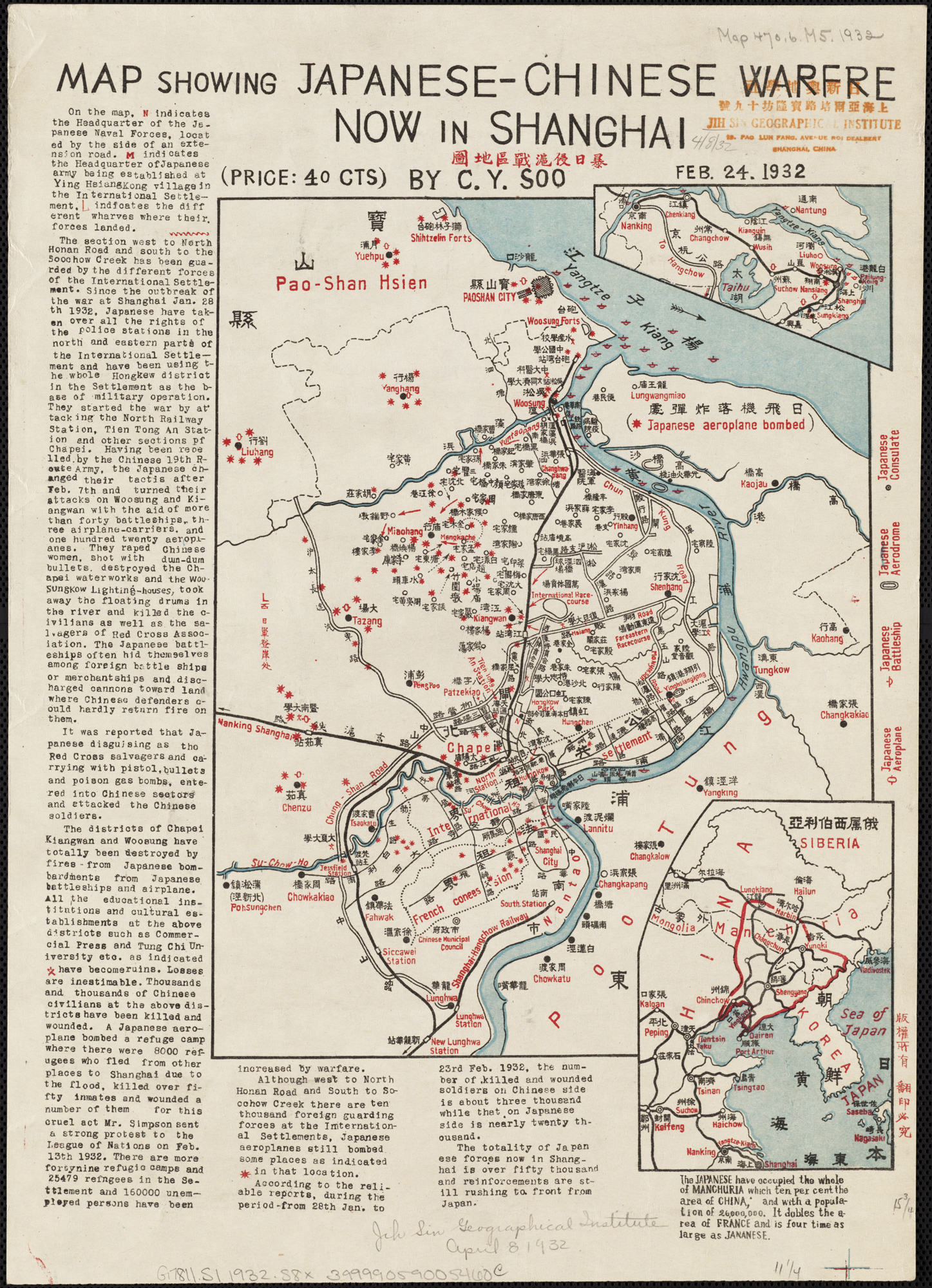
Map of the fighting in Shanghai

On February 14, Chiang Kai-shek sent the 5th Army, including the 87th and 88th divisions, into Shanghai.

On February 20, Japanese bombardments were increased to force the Chinese away from their defensive positions near Miaohang, while commercial and residential districts of the city were set on fire. The Chinese defensive positions deteriorated rapidly without naval and armored support, although the number of defenders was nearly five divisions. Meanwhile the Japanese forces had a single division—the IJA 9th Division, alongside the IJA 24th Mixed brigade and the Shanghai Naval Landing Force, numbering around 18,000 troops, also backed by aerial and naval bombardments.

On February 28, after a week of fierce fighting characterized by the stubborn resistance of the troops mainly from Guangdong, the Japanese, supported by superior artillery, took the village of Jiangwan (now Jiangwanzhen), north of Shanghai.

On March 1, the advance contingent of the Japanese 11th Infantry Division landed near Liuhe behind Chinese lines. The defenders launched a desperate counterattack but were unable to dislodge the Japanese. Following their encirclement, Chinese troops abandoned Shanghai and the surrounding area, and on March 3, the Japanese Commander gave the order to stop the fighting.

== Peace process ==
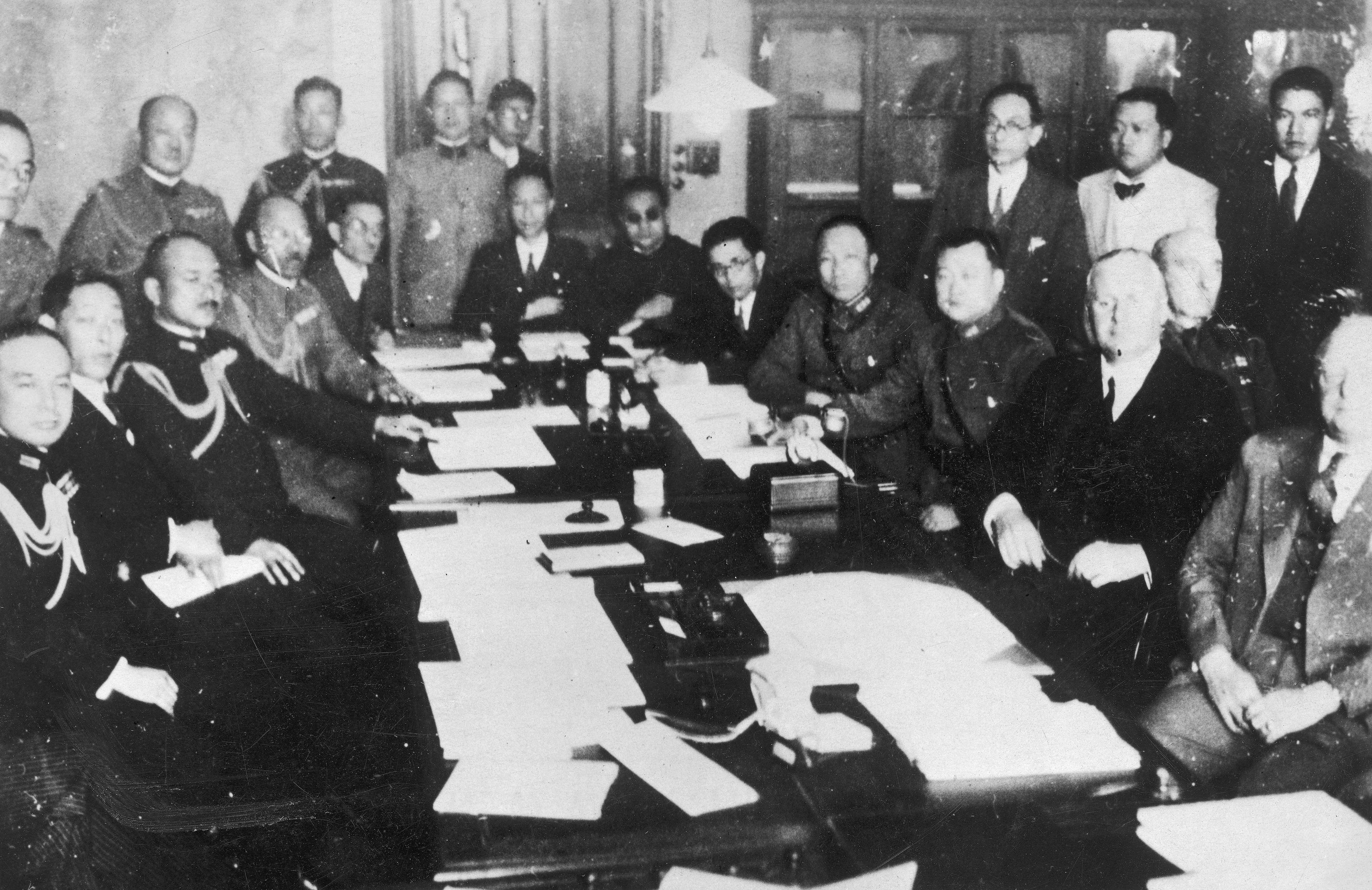
Signing ceremony of the Shanghai Ceasefire Agreement on May 5, 1932

On March 4, the League of Nations passed a resolution demanding a ceasefire, though sporadic fighting persisted. On March 6, the Chinese unilaterally agreed to stop fighting, although the Japanese rejected the ceasefire. On March 14, representatives from the League of Nations arrived at Shanghai to broker a negotiation with the Japanese. While negotiations were going on, intermittent fighting continued in both outlying areas and the city itself.

On May 5, China and Japan signed the Shanghai Ceasefire Agreement (simplified Chinese: 淞沪停战协定; traditional Chinese: 淞滬停戰協定; pinyin: Sōnghù Tíngzhàn Xiédìng). The agreement made Shanghai a demilitarized zone and forbade China to garrison troops in areas surrounding Shanghai, Suzhou, and Kunshan, while allowing the presence of a few Japanese units in the city. China was allowed to keep only a small police force within the city.

== Aftermath ==
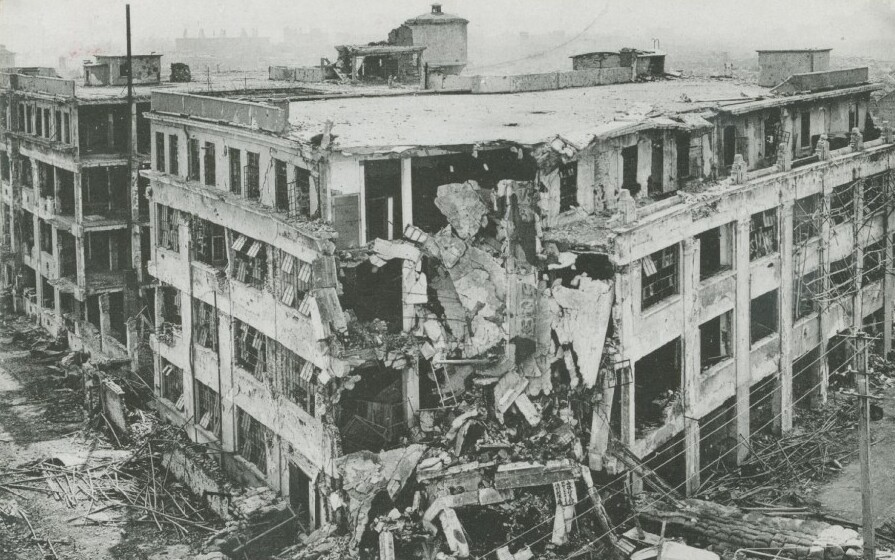
Ruins of the Commercial Press, a large publishing firm, after the battle

After the ceasefire was brokered, the 19th Army was reassigned by Chiang Kai-shek to suppress the Chinese Communist insurrection in Fujian. After winning some battles against the Communists, a peace agreement was negotiated. On November 22, the leadership of the 19th Route Army revolted against the Kuomintang government, and established the Fujian People's Government, independent of the Republic of China. This new government was not supported by all elements of the Communists and was quickly crushed by Chiang's armies in January 1934. The leaders of the 19th Route Army escaped to Hong Kong, and the rest of the army was disbanded and reassigned to other units of the National Revolutionary Army.

Yoshinori Shirakawa, the commander of the Shanghai Expeditionary Army and joint leader of the Japanese forces, was severely wounded by Korean nationalist Yoon Bong-Gil during a birthday celebration for Emperor Hirohito held at Shanghai's Hongkou Park and died of his injuries on May 26.

== See also ==
- Events preceding World War II in Asia
  - Jinan incident (May 1928)
  - Huanggutun incident (Japanese assassination of the Chinese head of state Generalissimo Zhang Zuolin on 4 June 1928)
- Second Sino-Japanese War
  - Japanese invasion of Manchuria
    - Mukden Incident (18 September 1931)
  - Defense of the Great Wall (1933)
  - Marco Polo Bridge Incident (7 July 1937)
  - Battle of Shanghai (1937)
- Robert McCawley Short
- Toshio Kuroiwa
