= Preparatory Committee for the New Political Consultative Conference =

The Preparatory Committee for the New Political Consultative Conference was the organization that prepared for the Chinese People's Political Consultative Conference in 1949.

== Background ==
On April 30, 1948, the Central Committee of the Chinese Communist Party issued a slogan to commemorate the May 1 Labor Day (known as the May 1st slogan), calling on all democratic parties to jointly convene a new Political Consultative Conference (the old Political Consultative Conference had broken up in 1946) and establish a democratic coalition government. After that, all democratic parties, people's organizations, non-party democrats and overseas Chinese issued statements, declarations and telegrams in response to the "May 1 slogan". Subsequently, representatives of democratic parties, people's organizations, democrats from all walks of life, ethnic minorities and overseas Chinese who responded to the CCP Central Committee's "May 1 slogan" arrived in the liberated areas from all over China and overseas to discuss with CCP representatives the convening of a new Political Consultative Conference.

On September 18, 1948, when the first group of democratic figures, including Shen Junru, Tan Pingshan, Zhang Bojun, and Cai Tingkai, who were heading north from Hong Kong to the Northeast Liberated Area, had already set off but had not yet arrived, the CCP Central Committee sent a telegram to the Central Committee's Northeast Bureau, requesting that after the democratic figures arrived in Harbin, Gao Gang, Luo Fu, and Lin Feng, on behalf of the Northeast Bureau, consult the democratic figures on the convening of a new political consultative conference. After Fu Dingyi, Wu Han, and Liu Qingyang, democratic figures from Beijing, arrived in Lijiazhuang, Pingshan County, Hebei, Zhou Enlai visited them several times to listen to their opinions on the preparations for the new political consultative conference. Subsequently, Zhou drafted a document on various issues concerning the convening of a new political consultative conference based on the discussions between himself and the CCP's United Front Work Department and the democratic figures in Lijiazhuang. After being approved by CCP Chairman Mao Zedong on October 8, 1948, the Central Committee sent a telegram on various issues concerning the convening of a new political consultative conference to Gao Gang and Li Fuchun of the Northeast Bureau in the name of the Central Committee, soliciting opinions from various democratic parties and democratic figures.

The document stated that "the CCP and representatives of the major democratic parties, people's organizations and non-party democrats who support the fifth item of the CCP Central Committee's 'May 1st slogan'" would be participants in the preparatory meeting of the new Political Consultative Conference. This determined the basic conditions, standards and scope for participating parties in the future multi-party cooperation of the People's Republic of China. In the appendix to the document, "List of units proposed to be invited to participate in the new CPPCC", the democratic parties were ranked as follows: Revolutionary Committee of the Chinese Kuomintang, China Democratic League, China Democratic Progressive Party, China Zhi Gong Party, Chinese Peasants' and Workers' Democratic Party, China National Salvation Association, China Democratic League, China National Democratic Construction Association, and China Democratic National Construction Association. In "Questions on the convening of a new Political Consultative Conference", the CCP stated: "I would like to ask you to consider whether the units of the proposed democratic parties, people's organizations and non-party democrats are appropriate, and whether there are any additions or reductions."

At that time, most of the democratic parties and democratic figures were still in Hong Kong or on their way north to the liberated areas. Shen Junru and others hoped that the CCP could forward the draft document "On the Convening of a New Political Consultative Conference" to Hong Kong in order to solicit the opinions of democratic figures in Hong Kong. On October 30, 1948, the Central Committee sent a telegram to the Hong Kong Branch of the Central Committee, asking the latter to copy it to the various party figures in Hong Kong, "and have Pan Hannian and Lian Guan visit them separately or invite them to have a discussion together to solicit their opinions".

From September 1948 to January 1949, three groups of democratic personages traveled north from Hong Kong to the Northeast Liberated Area. The Central Committee appointed Gao Gang and Li Fuchun to organize two seminars to discuss the convening, time, location, participants, and discussion items of the new Political Consultative Conference. Fang Fang and Pan Hannian, the heads of the Central Committee's Hong Kong Branch, also sought the opinions of various democratic parties in Hong Kong on the preparations for the new Political Consultative Conference in accordance with the Central Committee's instructions. At the same time, the United Front Work Department also organized several seminars with democratic personages such as Fu Dingyi, Wu Han, Hu Yuzhi, Zhou Xinmin, Chu Tunan, Lei Jieqiong, and Tian Han, who arrived at Lijiazhuang, where the United Front Work Department was located, from Shanghai, Beijing, and Tianjin to discuss the “Draft of Various Issues Concerning the Convening of a New Political Consultative Conference” drafted by Zhou Enlai and the “Draft Organizational Regulations of the Preparatory Committee for the New Political Consultative Conference” drafted by the United Front Work Department and approved by Zhou Enlai, to listen to their opinions.

On November 25, 1948, representatives of the Central Committee and representatives of democratic personages from all walks of life who arrived in Harbin reached an agreement on the establishment of a preparatory committee for the new political consultative conference. The agreement stated that the preparatory committee for the new political consultative conference should be composed of representatives of the CCP and major democratic parties, people's organizations, and non-party democratic personages who supported the fifth item of the Central Committee's "May 1st slogan". A total of 23 units participated, including the party participating units: the CCP, the Revolutionary Committee of the Chinese Kuomintang, the China Democratic League, the China Democratic Progressive Party, the Zhi Gong Party, the Peasants and Workers Democratic Party, the China National Salvation Association, the China Democratic League, the China Democratic National Construction Association, and non-party democratic personages. The ranking of the democratic parties was exactly the same as that proposed by the CCP in "On the Convening of a New Political Consultative Conference".

According to the original plan, the preparatory meeting of the New Political Consultative Conference was to be held in Harbin in the autumn of 1948. However, due to the rapid development of the Second Civil War between the Kuomintang and the Communist Party, and the peaceful liberation of Beijing on January 31, 1949, it was decided to hold the meeting in Beijing instead. In March 1949, the Second Plenary Session of the Seventh Central Committee of the Chinese Communist Party approved the proposal for a new Political Consultative Conference and the establishment of a democratic coalition government. Soon after, the Kuomintang- Communist peace talks in Beijing broke down, and the Chinese People's Liberation Army successively captured Nanjing and Shanghai in the Battle of Crossing the Yangtze River. The preparatory work for the New Political Consultative Conference was rapidly advanced.

During this process, Zhou Enlai reviewed and revised the "List of Candidates for Democratic Personages from Various Units to Participate in the Preparatory Committee of the New Political Consultative Conference" in Xibaipo, and printed it into a book together with the "Agreement on Various Issues Concerning the New Political Consultative Conference" and other documents, and sent it to all parties for consultation.

On March 10, 1949, after arriving in Beijing, Li Weihan had extensive exchanges with various democratic parties and democratic figures. He visited more than 20 democratic parties and non-party democratic figures, including Li Jishen, Shen Junru, Guo Moruo, Tan Pingshan, Zhou Jianren, Ma Xulun, and Cai Tingkai, to solicit their opinions on the preparation of a new Political Consultative Conference and party work. From May 23 to 28, 1949, Zhou Enlai and Lin Boqu invited leaders of various democratic parties and people's organizations to discuss specific issues regarding the convening of a new Political Consultative Conference.

On June 11, 1949, the first preparatory meeting of the New Political Consultative Conference was held at Shuangqing Villa, Mao Zedong's residence in Xiangshan, Beijing. The meeting passed the "List of Representatives of Various Units Participating in the Preparatory Meeting of the New Political Consultative Conference", confirming that the units participating in the New Political Consultative Conference (abbreviated as "New Political Consultative Conference") would still be 23, but the order of the various democratic parties was adjusted to: Revolutionary Committee of the Chinese Kuomintang, China Democratic League, China Democratic National Construction Association, China Democratic Progressive Party, Peasants and Workers Democratic Party, China National Salvation Association, China Democratic League, China Democratic Promotion Association, and China Zhi Gong Party.

== Convening ==
On June 15, 1949, the preparatory committee of the New Political Consultative Conference was established in the Qinzheng Hall of Zhongnanhai in Beijing and held its first plenary session, which ended on June 19. When the meeting opened on June 15, seven people, including Chairman Mao Zedong, Commander-in-Chief of the People's Liberation Army Zhu De, Li Jishen, Shen Junru, Guo Moruo, Chen Shutong, and Tan Kah Kee, delivered speeches. At the speech, Mao proposed "building a brand-new, powerful, and truly democratic people's republic", proposing the new state be called the "People's Democratic Republic of China"; this was later shortened to the "People's Republic of China".

On June 16, 1949, the first plenary session of the Preparatory Committee adopted the "Organizational Regulations of the Preparatory Committee of the New Political Consultative Conference". On June 19, 1949, the first plenary session of the Preparatory Committee was held, with Zhou Enlai as the executive chairman. At the meeting, Li Weihan, on behalf of the first group, explained the "Draft Regulations on Units Participating in the New Political Consultative Conference and Their Representative Quotas". The meeting passed the "Draft Regulations on Units Participating in the New Political Consultative Conference and Their Representative Quotas".

The Preparatory Committee of the New Political Consultative Conference was responsible for all preparatory matters for the New Political Consultative Conference. Its key tasks included:

1. To decide on and invite units and representatives to participate in the New Political Consultative Conference;
2. To decide on the meeting time, venue and agenda of the New Political Consultative Conference;
3. To draft the organizational regulations for the New Political Consultative Conference;
4. To formulate a draft common programme;
5. Proposed a plan to establish the government of the People's Republic of China.

The Preparatory Committee of the New Political Consultative Conference held two plenary sessions and eight standing committee meetings in total, preparing for the convening of the First Plenary Session of the Chinese People's Political Consultative Conference.

- The first plenary session of the Preparatory Committee of the New Political Consultative Conference was held in Beijing from June 15 to 19, 1949. The meeting listened to the explanation of Zhou Enlai, a member of the Political Bureau of the CCP Central Committee, on the "Draft Organizational Regulations of the Preparatory Committee of the New Political Consultative Conference" and amended and passed the regulations. Based on the regulations, the meeting elected Mao Zedong and 21 other people to form the Standing Committee of the Preparatory Committee of the New Political Consultative Conference. The meeting also passed the "Regulations on the Units and the Number of Representatives Participating in the New Political Consultative Conference".
- The second plenary session of the Preparatory Committee of the New Political Consultative Conference was held in Beijing on September 17, 1949. Zhou Enlai, deputy director of the Standing Committee of the Preparatory Committee of the New Political Consultative Conference, reported on the preparatory work over the past three months. The meeting unanimously passed the change of the name of the "New Political Consultative Conference" to "Chinese People's Political Consultative Conference". The meeting also unanimously passed the "Draft Organization Law of the Chinese People's Political Consultative Conference" and the "Draft Organization Law of the Central People's Government of the People's Republic of China".
- The first meeting of the Standing Committee of the Preparatory Committee of the New Political Consultative Conference was held in Beijing on June 16. The meeting elected the leadership of the Standing Committee and set up relevant working bodies. The meeting passed the "Methods for Representatives of Various Units to Participate in Groups", stipulating that the Preparatory Committee of the New Political Consultative Conference would set up six groups; the meeting also passed the "Specific Methods for the Implementation of Voting at the Plenary Session of the Preparatory Committee of the New Political Consultative Conference".
- The second meeting of the Standing Committee of the Preparatory Committee for the New Political Consultative Conference was held in Beijing on June 21. The meeting discussed the preparatory and promotion work of industrial and commercial, educational, social science and other groups, and reviewed and revised the "Regulations on the Units and Representatives Participating in the New Political Consultative Conference".
- The third meeting of the Standing Committee of the Preparatory Committee of the New Political Consultative Conference was held in Beijing on July 5. The meeting reviewed and passed the "Declaration of the Parties and Groups of the Preparatory Committee of the New Political Consultative Conference to Commemorate the Twelfth Anniversary of the July 7th Anti-Japanese War" (later published on July 7). The meeting decided to set up a personnel office and a security department in the Preparatory Committee of the New Political Consultative Conference. The meeting discussed the preparation of the three groups in the fields of industry and commerce, education, and social sciences.
- The fourth meeting of the Standing Committee of the Preparatory Committee for the New Political Consultative Conference was held in Beijing on August 26. Tan Pingshan made a report on the "Organizational Law of the Chinese People's Political Consultative Conference". Zhou Enlai made a speech on "The Nature and Role of the People's Political Consultative Conference".
- The fifth meeting of the Standing Committee of the Preparatory Committee of the New Political Consultative Conference was held in Beijing on September 13. The meeting discussed and revised the "Common Program of the Chinese People's Political Consultative Conference (Draft)" and decided to submit it to all representatives of the Preparatory Committee of the New Political Consultative Conference and representatives of the New Political Consultative Conference who arrived in Beijing for group discussion.
- The Sixth Meeting of the Standing Committee of the Preparatory Committee for the New Political Consultative Conference was held in Beijing on September 16. The meeting passed the draft amendments to the "Organization Law of the Chinese People's Political Consultative Conference", the draft amendments to the "Organization Law of the Central People's Government of the People's Republic of China", and the draft amendments to the Common Program of the Chinese People's Political Consultative Conference. The meeting agreed to transfer the work of drafting the Draft Declaration of the First Plenary Session of the Chinese People's Political Consultative Conference and drafting the national flag and national emblem to the presidium of the Chinese People's Political Consultative Conference for decision.
- The Seventh Meeting of the Standing Committee of the Preparatory Committee for the New Political Consultative Conference was held in Beijing on September 17. The meeting adopted the "Draft List of the Presidium of the First Plenary Session of the Chinese People's Political Consultative Conference".
- The 8th meeting of the Standing Committee of the Preparatory Committee for the New Political Consultative Conference was held in Beijing on September 20. The meeting approved the agenda of the First Plenary Session of the Chinese People's Political Consultative Conference and revised and approved the "Draft Rules of Procedure for the First Plenary Session of the Chinese People's Political Consultative Conference".

== Articles of association ==
On June 16, 1949, the first plenary session of the Preparatory Committee of the New Political Consultative Conference adopted the "Organizational Regulations of the Preparatory Committee of the New Political Consultative Conference":

Organizational Regulations of the Preparatory Committee of the New Political Consultative Conference

Article 1 The New Political Consultative Conference is composed of representatives of the democratic parties, people's organizations, people's governments of the liberated areas, the People's Liberation Army, domestic ethnic minorities, overseas Chinese, non-party members and democratic personages from all walks of life who support new democracy, oppose imperialism, feudalism, and bureaucratic capitalism, and agree to mobilize all the people's democratic forces, overthrow the reactionary rule of the Kuomintang, and establish a people's democratic republic. All reactionary parties and reactionary elements under the reactionary Kuomintang government system are not allowed to participate.

Based on the above principles, the Preparatory Committee of the New Political Consultative Conference is composed of the original proposer of the New Political Consultative Conference, the Chinese Communist Party, and 23 other units that support the fifth item of the CCP's "May 1" slogan in 1948, including the following democratic parties, people's organizations and non-partisan democrats.

- (1) Chinese Communist Party;
- (2) Revolutionary Committee of the Chinese Kuomintang;
- (3) China Democratic League;
- (4) China National Democratic Construction Association;
- (5) Non-partisan democrats;
- (6) China Association for Promoting Democracy;
- (7) Chinese Peasants' and Workers' Democratic Party;
- (8) Chinese People's National Salvation Association;
- (9) Three Principles of the People Comrades Association;
- (10) Kuomintang Democratic Promotion Association;
- (11) China Zhi Gong Party;
- (12) Chinese People's Liberation Army;
- (13) All-China Federation of Trade Unions;
- (14) Peasant organizations in the liberated areas;
- (15) Industrial democrats;
- (16) Democratic figures in the cultural field;
- (17) Professor of Democracy;
- (18) All-China Democratic Youth Federation;
- (19) All-China Democratic Women's Federation;
- (20) All-China Students' Federation;
- (21) Shanghai Federation of People's Organizations;
- (22) Domestic ethnic minorities;
- (23) Overseas Chinese democrats.

Article 2 The number of preparatory representatives of each unit in the preceding article who will participate in the preparatory meeting of the New Political Consultative Conference shall be four to seven, and the number of representatives shall be determined by consultation according to the situation of each unit. The candidates for the preparatory representatives of each unit shall be proposed by each unit and approved by the units participating in the preparatory meeting of the New Political Consultative Conference. The preparatory representatives of the units in Articles 5, 15, 16, 17, 22, and 23 of the preceding article shall be jointly nominated by the other units in the preparatory meeting of the New Political Consultative Conference.

Article 3 The Preparatory Committee of the New Political Consultative Conference shall be responsible for all preparatory matters for the New Political Consultative Conference. Its core tasks are:

- (1) To decide on and invite the units and representatives to participate in the New Political Consultative Conference;
- (2) To decide on the time, place and agenda of the New Political Consultative Conference;
- (3) To draft the organizational rules for the New Political Consultative Conference;
- (4) To formulate a draft common programme;
- (5) Propose a plan for establishing the government of the People's Republic of China.

Article 4 The Preparatory Committee for the New Political Consultative Conference shall have 21 standing members, who shall form the Standing Committee to handle daily affairs and shall be nominated by all units through consultation. The Standing Committee shall have one chairman and five vice-chairmen, who shall be elected by the Standing Committee and preside over the work of the Standing Committee.

Article 5 The Standing Committee shall have a Secretary-General and several Deputy Secretaries-General to assist the Standing Committee and the Director and Deputy Directors in their work. Their selection shall be decided by the Standing Committee.

Article 6 The Standing Committee shall establish necessary working bodies, and their organization and personnel shall be determined by the Secretary-General upon the recommendation of the Standing Committee.

Article 7 The Standing Committee may establish various groups according to work needs, and the Standing Committee shall designate the leader and deputy leader of each group.

Article 8 The New Political Consultative Conference Preparatory Committee shall be convened with the attendance of more than half of the participating units. When voting, each unit shall have one vote regardless of the number of members. General resolutions shall be adopted by the majority and implemented by all. However, for resolutions on basic policies, such as the third, fourth and fifth clauses of Article 3, those who disagree with the resolution after the majority adoption shall have the freedom to re-propose it at the opening of the New Political Consultative Conference, or not to sign, or to withdraw from the New Political Consultative Conference Preparatory Committee.

Article 9 These Regulations shall come into force after being approved by the plenary session of the Preparatory Committee of the New Political Consultative Conference.

== Standing Committee ==
The first plenary session of the Preparatory Committee of the New Political Consultative Conference elected Mao Zedong and 21 other people to form the Standing Committee, which was responsible for the daily affairs of the Preparatory Committee of the New Political Consultative Conference. In accordance with Articles 4 and 5 of the Organizational Regulations of the Preparatory Committee of the New Political Consultative Conference, the list of standing committee members of the Preparatory Committee of the New Political Consultative Conference, its chairman, vice-chairmen, secretary-general and deputy secretary-general is as follows:

- Chairman of the Standing Committee: Mao Zedong
- Vice Chairmen of the Standing Committee: Zhou Enlai, Li Jishen, Shen Junru, Guo Moruo, Chen Shutong
- Standing Committee members (in order of the number of strokes in their surnames): Mao Zedong, Zhu De, Li Jishen, Li Lisan, Shen Junru, Shen Yanbing, Zhou Enlai, Lin Boqu, Ma Xulun, Ma Yinchu, Ulanhu, (Yun Ze), Zhang Bojun, Zhang Lan, Zhang Xiruo, Guo Moruo, Chen Shutong, Chen Jiageng, Huang Yanpei, Cai Tingkai, Cai Chang, Tan Pingshan
- Secretary General: Li Weihan
- Deputy Secretaries-General (in order of the number of strokes in their surnames): Yu Xinqing, Shen Tilan, Zhou Xinmin, Lian Guan, Huan Xiang, Sun Qimeng, Qi Yanming, Yan Baohang, Luo Shuzhang

== Groups ==
On June 16, 1949, the first meeting of the Standing Committee of the Preparatory Committee of the New Political Consultative Conference decided to establish six groups, which would be led by the Standing Committee of the Preparatory Committee of the New Political Consultative Conference. The head and deputy head of each group would be appointed by the Standing Committee of the Preparatory Committee of the New Political Consultative Conference.

=== The First Group ===
Group 1 (to determine the number of units and representatives to participate in the New Political Consultative Conference)

- Team Leader: Li Weihan
- Deputy Group Leader: Zhang Bojun
- Members: Li Jishen, Shen Junru, Huang Yanpei, Ma Yinchu, Ma Xulun, Peng Zemin, Cao Mengjun, Tan Pingshan, Cai Tingkai, Chen Qiyou, Nie Rongzhen, Li Lisan, Zhu Fusheng, Chen Shutong, Zeng Zhaolun, Xu Deheng, Feng Wenbin, Cai Chang, Huang Zhensheng (replaced by Huang Hezhen), Luo Shuzhang, Tianbao, Chen Qiyuan

The task of the first group was to draft the units and the number of representatives of each unit to participate in the "New Political Consultative Conference" (later renamed the Chinese People's Political Consultative Conference). Based on the previous deliberations and consultations, the first group drafted the "Regulations on the Units and Representatives of the New Political Consultative Conference (Draft)", which was submitted to the first plenary meeting of the Preparatory Committee of the New Political Consultative Conference for approval on June 19. According to the regulations, there were 45 units participating in the New Political Consultative Conference, with 510 representatives. In addition, there were "specially invited persons", whose representative qualifications, quotas and candidates were to be agreed upon by the Standing Committee of the Preparatory Committee of the New Political Consultative Conference. After the first plenary meeting of the Preparatory Committee of the New Political Consultative Conference, according to the regulations adopted at the meeting, one of the key tasks of the Preparatory Committee of the New Political Consultative Conference was to promote the establishment of industrial and commercial, educational, social science and other groups, and to negotiate the list of representatives of each unit. At this point, the work of the first group of the Preparatory Committee was completed.

=== The Second Group ===
Group 2 (Drafting the Organizational Regulations of the New Political Consultative Conference)

- Team leader: Tan Pingshan
- Deputy Group Leader: Zhou Xinmin
- Team members: Lin Zuhan, Li Dequan, Shi Fuliang (replaced by Sun Qimeng), Fu Dingyi, Wang Shaoao, Guo Guanjie, Shi Liang (replaced by Zhang Manyun), Guo Chuntao (replaced by Wu Maosun), Jiang Guangnai (replaced by Qin Yuanbang), Lei Rongke, Yi Lirong, Zheng Zhenduo, Yu Huancheng (replaced by Feng Yunhe), Ye Shengtao, Shen Zijiu, Li Xiuzhen, Chen Zhenzhong (replaced by Ge Zhicheng), Tianbao, Dai Ziliang

The task of the second group was to draft the organizational regulations of the New Political Consultative Conference (later named "Organization Law of the Chinese People's Political Consultative Conference"). The group leader and deputy group leader were appointed by the Standing Committee of the Preparatory Committee of the New Political Consultative Conference, and were respectively Tan Pingshan, a member of the Standing Committee of the Preparatory Committee, and Zhou Xinmin, deputy secretary-general. The second group held four plenary sessions. After exchanging opinions on the work of the group at the first meeting, Tan Pingshan, Zhou Xinmin, Wang Shaoguo, Ye Shengtao, and Shen Zijiu were appointed to draft the discussion outline. The second meeting discussed the outline and related issues, and elected Tan Pingshan, Zhou Xinmin, Ye Shengtao, Jiang Guangnai (replaced by Qin Yuanbang), Shen Zijiu, Shi Liang, Guo Chuntao, Lin Zuhan, and Yi Lirong to form a drafting committee, with Zhou Xinmin and Shi Liang drafting the first draft. After the first draft was drafted, opinions were sought from all parties many times, and it was revised at the second plenary meeting of the group and submitted to the fourth meeting of the Standing Committee of the Preparatory Committee of the New Political Consultative Conference for approval. After that, the group held its fourth plenary session, reported the situation and slightly revised the text, and reported it to the Standing Committee of the Preparatory Committee of the New Political Consultative Conference for submission to the second plenary session of the Preparatory Committee of the New Political Consultative Conference for deliberation on September 17. After the "Draft Organization Law of the Chinese People's Political Consultative Conference" was passed at the second plenary session of the Preparatory Committee of the New Political Consultative Conference, the work of the second group of the Preparatory Committee was completed.

=== The Third Group ===
Group 3 (Drafting a Common Programme)

- Group Leader: Zhou Enlai
- Deputy Group Leader: Xu Deheng
- Members: Chen Shaoxian, Zhang Bojun, Zhang Naiqi, Li Da, Xu Guangping, Ji Fang (represented by Yan Xinmin), Shen Zhiyuan, Xu Baoju, Chen Cisheng, Huang Dingchen, Peng Dehuai (represented by Luo Ruiqing), Zhu Xuefan, Zhang Ye, Li Zhuchen, Hou Wailu, Deng Chumin, Liao Chengzhi, Deng Yingchao, Xie Bangding, Zhou Jianren, Yang Jingren, Fei Zhendong, Luo Longji

The task of the third group was to draft the Common Program of the New Political Consultative Conference (later named Common Program of the Chinese People's Political Consultative Conference). The third group was divided into five groups: politics and law, finance and economy, national defense and diplomacy, culture and education, and others (including overseas Chinese, ethnic minorities, mass organizations, religion, etc.). The convener of the finance and economy group was Zhang Naiqi. The third group decided that the Chinese Communist Party would be responsible for drafting the first draft of the Common Program of the New Political Consultative Conference. After the first draft was completed, it was discussed twice in groups by representatives from all walks of life who arrived in Beijing one after another, three times by the third group, and twice by the Standing Committee of the Preparatory Committee of the New Political Consultative Conference. On September 17, 1949, the second plenary meeting of the Preparatory Committee of the New Political Consultative Conference reviewed and passed the "Common Program of the Chinese People's Political Consultative Conference (Draft)", and the work of the third group of the Preparatory Committee was completed.

=== The Fourth Group ===
Group 4 (Drafting the Government Plan of the People's Republic of China)

- Team leader: Dong Biwu
- Deputy Group Leader: Huang Yanpei (replaced by Zhang Xiruo when away)
- Members: Zhang Wen, Shen Junru, Zhang Dongsun, Hu Juewen (replaced by Yan Baohang), Lin Liru, Lin Handa, Han Zhao'e, Li Zhangda (replaced by Qian Jiaju), Wang Kunlun, Li Minxin, Chen Qiyou, Liu Bocheng (replaced by Teng Daiyuan), Qiu Jin, Shi Zhenming, Yu Huancheng (replaced by Feng Yunhe), Zhang Zhirang, Xie Xuehong, Zhang Qinqiu (replaced by Shen Zijiu when he left Beijing), Nie Weiqing, Tang Guifen (replaced by Lei Jieqiong), Zhu Dehai

The task of the fourth group was to draft a plan for the government of the People's Republic of China (later named "Organization Law of the Central People's Government of the People's Republic of China"). The first plenary meeting of the fourth group elected a seven-member committee with Zhang Zhirang as the convener to prepare a discussion outline. The second plenary meeting of the fourth group discussed the "Basic Issues in the Government Organization Law" proposed by the Outline Drafting Committee, and discussed issues such as the name and nature of the state, the basic principles of government organization, the method of forming the highest political power organ, and the organization and affiliation of the People's Government Committee, the People's Revolutionary Military Commission, the People's Supervisory Committee, the People's Court, and the People's Procuratorate. Dong Biwu, Zhang Xiruo, Yan Baohang, Wang Kunlun, and Zhang Zhirang were elected to draft the preliminary draft of the government organization law. The third plenary meeting of the fourth group amended and approved the preliminary draft of the government organization law drafted by Dong Biwu and the other five people, and submitted it to the Standing Committee of the Preparatory Committee of the New Political Consultative Conference for deliberation. The Standing Committee of the Preparatory Committee of the New Political Consultative Conference designated Dong Biwu, Huang Yanpei, Ma Xulun, Zhang Xiruo, and Li Lisan to revise the preliminary draft, which was then reviewed and revised at the fifth meeting of the Standing Committee of the Preparatory Committee of the New Political Consultative Conference. On September 17, 1949, the Second Plenary Session of the Preparatory Committee of the New Political Consultative Conference passed the "Organic Law of the Central People's Government of the People's Republic of China (Draft)", and the work of the Fourth Group of the Preparatory Committee was completed.

=== The Fifth Group ===
Group 5 (Drafting the Declaration)

- Group Leader: Guo Moruo
- Deputy Group Leader: Chen Shaoxian
- Team members: Mei Gongbin (replaced by Lü Jiyi), Chu Tunan, Wu Yaozong, Qiu Zhe, Hu Yuzhi, Chen Mingshu, Jiang Guangnai (replaced by Qin Yuanbang), Huang Dingchen, Yang Gengtian, Li Zhuchen, Hong Shen, Hu Qiaomu, Deng Yuzhi, Yun Ze (replaced by Kuibi)

The task of the Fifth Group was to draft the declaration of the New Political Consultative Conference (later named Declaration of the First Plenary Session of the Chinese People's Political Consultative Conference). The First Plenary Session of the Fifth Group determined that Guo Moruo, Hu Yuzhi and Hu Qiaomu would draft the first draft of the declaration. After the meeting, the Fifth Group also took on the task of drafting the "Declaration of the Parties and Groups Participating in the Preparatory Committee of the New Political Consultative Conference to Commemorate the Twelfth Anniversary of the July 7th Anti-Japanese War". The Second Plenary Session of the Fifth Group revised the draft declaration of the conference proposed by Guo Moruo and others. Because the work of drafting the declaration of the conference was not completed, on September 17, the Second Plenary Session of the Preparatory Committee of the New Political Consultative Conference decided to transfer the work to the First Plenary Session of the Chinese People's Political Consultative Conference, and the Fifth Group, which was originally responsible for the work, submitted a report to the Presidium of the First Plenary Session of the Chinese People's Political Consultative Conference. On September 22, the First Plenary Session of the Chinese People's Political Consultative Conference decided to establish a declaration drafting committee, and the work of the Fifth Group of the Preparatory Committee was completed.

=== The Sixth Group ===
Group Six (Drafting the National Flag, National Emblem and National Anthem Plan)

- Team leader: Ma Xulun
- Deputy Group Leader: Ye Jianying (Soon, due to Ye Jianying's busy work, Shen Yanbing was appointed as the deputy group leader to oversee daily work )
- Members: Zhang Xiruo, Tian Han, Shen Yanbing, Ma Yinchu, Zheng Zhenduo, Guo Moruo, Jian Bozan, Qian Sanqiang, Cai Chang, Li Lisan, Zhang Lan (Liu Wangli in the Ming Dynasty), Chen Jiageng, Ouyang Yuqian, Liao Chengzhi

The task of the Sixth Group was to draft the national flag, national emblem, and national anthem. On July 4, 1949, the Sixth Group held its first meeting and decided to publicly solicit designs for the national flag, national emblem, and national anthem. It drafted the rules for soliciting designs for the national flag, national emblem, and national anthem, established the National Flag, National Emblem Design Selection Committee, and the National Anthem Lyrics and Lyrics Selection Committee, and decided to publicly issue a notice to solicit designs for the national flag, national emblem, and national anthem. On August 5, the Sixth Group held its second meeting and decided to hire Xu Beihong, Liang Sicheng, and Ai Qing as consultants for the National Flag and National Emblem Design Selection Committee, and Ma Sicong, Lü Ji, He Luting, and Yao Jinxin as consultants for the National Anthem Lyrics and Lyrics Selection Committee. The Sixth Group and the experts participating in the two selection committees discussed the collected designs for the national flag, national emblem, and national anthem lyrics and lyrics for many times, and reported their preliminary opinions to the Standing Committee of the Preparatory Committee for the New Political Consultative Conference. On September 17, the Second Plenary Session of the Preparatory Committee of the New Political Consultative Conference decided to transfer the work of drafting the national flag, national emblem, and national anthem to the First Plenary Session of the Chinese People's Political Consultative Conference, and the Sixth Group, which was originally responsible for this work, submitted a report to the Presidium of the First Plenary Session of the Chinese People's Political Consultative Conference. On September 22, the Fifth Meeting of the Sixth Group was held to study the capital, calendar, and national flag, and put forward preliminary opinions. On the same day, the First Plenary Session of the Chinese People's Political Consultative Conference decided to establish a review committee for the national flag, national emblem, national anthem, capital, and calendar, and the work of the Sixth Group of the Preparatory Committee was completed.

== CPPCC Emblem ==
In July 1949, the Fifth Working Meeting of the Secretary-General's Office of the Preparatory Committee of the New CPPCC decided to formulate the emblem of the Chinese People's Political Consultative Conference (hereinafter referred to as the CPPCC emblem). Finally, the design by Zhang Ding and Zhou Lingzhao was selected from a large number of designs. After Zhou Enlai's instruction, it was circulated to the Standing Committee members of the Preparatory Committee of the New CPPCC and was formulated and approved by the Preparatory Committee of the New CPPCC in July 1949. With the approval of Mao Zedong, the Chairman of the Standing Committee of the Preparatory Committee of the New CPPCC, it was officially used for the first time at the First Plenary Session of the Chinese People's Political Consultative Conference, which opened on September 21, 1949.
