= Jiaochangkou Incident =

1946 political riot in Chongqing, China

The Jiaochangkou incident (simplified Chinese: 较场口事件; traditional Chinese: 較場口事件; pinyin: jiàochǎngkǒu shìjiàn) was a political riot that took place on 10 February 1946 in Jiaochangkou in the centre of Chongqing City, which was the wartime capital of the Republic of China and declared the second capital (Chinese: 陪都) after the war by the Nationalist (Kuomintang or KMT)-led government. During 1945–46, KMT and the Chinese Communist Party (CCP) held truce and political negotiations over the future of China in the city. The incident marked an open rivalry between the two parties, which eventually led to a civil war that ended up with a CCP victory.

== Background ==
During 1945–47, under United States mediation, KMT and CCP agreed to negotiate a coalition government. One of the results of the negotiations was the Double Tenth Agreement between the two parties, where they agreed to hold an open multi-party talks named Political Consultative Conference (PCC) as soon as possible.

The PCC was held in Chongqing during 10–31 January 1946, which received both local and nationwide attention. The CCP organised many support meetings for these conference across the country, which were routinely disrupted by the secret police of the Nationalist government attempting to encourage anti-CCP sentiments. Multiple organisations in Chongqing formed a coalition in support of the conference, which 8 rallies with over 3,000 participants during 12–27 January. On 10 February 1946, the coalition held a success meeting, which was participated by a number of CCP-affiliated or pro-CCP organisations and was chaired by Zhou Enlai, Guo Moruo, Shen Junru, Luo Longji, Ma Yinchu, Li Gongpu.

== The incident ==
=== CCP description ===
According to CCP's description, the Chongqing branch of KMT started following and threatening those who attended the rallies since 16 January and plotted to disrupt the rallies. On 2 February, the coalition elected 20 plus pro-CCP board members and decided to hold presidential election of the coalition on 10 February. On the morning of 10 February, KMT organised several leaders of pro-KMT associations, who claimed to be the board of the coalition and occupied the meeting chamber before the pro-CCP board members arrived. Zhou Dehou, president of the pro-KMT Chongqing Commercial Chamber, shouted in the chamber, "we elected Liu Deqiao, the representative of the Farming Association representing over 80% of the Chinese population, as the president of the coalition!" and then called the meeting to order. Li Gongpu and Shi Fuliang rushed to the front, trying to stop Zhou, but was beaten by the secret police in disguise of the coalition members. Guo Moruo, Tao Xingzhi, Zhang Naiqi and a number of journalists and trade union members were also beaten. It was not until the arrival of the CPC representatives Zhou Enlai and Mao Ruofei, and the pro-CCP KMT general Feng Yuxiang that the agents left the meeting chamber.

=== KMT description ===
On 10 February, different associations celebrated the success of PCC in Jiaochangkou. Before the meeting, the board of the coalition prepared to elect Li Dequan as the president of the coalition. During the meeting, a number of participants disobey the order of the meeting, advocating Li Gongpu as the president, which led to dissatisfaction among the participants. Tan Qin, the Medical Association Secretary called out loud, "please obey the order of the meeting!" and then asked to elect Liu Deqiao as the president, along with support from several other representatives. When Liu arrived at the front to make his speech, Li tried to stopped Liu from using the microphone, which led to physical fights and chaos in the meeting chamber, where Li Gongpu, Guo Moruo, Shi Fuliang and other board members were beaten by the participants.

== Aftermath ==
=== Open rivalry between CCP and KMT ===
On the following day, Liu Deqiao sued Li Gongpu, Zhang Naiqi, Zhu Xuefan, Tao Xingzhi and Shi Fuliang in the local court for their violation of order and physical damages on others. Yet, in the court debates, the accusation was not successful for Li and others were obviously hurt. On that night, China Democratic League called for an assembly, which appointed Zhou Enlai and Zhang Junmai to complain to Chiang Kai-shek about the incident. However, since Chiang had left for Shanghai, Zhou and Zhang only met KMT Secretary Wu Tiecheng, calling for a thorough investigation. After the incident, the CPC were convinced that peaceful settlements with the Nationalist government was no longer an option. Mao Zedong claimed that Chiang Kai-shek was not interested in forming a coalition government, and therefore the only way for the CPC to survive is to win their revolution "on the battlefield".

=== Murders of Li Gongpu and Wen Yiduo ===
On 11 July 1946, Li Gongpu was murdered by KMT secret agents in Kunming. On 15 July, famous Chinese poet Wen Yiduo, who made an improvised public speech strongly condemning the murder of Li, was also killed soon after his speech in Kunming. The two murders led to United States concerns over the safety and free speech of Chinese scholars under KMT rule and Chinese intellectuals' distrust towards the KMT government.

== See also ==
- Outline of the Chinese Civil War
- New Democracy
