= Miao Yuntai =

Chinese politician

- 缪云台
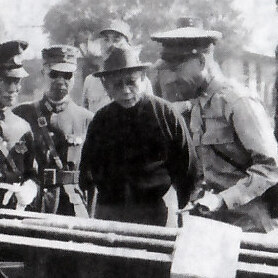
- Born: Miao Jiaming; March 23, 1894; Kunming, Yunnan Province, China
- Died: 3 September 1988 (aged 94)
- Title: Vice Chairperson of the National Committee of the Chinese People's Political Consultative Conference
- Term: 1983-1988

Miao Yuntai (Chinese: 缪云台; March 23, 1894 – September 3, 1988) was a Chinese male politician, who served as the Vice Chairperson of the National Committee of the Chinese People's Political Consultative Conference from 1983 to 1988.

== Early life ==
Miao Yuntai was born Miao Jiaming in Kunming, Yunnan Province, on March 23, 1894. His family owned a shop that sold pickled vegetables and various sauces.

=== Education ===
In 1913, he received a provincial scholarship to attend university in the United States. He first attended Southwestern College in Winfield, Kansas, then went to Illinois University in 1914. In 1915, he transferred to University of Minnesota’s School of Mines. He later changed his field of study and graduated with a bachelor of arts degree in 1918.

== Early Work in Yunnan (1919-1935) ==
Before returning to China, he worked at an iron mine and later a steel company in New York. In 1919, he was hired as a manager at Geiju Tin in Yunnan. Yunnan was primarily an agricultural region at the time, and the provincial government recruited Miao to modernise the tin industry. Miao wrote a study called Outline of the Gejiu Tin Industry in 1919 that identified five major deficiencies in the industry and proposed solutions. He determined that the company suffered from poor management and a lack of modern equipment, and decided to hire American mining experts H. Foster Bain and Marshall D. Draper to help develop the company. Miao also noted in the study that despite the fact that approximately 80% of Gejiu tin was sold in New York or London, the tin's subpar level of purity meant that 16% of its value was lost to the merchants in Hong Kong who re-smelted it. The company's profits were further deteriorated by the export process. Approximately 7,000 tons of tin per year were exported through the Yunnan Railway, which was run by French officials who often levied high taxes and fees. The sea trade was run by Cantonese merchants, who also cut into Geiju Tin's profits. The final deficiency that Miao outlined was the lack of adequate banking facilities in Yunnan. Yunnanese banks lacked exchange services in Hong Kong, and Chinese national banks did not operate in the province. This caused Yunnanese merchants to be reliant on foreign banks, which led to significant losses from exchange rates.

Miao's proposal of how to prevent reliance on outside entities and lost profits from middlemen was made in 1921. He suggested purchasing modern mining machinery, which would increase the level of purity of tin and remove the need for the re-smelting process. He also advocated for creating banking institutions in Yunnan and opening a tin trade office in Hong Kong. He was unable to institute most of these reforms for another decade due to a lack of government stability in Yunnan caused by the Warlord Era. In 1922, Miao was removed from his post due to political conflicts. After this, he worked in the financial industries of Hong Kong and Shanghai.

In 1928, he returned from Hong Kong to Kunming to bury his older brother. Long Yun, the governor of Yunnan, recruited him to direct the province's bank on his arrival. Miao and Long created the Department of Agriculture and Mining and the Yunnan Economic Commission, which managed government shares in state-owned and joint state-private enterprises. Miao became general manager of Geiju Tin in 1930, and founded the Fuidan New Bank the same year. After his return to Geiju Tin, he created the Yunnan Tin Refinery in March 1932. This allowed Yunnanese tin to finally be refined to a level of purity sufficient to be sold directly on the international market. This new refinement process allowed Yunnanese tin to have a higher purity than tin created by Hong Kong smelters. The highest grade of Hong Kong tin had a purity of 99.343%, while the highest grade created by the Yunnan Tin Refinery was 99.87%.

In November 1934, the provincial government decided to reduce its economic dependence on opium. Prohibition of opium started in 1935, and the Yunnan Economic Commission developed several plans to create alternate forms of industrial development. These included planting cotton in former opium fields, constructing a hydro-electric power station and a cement factory, and using funds from the Fuidan New Bank and various government agencies to invest in enterprises throughout the province. The development of the cotton industry was largely abandoned and the plans for the power station and factory only resulted in the creation of a steam plant, but the massive amounts of investment were able to successfully replace government income from opium.

Miao's work in the Yunnan Economic Commission and his leadership of the Fuidan New Bank resulted in him gaining control of almost all financial and industrial activities in Yunnan. He promoted state participation in industrial development as a central facet of his modernising plans for the province, and argued for central planning under the model of state capitalism. He stated "In modern times all nations have attempted to set up planned economies. In Yunnan each provincial ministry has engaged in productive enterprises separately. However, if manpower and financial resources are not concentrated under a single directing organization responsible for planning and its implementation, then there is bound to be not only faulty planning in parts, but also an accumulation of contradictions in putting into effect even well-rounded planning due to lop-sided thinking."

In 1935, Miao adopted a hardline policy to prevent French colonial officials from extracting Yunnanese profits through the Yunnan Railroad and the Banque de l'Indochine. This involved the provincial government enacting stricter control over exports and banking, and was met with resistance by French officials. In response the Governor-General of Hanoi was told to obstruct Yunnanese imports and exports during the customs process, and Geiju Tin miners were threatened and offered bribes to collaborate with the French. Miao planned to use livestock to transfer tin to avoid French sabotage, but was able to leverage competition between the railway and the Banque de l'Indochine in order to ensure Yunnanese exports would continue to be transported and gain intelligence on the Banque de l'Indochine. After a year, the Yunnanese government was able to gain economic independence from the French sphere of influence.

== Second Sino-Japanese War ==
During the Second Sino-Japanese War, Miao adjusted the Yunnan Economic Commission's investment policy to benefit the war effort and take advantage of the large numbers of people moving to Southern China due to the war. At this time the Economic Commission invested in an electric steel plant to manufacture war materials, used the Yunnan Alcohol Plant to create transportation fuel, and used Yunnanese concrete to construct wartime infrastructure in Kunming. The mass migration to the region resulted in a housing shortage, and the Economic Commission built a residential community called Zhuantang New Village that contained apartments, schools, and recreational facilities.

Miao, acting as a representative of the Yunnan provincial government, helped to negotiate the construction of the Burma Road in 1937. This road would link Burma (now known as Myanmar) and Yunnan, and act as a strategic channel to bring wartime aid into China. Miao also negotiated with France to bring supplies through the Yunnan Railway, and arranged reception for American forces entering Yunnan.

== Chinese Civil War ==
Before the Second Sino-Japanese War, Yunnan stayed largely independent from the Nationalist government. Due to the strategic importance of the region during the war, the central government slowly began to establish and expand enterprises in Yunnan, strengthening the economy but eroding local independence. Long Yun proposed the creation of the People's Enterprise Company to keep control of the Yunnanese economy in the hands of the provincial government, but Chang Kai-Shek prevented this by ordering Du Yuming to depose him from his position as governor in an October 1945 coup.

The People's Enterprise Company was revived by Long Yun's successor Lu Han in December 1945, with Miao serving on the committee to prepare for its establishment. The Yunnan People's Enterprise Company was officially created in May 1947, merging the Yunnan Economic Commission, Fudian New Bank, and 85 affiliated enterprises into a single entity. Miao served as general manager until it was nationalised by the Chinese Communist Party.

Miao participated in the 1946 Political Consultative Conference as a representative of capitalist interests in the Southwest. In 1947 he served as a member of both the Executive Yuan and Legislative Yuan, a representative to the National Assembly, and chairman of the Committee for the Handling of American Aid and Relief Materials. He was invited to the 1st National Committee of the Chinese People's Political Consultative Conference (CPPCC) by Zhou Enlai in 1949, but was unable to attend due to his wife needing medical treatment in Japan.

== Return to China and Death (1979-1988) ==
Miao moved to Hong Kong in 1949, and went to the United States the following year. He became a citizen of the United States in 1955, but renounced it in 1979 when he moved back to China.

After his return, he served in the Standing Committee of the Fifth National People's Congress and the Standing Committee of the Fifth CPPCC. From 1983 to 1988, he served as Vice Chairperson of the Sixth CPPCC. During this time he also served as a special advisor to the Ministry of Foreign Economic Relations and Trade and was a member of the board of directors for the state-owned investment company CITIC Group.

Miao passed away in Beijing on September 3, 1988, at the age of 94. His memorial service was attended by over 500 people, including Zhao Ziyang, Li Peng, Deng Yingchao, and Li Xiannian. His ashes were placed in Babaoshan Revolutionary Cemetery.

His autobiography The Memoirs of Miao Yuntai was published in 1991 by Chinese Literature and History Press.
