= May 1st slogans =

Chinese Communist Party slogans

The May 1st slogans were a group of 23 political slogans issued by the Central Committee of the Chinese Communist Party (CCP) on May 1, 1948, International Labor Day. They laid the foundation for the establishment of the Chinese People's Political Consultative Conference and what the CCP terms the "multi-party cooperation and political consultation system" under its leadership.

== Background ==
After their victory in the Second Sino-Japanese War in 1945, the Kuomintang and the Chinese Communist Party negotiated in Chongqing and signed the Minutes of the Talks between the Government and the Chinese Communist Party on October 10, agreeing to "build a new China that is independent, free and prosperous, based on peace, democracy, unity and solidarity,... long-term cooperation, resolutely avoid civil war and build an independent, free and prosperous new China." "Convene the Political Consultative Conference." On January 10, 1946, the Political Consultative Conference was held in Chongqing. The meeting passed the "Agreement on the Organization of the Government", "Agreement on the National Assembly", "Agreement on the Draft Constitution" and "Agreement on the Military". Among them, the "Program for Peaceful National Construction" stipulated that all political parties in the country "unite to build a unified, free and democratic new China".

In June 1946, Chiang Kai-shek dispatched 300,000 troops to attack the Central Plains Liberated Area. From July to September 1946, he also sent troops to attack the Jiangsu-Anhui Border Area, the Shandong Liberated Area, the Shanxi-Hebei-Shandong-Henan Border Area, the Shanxi-Chahar-Hebei Border Area, and the Shanxi-Suiyuan Border Area. In response to the Kuomintang's military offensive, Mao Zedong pointed out in his article "Smash Chiang Kai-shek's Offensive with a War of Self-Defense" that "[a]ll comrades in the Party and the military and civilians in the Liberated Areas must unite to thoroughly smash Chiang Kai-shek's offensive and establish an independent, peaceful, and democratic new China."

By June 1947, the army led by the Chinese Communist Party had killed 1.12 million Kuomintang troops. In October 1947, Mao Zedong drafted the Declaration of the Chinese People's Liberation Army for the Chinese People's Liberation Army headquarters in Shenquanbao, Jiaxian County, Shaanxi Province. He analyzed the domestic situation, put forward the slogan of "overthrowing Chiang Kai-shek and liberating all of China", and announced that the basic political program of the Chinese People's Liberation Army and the Chinese Communist Party was to "unite the workers, peasants, soldiers, students, businessmen, all oppressed classes, people's organizations, democratic parties, ethnic minorities, overseas Chinese and other patriots to form a national united front, overthrow Chiang Kai-shek's dictatorship and establish a democratic coalition government."

From December 25 to 28, 1947, the Central Committee of the Chinese Communist Party held a meeting in Yangjiagou, Mizhi County, Shaanxi Province (known as the "December Meeting" in history). Mao Zedong delivered a report entitled "The Current Situation and Our Tasks" at the meeting, reaffirming the basic political program of the Chinese Communist Party.

In the first half of 1948, the Chinese People's Liberation Army won successive strategic offensives, the land reform movement in the liberated areas was carried out in depth, and the democratic movement in the Kuomintang-controlled areas continued to develop. On April 1, 1948, Mao Zedong pointed out in his "Speech at the Shanxi-Suiyuan Cadres Conference": "All party comrades must firmly grasp the party's general line, which is the line of the new democratic revolution." "This revolution cannot be led by any other class or any other political party. It can only and must be led by the proletariat and the Chinese Communist Party." The state and government established by the "masses of the people is the People's Republic of China and the democratic coalition government of the alliance of democratic classes led by the proletariat".

== History ==
In mid-March 1948, the CCP Central Committee held a meeting in Yangjiagou, Mizhi County, Shaanxi Province. The meeting decided to move the CCP Central Committee to Hebei Province to lead the Second Civil War between the Kuomintang and the Communist Party. On April 11, 1948, Mao Zedong, Zhou Enlai, Ren Bishi and other leaders led the CCP Central Committee to the Jin-Cha- Ji Military Region Headquarters in Chengnanzhuang, Fuping County, Hebei Province via the Jinsui Border Region. On April 23, Zhou Enlai, Ren Bishi and others arrived in Xibaipo, Pingshan County, Hebei Province. On May 26, Mao Zedong left Chengnanzhuang for Xibaipo. During his stay in Chengnan Village, Mao Zedong was very concerned about land reform and party rectification. He entrusted Ren Bishi to convene a symposium on land reform attended by village cadres in the area, as well as a report meeting on land reform and party rectification attended by the secretaries of the CCP Quyang County, Fuping County, Ding County and some district party committees. Mao Zedong personally attended the meeting.

On the eve of May 1, 1948, International Labor Day, Mao Zedong considered that the Kuomintang government was about to collapse and that the people of the whole country needed to work together to build a new China, so he decided to express his intention by issuing slogans. Mao Zedong drafted the "May 1 slogan" on behalf of the CCP Central Committee, and then first sought the opinions of other leaders in Chengnanzhuang. After that, he personally called Zhou Enlai in Xibaipo to seek the opinions of other leaders of the CCP Central Committee. Zhou Enlai replied that he fully agreed with Mao Zedong's opinion.

On the eve of May 1, 1948, Liao Chengzhi, president of the Xinhua News Agency, asked the Central Committee of the Chinese Communist Party whether it had any important news to announce on May 1, International Labor Day. The telegram was quickly passed to Zhou Enlai, secretary of the Secretariat of the Central Committee of the Chinese Communist Party in Xibaipo. The Secretariat put forward the first draft of the "May 1 slogan".

Article 5 of the first draft reads: "The working class is the leader of the Chinese people's revolution. The working class in the liberated areas is the master of the new China. They should act more actively and achieve the final victory of the Chinese revolution sooner." Mao Zedong revised Article 5 of the first draft to: "All democratic parties, people's organizations and social elites should quickly convene a political consultative conference to discuss and implement the convening of the People's Congress and the establishment of a democratic coalition government." This revision is of great significance. The first draft emphasized that the working class is the master of the new China, which means the proletarian dictatorship of the socialist country in the future. The content revised by Mao Zedong emphasized the establishment of a democratic coalition government, which is more conducive to uniting democratic parties and various forces. The revision of Article 5 had a profound impact on China's subsequent political and historical development.

On April 30, 1948, the enlarged meeting of the CCP Central Committee Secretariat (also known as the Chengnanzhuang Meeting) was held in Chengnanzhuang, Fuping County, Hebei Province, where the Jin-Cha-Ji Military Region was located. The meeting discussed and adopted the CCP Central Committee's slogan for commemorating May 1st Labor Day, which had been revised by Mao Zedong. The slogan was released to the public on the same day by the Xinhua News Agency in northern Shaanxi and broadcast by Xinhua Radio. On May 1, 1948, the front-page headline of the Jin-Cha-Ji Daily read "The Central Committee of the Chinese Communist Party Releases the Slogan for May 1st Labor Day", with Mao Zedong's profile portrait printed above the article. On May 2, 1948, the front-page headline of the People's Daily read "The CCP Central Committee Releases the Slogan for Commemorating May 1st Labor Day".

On May 1, 1948, the first session of the First National Assembly closed in Nanjing, and President Chiang Kai-shek and Vice President Li Zongren were sworn in.

On May 1, 1948, Mao Zedong wrote to Li Jishen, Chairman of the Revolutionary Committee of the Kuomintang, and Shen Junru, Standing Committee Member of the Central Committee of the China Democratic League, to discuss and propose the time, place, participating parties, principles, and implementation steps for the Political Consultative Conference, and to provide additional explanations for the fifth point of the "May 1st slogan".

== Content ==
The Central Committee of the Chinese Communist Party issued a slogan to commemorate May 1st Labor Day. The full text is as follows:

- 1. This year's May Day is the day when the Chinese people march toward national victory. Salute to all the officers and men of the Chinese People's Liberation Army, the liberators of the Chinese people! Celebrate the great victory of the various armies of the People's Liberation Army!
- (II) This year's May Day is the day when Chiang Kai-shek, the mortal enemy of the Chinese people, will perish. Chiang Kai-shek's role as a fake president is a sign that he will soon be guillotined. Fight to Nanjing and capture the fake president Chiang Kai-shek alive!
- 3. This year's May Day is a day when the consciousness of the Chinese working people and all oppressed people has reached an unprecedented maturity. Celebrate the unity of the working class in all liberated areas and throughout the country! Celebrate the victory and development of the land reform work of the peasants in all liberated areas and throughout the country! Celebrate the progress of the freedom movement of the youth and intellectuals throughout the country!
- 4. The working people of the whole country should unite and join forces with the intellectuals, the liberal bourgeoisie, the democratic parties, social elites and other patriots to consolidate and expand the united front against imperialism, feudalism and bureaucratic capitalism and work together to overthrow Chiang Kai-shek and establish a new China.
- 5. All democratic parties, people's organizations, and social elites should quickly convene a political consultative conference to discuss and implement the convening of a National People's Congress and the establishment of a democratic coalition government!
- 6. Everything is for the victory of the front. Workers in the liberated areas, bring more and better guns, ammunition and other military supplies to the front! Rear-line staff in the liberated areas, better organize and support the work of the front!
- 7. Salute to the workers in the Liberated Areas who have worked hard to produce munitions! Salute to the workers in the Liberated Areas who have worked hard to restore industry, mining and transportation! Salute to the engineers and technicians in the Liberated Areas who have worked hard to improve technology! Salute to all the personnel in the Liberated Areas who have worked hard in the rear service and rear office work! Salute to the labor heroes, people's meritorious service personnel and model workers in all industrial departments and rear service departments in the Liberated Areas!
- 8. The workers and economic personnel in the liberated areas must unswervingly implement the labor movement and industrial policies that develop production, prosper the economy, balance public and private interests, and benefit both labor and capital!
- 9. Workers in the liberated areas should strive to increase the output of industrial products, improve the quality of industrial products, and reduce the cost of industrial products! Supply the market with more and better necessities for the people!
- 10. Workers and staff in the liberated areas should develop a new attitude towards work, take good care of tools, save raw materials, observe labor discipline, oppose all laziness, waste and sabotage, learn technology and improve production efficiency!
- 11. Workers in the liberated areas should strengthen the internal unity of the working class, strengthen the unity between workers and technicians, and establish a master-apprentice relationship of respecting teachers and loving apprentices!
- 12. Employees in private enterprises in the liberated areas should establish a reasonable relationship with capitalists that is beneficial to both labor and capital, and work hard to jointly develop the national economy!
- 13. Trade unions in liberated areas shall cooperate with the democratic government to ensure an adequate standard of living for workers, organize welfare programs for workers, and overcome their difficulties in life.
- 14. The workers in the liberated areas and the areas under Chiang Kai-shek's control should unite to establish a unified organization of workers throughout the country and fight for the liberation of the working class throughout the country!
- 15. Salute the workers in the Chiang Kai-shek-controlled areas who have fought bravely for survival and freedom! Welcome the workers in the Chiang Kai-shek-controlled areas to come to the liberated areas to participate in industrial construction!
- 16. Employees in Chiang Kai-shek's controlled areas should assist the People's Liberation Army with their actions and not manufacture or transport military supplies for Chiang Kai-shek's bandits! When the People's Liberation Army occupies a city, they should maintain order in the city, protect public and private enterprises, and not allow Chiang Kai-shek's bandits to destroy them!
- 17. Workers in Chiang Kai-shek's areas should unite with the oppressed national industrialists and businessmen to overthrow the rule of the bureaucratic capitalists and oppose the aggression of the U.S. imperialists!
- 18. The working class and people of the whole country must unite to oppose the U.S. imperialists' interference in China's internal affairs and violation of China's sovereignty, and oppose the U.S. imperialists' support for the revival of Japan's aggressive forces!
- 19. The Chinese working class and the working classes of all countries unite to oppose the U.S. imperialists' oppression of the national liberation movements, democratic movements and workers' movements in Asia, Europe and America!
- 20. Salute to the working class of all countries in the world who have assisted the Chinese people in their war of liberation and promoted the Chinese workers' movement! Salute to the working class of all countries who have refused to transport or unload materials aided by U.S. imperialism and other imperialists! Salute to the working class and people of all countries who have stood shoulder to shoulder against the aggression of U.S. imperialism!
- 21. Long live the unity of the Chinese working people and all oppressed people!
- 22. Long live the victory of the Chinese People's Liberation War!
- 23. Long live the liberation of the Chinese nation!

== Response ==
At that time, the Shanghai Bureau of the CCP Central Committee also managed the Hong Kong Branch of the CCP Central Committee, and Fang Fang was the secretary of the Hong Kong Branch. Pan Hannian, a member of the Shanghai Bureau of the CCP Central Committee, went to Hong Kong on the orders of Zhou Enlai and cooperated with Fang Fang to establish the United Front Work Committee of the Hong Kong Branch of the CCP Central Committee, with Lian Guan as the secretary. After Pan Hannian received the telegram of the "May 1st slogan", he immediately published it in the Huashang Daily sponsored by the CCP in Hong Kong. As a result, the "May 1st slogan" had a great influence at home and abroad and among various democratic parties and democratic figures.

After the "May 1st slogan" was released, China's various democratic parties, people's organizations, democratic personages from all walks of life, domestic ethnic minorities, and overseas Chinese responded one after another.

On May 4, 1948, Tan Kah Kee, on behalf of the overseas Chinese in Singapore, sent a telegram to Mao Zedong, echoing the "May 1st slogan" and expressing the hope that a new Political Consultative Conference would be convened as soon as possible to establish a democratic coalition government.

Prior to this, the United Front Work Committee of the Hong Kong Branch of the CCP Central Committee had proposed to the democratic parties that had their headquarters or representative offices in Hong Kong to hold a "biweekly symposium" to jointly analyze the current situation in the mainland. The biweekly symposium was hosted by each party in turn, and was often held one week at the home of Lian Guan on the fourth floor of No. 4 Tin Hau Temple Road, and the next week at the home of Li Jishen at No. 92 Robinson Road. After the democratic parties saw the "May 1st slogan", the biweekly symposium became a multi-day discussion. After two consecutive days of speeches, the twelve democratic party leaders and non-partisan democrats who attended the meeting, on behalf of various parties and sectors, jointly issued a telegram on May 5, 1948, in response to the "May 1st slogan." The full text is as follows:

Mr. Mao Zedong of the Chinese Communist Party, and to all compatriots in the liberated areas:

The Nanjing dictator has stolen power and sold out the country, which is unprecedented in history. Recently, he has colluded with American imperialism to deceive the world by pretending to be democratic. Although the people cannot be deceived, the reputation and power cannot be used as a pretext. At this time, wherever the liberation troops go, food and drink will gather on the road; the country will be restored, and the major plan should be decided as soon as possible. I have considered the situation at home and abroad and am about to make a proposal. I read the fifth item of your party's May 1st slogan: "All democratic parties, people's organizations and social elites should quickly convene a political consultative conference to discuss and realize the convening of a people's congress and the establishment of a democratic coalition government." It is in line with the people's current requirements and is in line with the original intention of my colleagues. How can I not be more respectful? In addition to sending a telegram to all walks of life at home and abroad and overseas compatriots to jointly promote and complete the great cause, I hereby send it to you and hope for your advice.

Li Jishen and He Xiangning (Revolutionary Committee of the Kuomintang), Shen Junru and Zhang Bojun (China Democratic League), Ma Xulun and Wang Shaoao (China Democratic League), Chen Qiyou (China Zhi Gong Party), Peng Zemin (China Peasants and Workers Democratic Party), Li Zhangda (China People's National Salvation Association), Cai Tingkai (China Democratic League), Tan Pingshan (Three Principles of the People Comrades Association), and Guo Moruo (non-partisan).

The signatures in the above-mentioned joint telegram to Mao Zedong were as follows:

- Li Jishen and He Xiangning of the Revolutionary Committee of the Chinese Kuomintang (RCCK);
- Shen Junru and Zhang Bojun of the China Democratic League (CDL);
- Ma Xulun and Wang Shaoao of the China Association for Promoting Democracy (CADP);
- Chen Qiyou of the China Zhi Gong Party (CZGP);
- Peng Zemin of the Chinese Peasants' and Workers' Democratic Party (CPWDP);
- Li Zhangda of the Chinese People's National Salvation Association (CNSA);
- Tsai Ting-kai of the Democratic Progressive Party of the Chinese Kuomintang;
- Tan Pingshan of the Three Principles of the People Comrades Association;
- Non-partisan Guo Moruo.

On the same day, they also jointly sent a telegram to domestic and foreign newspapers, organizations and compatriots across the country, openly responding to the "May 1st slogan".

On May 7, 1948, the Taiwan Democratic Self-Government League issued a statement in response to the "May 1st Call", stating that the "May 1st Call" "is in line with the current demands of the people of the whole country and the wishes of all the people of Taiwan." The statement called on Taiwan compatriots to "quickly respond to and support the call of the CCP Central Committee".

On May 8, 1948, various democratic parties and non-partisan democrats in Hong Kong held a series of symposiums entitled "The Current New Situation and the New CPPCC". Guo Moruo, Zhang Naiqi and more than a dozen others gave speeches, arguing that the "May 1 slogan" was of great significance in uniting various political parties, mobilizing the people's democratic forces and promoting the victory of the revolution.

At that time, the Democratic National Construction Association and leaders such as Huang Yanpei were still persisting in the underground struggle in Shanghai. On May 14, 1948, Sheng Kangnian arrived in Shanghai from Hong Kong with a letter from Shen Junru to Zhang Lan and Huang Yanpei, introducing the situation of the democratic parties in Hong Kong responding to the "May 1st slogan". On May 23, the Democratic National Construction Association secretly held a joint meeting of executive directors and supervisors in Shanghai under white terror, and unanimously passed a resolution to "agree with the CCP's 'May 1st' call, prepare to open a new CPPCC, and establish a coalition government. Zhang Naiqi and Sun Qimeng were recommended as representatives in Hong Kong, and they should maintain contact with the leaders of the CCP and other democratic parties in Hong Kong."

In May 1948, the China Democratic League (May 24), the Three People's Principles Comrades Association, and the Chinese Kuomintang Democratic League each issued a declaration in response to the "May 1st slogan".

In June 1948, 232 women from the Hong Kong women's community, including He Xiangning and Yang Meizhen, jointly issued a statement in response to the "May 1st slogan". On June 4, 1948, 125 people from all walks of life in Hong Kong, including Liu Yazi, Mao Dun, and Zhang Naiqi, jointly issued a statement in response to the "May 1st slogan". On June 9, 1948, the China Zhi Gong Party issued a statement in response to the "May 1st slogan". On June 14, the China Democratic League issued a "Letter to All Democratic Parties, People's Organizations, Newspapers and Compatriots Nationwide" in response to the "May 1st slogan". On June 25, the Revolutionary Committee of the Kuomintang issued a statement in response to the "May 1st slogan". On July 7, the Chinese People's National Salvation Association issued the "July 7 Declaration".

The democratic parties and non-party personages responded enthusiastically to the CCP Central Committee's "May 1st slogan" and openly endorsed the CCP Central Committee's call to convene a new political consultative conference and establish a democratic coalition government, indicating that the democratic parties had since abandoned their past "middle line" of "neither rightist nor leftist" and chose the position of unity and cooperation with the CCP. As a result, the political situation of the domestic parties in China has changed significantly. Most democratic parties and non-party democratic personages openly stood on the side of the CCP and jointly opposed the rule of the Kuomintang.

After that, many representatives of democratic parties and non-party democratic figures responded to the call of the CCP Central Committee and arrived in the liberated areas. In 1949, the Preparatory Committee of the New Political Consultative Conference was established in Beijing. In September 1949, the First Plenary Session of the Chinese People's Political Consultative Conference was held in Beijing, and the People's Republic of China was established.

== Influence ==
When responding to the "May 1st slogan", the self-ranking and response order of some democratic parties became an important basis for determining the ranking of the eight democratic parties in the People's Republic of China. Later, after the preparatory meeting of the New Political Consultative Conference, the first plenary session of the Chinese People's Political Consultative Conference, and the organizational adjustments of the democratic parties, the final ranking of the eight democratic parties was formed as follows: the Revolutionary Committee of the Chinese Kuomintang, the China Democratic League, the China Democratic National Construction Association, the China Democratic Progressive Party, the China Peasants and Workers Democratic Party, the China Zhi Gong Party, the Jiusan Society, and the Taiwan Democratic Self-Government League.

On June 16, 1949, the first plenary session of the Preparatory Committee of the New Political Consultative Conference adopted the "Organizational Regulations of the Preparatory Committee of the New Political Consultative Conference", Article 1 of which stipulated: "... Based on the above principles, the Preparatory Committee of the New Political Consultative Conference shall be composed of the original proposer of the New Political Consultative Conference, the Chinese Communist Party, and the following 23 units that support the fifth item of the CCP's "May 1" slogan in 1948, including the democratic parties, people's organizations and non-party democratic personages." The basis for the establishment of the Preparatory Committee of the New Political Consultative Conference was the fifth item of the "May 1" slogan. On September 29, 1949, the first plenary session of the Chinese People's Political Consultative Conference adopted the Common Program, which continued the spirit of the "May 1" slogan. The "May 1" slogan laid the foundation for the establishment of the People's Republic of China and the multi-party cooperation and political consultation system led by the Chinese Communist Party.
