= Double Tenth Agreement =

1945 peace treaty between the Communists and Nationalists during the Chinese Civil War

Summary of Conversations Between the Government and Representatives of the Communist Party of China
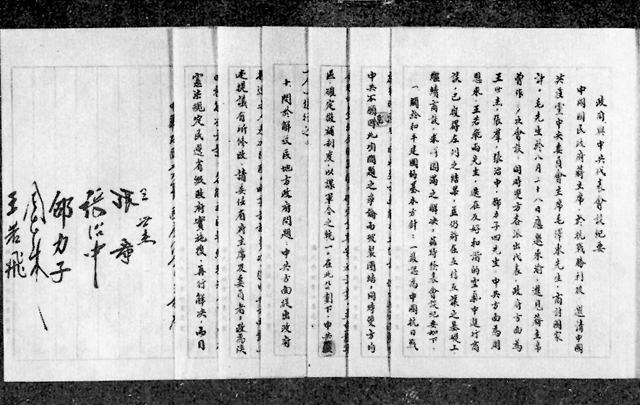
- A copy of the original agreement published in the Jiefang Daily
- Type: Peace treaty
- Context: Chinese Civil War
- Signed: October 10, 1945
- Location: Red Rock Village Museum, Chongqing, China
- Mediators: Patrick J. Hurley; Apollon Petrov
- Negotiators: Chiang Kai-shek; Wang Shijie; Mao Zedong; Zhou Enlai
- Parties: Republic of China; Chinese Communist Party
- Language: Chinese

Full text
- zh:雙十協定 at Wikisource

Double Tenth Agreement
- Traditional Chinese: 雙十協定
- Simplified Chinese: 双十协定
Transcriptions
Standard Mandarin
- Hanyu Pinyin: Shuāngshí Xiédìng
- Wade–Giles: Shuang^{1}-shih^{2} Hsieh^{2}-ting^{4}

Summary of Conversations Between the Government and Representatives of the Communist Party of China
- Traditional Chinese: 政府與中共代表會談紀要
- Simplified Chinese: 政府与中共代表会谈纪要
Transcriptions
Standard Mandarin
- Hanyu Pinyin: Zhèngfŭ yŭ Zhōnggòng Dàibiăo Huìtán Jìyào

The Double Tenth Agreement, formally known as the Summary of Conversations Between the Government and Representatives of the Communist Party of China, was a pact between the Kuomintang-ruled Nationalist government (KMT) and the Chinese Communist Party (CCP). The agreement was concluded on 10 October 1945, the Double Ten Day of the Republic of China (ROC), following 43 days of talks known as the Chongqing Negotiations (Chinese: 重慶談判).

Held in Chongqing, China, from 29 August to 10 October 1945, the negotiations were highlighted by a meeting between CCP Chairman Mao Zedong and KMT Chairman Chiang Kai-shek, marking the first time the two leaders had met in 20 years. It would also be their final meeting. Mao and United States Ambassador to China Patrick J. Hurley had flown together to Chongqing on 27 August to initiate the talks, though most of the subsequent negotiations were undertaken by Wang Shijie and Zhou Enlai, representing the KMT and the CCP, respectively.

The outcome of the agreement was that the CCP acknowledged the KMT as the legitimate government, while the KMT in return recognized the CCP as a legitimate opposition party. Additionally, the Shangdang Campaign, an ongoing military conflict that had begun on 10 September, came to an end on 12 October as a result of the agreement's announcement. The document was formally signed at what is now the Red Rock Village Museum in Chongqing.

== Background ==
=== Historical hostilities ===
After the end of the First United Front in 1927, the Nationalist government launched several purges of Communists within the Kuomintang. The CCP responded to these purges with several uprisings against the Nationalist government. Chiang then retaliated with the Encirclement Campaigns aimed to search and destroy the Chinese Red Army across China throughout the first half of the 1930s. The two sides came to a ceasefire after the Xi'an Incident in December 1936, where the Nationalists and the Communists agreed to form a united front once again to counter Japanese military aggression.

=== Post-war climate ===
At the time of the Double Tenth Agreement, China had just concluded the Second Sino-Japanese War, an eight-year war that resulted in a Chinese coalition victory. Poor relations between the KMT and CCP during the war was soon exacerbated due to the loss of a shared goal both parties held; the defeat of the Japanese troops in China. The CCP quickly denounced the KMT as a reactionary clique and had plans for the removal of KMT hegemony in China, which included Soviet support.

However, a strengthening of Soviet relations with the KMT after the war with the Sino-Soviet Treaty of Friendship and Alliance, signed on 14 August 1945, resulted in a reversal of Soviet foreign policy in China. A part of the treaty was the Soviet Union recognizing the Nationalists (KMT) as the legitimate government of China. This and Soviet pressure on the CCP to begin negotiation with the KMT and Soviet wishes to foster positive relations and maintain peace between the two political parties led to the CCP accepting the invitations from the KMT for talks. The CCP initially was not interested in negotiating with the KMT at all, but several secret telegrams from Stalin to Mao urging him to accept Chiang's calls for talks resulted in the acceptance of Chiang's invitation for negotiations in Chongqing. However, Chiang initially did not want to negotiate with the CCP and wished to defeat the CCP before they became a larger threat. It was only due to US pressure for peace talks between the two parties that the KMT decided to begin negotiation with the CCP.

=== Differing party objectives ===
Each party had different purposes for negotiating with the opposing side. The KMT, led by Chiang, wished for the unification of the military and government administration underneath the KMT with the CCP as an opposition party. Chiang primarily wished for both political and military unity underneath the KMT, however this would never be accepted by the CCP so he changed his goals a little to unity initially underneath the KMT, with the transition of China into a democratic government allowing the CCP to gain power. Chiang also wanted the CCP to "refrain from independent actions" and to assume control over the CCP controlled regions in northern China.

Mao's aim in the negotiations was less about achieving peace between the two sides and more about creating conditions that would support a future revolution. Mao placed great importance on the division of land between the KMT and CCP, desiring a north–south split in the Chinese region between the two parties. The CCP also placed great importance on the occupation of Manchuria. They saw the future control of Manchuria as a "guarantee that peace in the Far East will be preserved". The CCP also believed that the revolution would be impacted by the capture or loss of Manchuria, with each outcome either speeding up or postponing the revolution by a few years. Mao also knew that the KMT would not be in the position to start a civil war and so used the negotiations as a way to "mobilize the masses, to win over the puppet troops, to publish newspapers [and] to develop our secret service".

== Negotiations ==
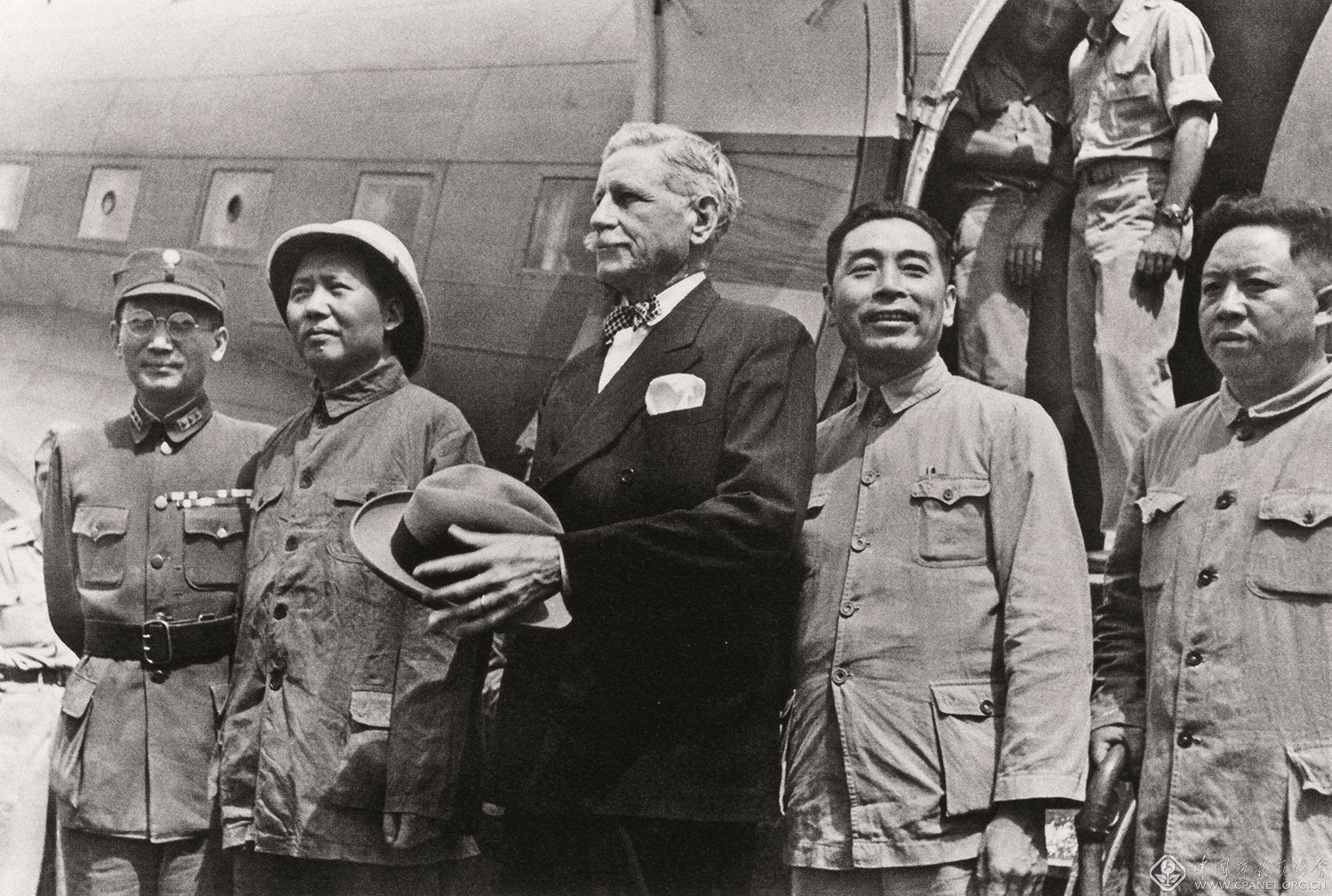
Before the departure from Yan'an. From left: Zhang Zhizhong, Mao Zedong, Patrick J. Hurley, Zhou Enlai, Wang Ruofei

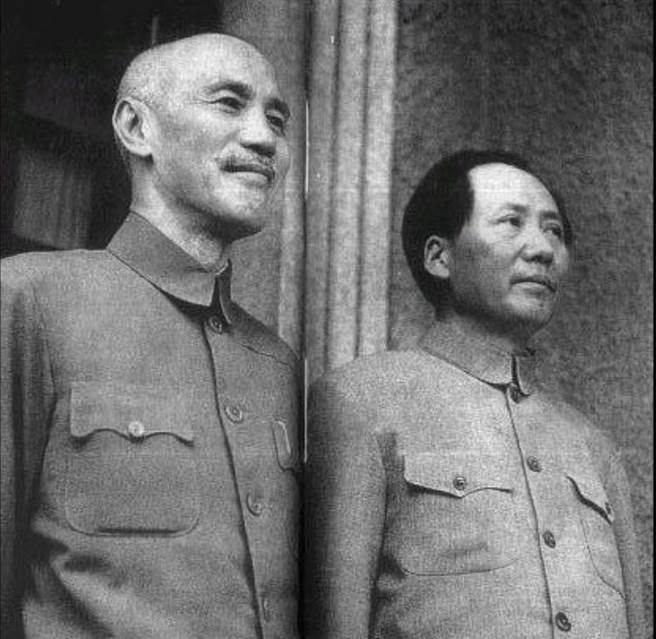
Chiang Kai-shek and Mao Zedong in Chongqing, 1945

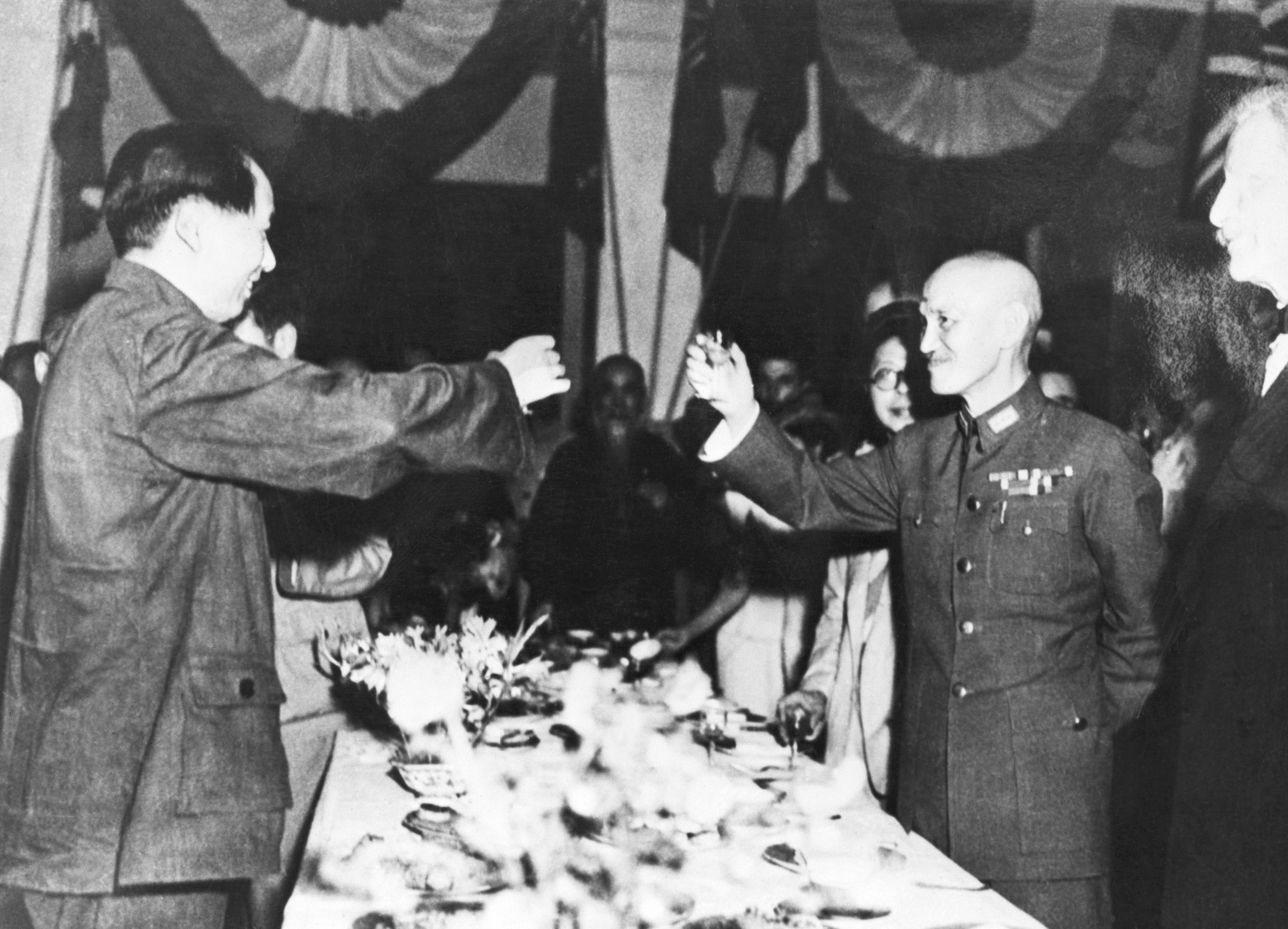
Mao Zedong and Chiang Kai-shek during the Chongqing negotiations

Chiang Kai-shek, the leader of the KMT party, had been sending invitations for the CCP to join Chiang in Chongqing to initiate conversations between the two major parties after the Japanese surrender on 14 August 1945. In August 1945, Mao and Zhou flew from Yan'an to the Chinese wartime capital of Chongqing to discuss the relationship between the CCP and the KMT in the aftermath of the Second Sino-Japanese War. Mao Zedong, after being pressured by the Soviets, finally accepted and arrived in Chongqing with the U.S. Ambassador Patrick J. Hurley and Zhang Zhizhong in late August. Accompanied by American ambassador Patrick J. Hurley, Mao joined Chiang for dinner on 27 August.

The talks ran over a course of 41 days starting from 28 August 1945 and concluded with the signing of the Double Tenth Agreement on 10 October 1945. During the negotiations, CCP military operations were increased with Mao ordering the CCP troops in Shandong and Central China to attack 40-50 thousand KMT troops in each region. Throughout the negotiations, armed struggles between the two parties continued to escalate as the CCP were under attack both north and south of the Yangtze. This string of battles between the CCP and KMT, known as the Shangdang Campaign, began on 10 September and concluded on 12 October. This was done to put Mao and the CCP in a greater position of power during the talks and also to emphasize the goals that Mao had in mind for the negotiations. The battles resulted in a victory for Mao and the CCP which skewed the negotiations to Mao's favor.

The CCP did initially make some concessions to the KMT during the talks, however none of them came to fruition. Some examples of the concessions initially made was a reduction of the CCP military to 20 divisions and the withdrawal of troops from a few southern CCP-occupied provinces. The reduction of the CCP military to 20 divisions was not an issue for Mao however, as to maintain the current military, Mao planned to increase the size of each division, resulting in no actual reduction of the military.

By the end of the negotiations, the two parties managed to reach agreements on certain issues. After seven weeks of negotiations, the two sides agreed on the common goal to eventually establish a political democracy in China, and to place all Chinese armed forces under the command of Chiang. The CCP recognized the legitimacy of the KMT's governance over China, along with the democratization of the political parties, the formation of a national assembly, and the nationalization of troops.

== Terms ==
On 10 October 1945, the Double Tenth Agreement was signed by the KMT and CCP in Chongqing. A joint statement was issued by the CCP and the KMT to outline the result of the negotiations, which is now known as the Double Tenth Agreement. In this agreement, the CCP and the KMT mutually recognized each other, as the two parties planned to form a coalition government. The aim of the agreement was to avoid another civil war. The conditions agreed upon by the KMT and CCP are as follows:

1. The CCP would recognize the KMT as the legitimate ruling party of China.
2. The legalization and ensured equality of all political parties within China
3. KMT and CCP acceptance of a joint peaceful state building of China, making efforts to prevent civil war at the same time
4. The formation of a political consultative conference to discuss plans for state building with guaranteed representation of all political parties
5. The abolition of CCP and KMT secret services
6. Holding a general election to determine the next ruling party of China
7. Putting an end to political tutelage within China, a phase that ensured one-party rule under the KMT, giving them the rights to govern China autocratically

== Aftermath ==
Mao returned to Yan'an on 11 October. After the signing of the treaty, relations quickly declined between the KMT and CCP. The Nationalist government was unwilling to recognize the areas under control by the CCP. Chiang was unconvinced by the joint statement, and came to realize that a military solution was necessary. In private conversations with Mao, it is evident that he did not see the talks as a way for peace between the CCP and KMT. Mao states "Our policy was set long ago – to give tit for tat, to fight for every inch of land". Mao described the statement as "a mere scrap of paper", and expressed to the Soviet Union that the civil war was "virtually inevitable". Mao was unwilling to abandon his revolutionary goals which implied to the KMT that the CCP would not lay down their arms and become a party opposition in a democratic coalition.

There is also evidence of Chiang not viewing the talks earnestly. Chiang used the talks as a way to reduce international pressure on the KMT party as well as a stalling tactic to help assist his primary goal of eliminating the CCP. A secret telegram sent on 29 September by Chiang to various commanders-in-chief stated "The purpose of the current negotiation with the Communist Party is to find out its demands and purposes and to reduce international pressure on us". Later onwards in the telegram Chiang orders his commanders to occupy the major cities in the previously occupied Japanese zones. The military advantage gained over the CCP through doing this would then be used to make the CCP submit to the KMT. If the CCP refused to submit to the military rule of the KMT, then they would be eliminated "as bandits".

The treaty between the CCP and KMT ultimately failed. Neither side wished to compromise with each other as it would result in a future where their respective party could not gain complete control over China. The KMT would not agree to a treaty in which they would have to give up many of their advantages held over the CCP and the CCP did not desire to be in a position within the new government in which they could not gain complete power. By November 1945, it was clear that the agreement was going to be short-lived, and the full-scale civil war soon resumed in 1946. As well as years of poor relations between the two parties, and a general mistrust of each side, the Double Tenth Agreement resulted in failure and by 1946, civil war between the CCP and KMT had erupted again.

== International intervention ==
=== United States ===
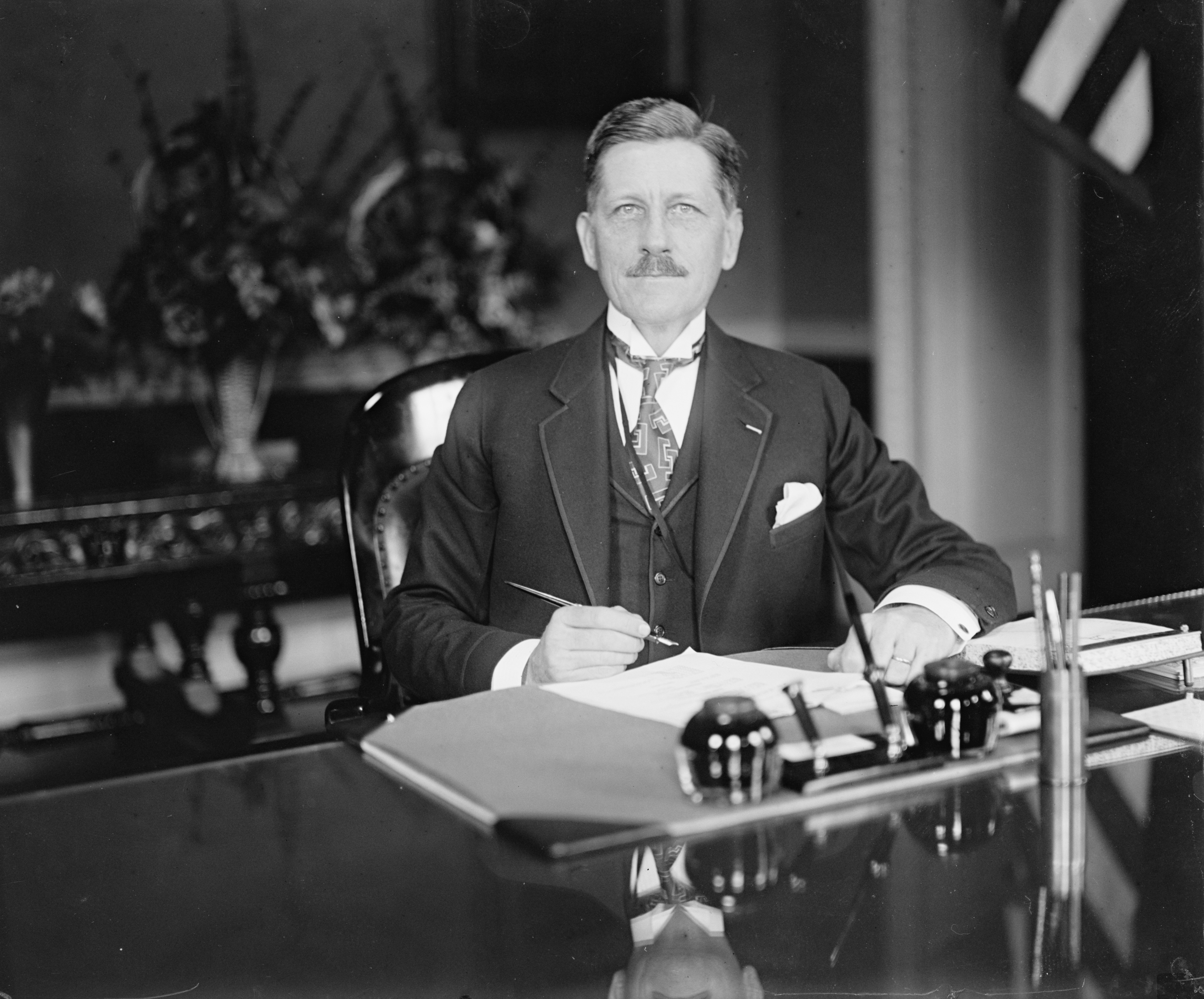
Patrick J. Hurley, U.S. Ambassador to China in 1945

During the talks between the KMT and CCP, United States Ambassador to China Patrick J. Hurley, traveled to Chongqing to assist with the negotiations and to ensure that U.S. policy and goals were realized in China. Hurley arrived in Chongqing in mid-August with Mao Zedong and Zhang Zhizong. The U.S. objective was to maintain peace between the KMT and CCP, and stability in the Chinese region, while remaining out of China's internal affairs. The U.S. government believed that China would not be effective in a possible war against the USSR, due to assumptions that such a war would be primarily air-based. Therefore, the U.S. saw no use in sending military support to the KMT if a civil war were to erupt. The U.S. believed that, if a civil war was to occur, without U.S. military intervention, it would be likely that the CCP would win. Therefore, to ensure the survival of the KMT, the U.S. supported the idea of a joint coalition government of the KMT and CCP. This was believed to be the most effective method of preventing complete CCP control over China without major U.S. military intervention.

Throughout the negotiations, Hurley was optimistic about the talks, even near the end, stating, "the rapprochement between the two leading parties of China seems to be progressing and the discussion and rumors of civil war recede as the conference continues." This was primarily due to his deep investment in the talks and desire for the talks to have gone smoothly.

Hurley resigned from his position on 27 November due to his belief that the United States were secretly favoring the CCP. With Hurley's resignation, the U.S. sent General George Marshall to continue mediation in China.

=== Soviet Union ===
As well as the U.S., the Soviets also sent an ambassador to assist with the negotiations and to ensure that Soviet policy and goals in the region were met. The USSR ambassador Apollon Petrov was sent to Chongqing in August. The Soviets had similar aims to the United States, wishing to prevent war between the two parties, but had different motives: the Soviets wished for peace between the two parties because they believed that a civil war would impede the reconstruction of China, not because they were concerned with which side would prevail in the event of a civil war. The Soviet Union were receptive to the idea of another united front between the Nationalists and the Communists, as Stalin told the Chinese Communists that it was their "best hope for the future".

Due to ideological similarities, the Soviets did favor the CCP, however during the Double Tenth Agreement did not outwardly support the party. The Soviet invasion of Manchuria at the end of World War II resulted in Soviet occupation of the region, which continued during the talks. The CCP did show a desire to obtain the land. The Soviets assisted CCP skirmishes within Manchuria by turning over seized Japanese armaments to the CCP and by preventing KMT access to Manchuria.

Unlike Hurley, the Soviets mainly saw the talks as a disappointment, with Stalin even stating that the Soviet government was not happy with the Chinese Communists' behavior and that the KMT government should have made more concessions towards the CCP.

== See also ==
- Xi'an Incident
- Chinese Civil War
  - Chinese Communist Revolution
- Outline of the Chinese Civil War
- Cross-strait relations
- First Ma–Xi meeting
