= Political Consultative Conference (Republic of China) =

1946 conference to forestall the Chinese Civil War

Political Consultative Conference 政治協商會議

Type
- Type: Constituent assembly

History
- Founded: 10 January 1946
- Disbanded: 31 January 1946
- Succeeded by: National Constituent Assembly (led by KMT); First plenary session of the Chinese People's Political Consultative Conference (led by CCP)

Leadership
- Chairman of the National Assembly: Sun Fo, KMT
- Kuomintang leader: Chiang Kai-shek
- Opposition party leaders: Mao Zedong, CCP; Zeng Qi, YCP; Zhang Lan, CDL

Structure
- Seats: 38
- Political groups: Ruling party: Kuomintang (8); Opposition parties: Chinese Communist Party (7); Young China Party (5); China Democratic League (9); Independents: Independents (9)
- Committees: 6 committees

Meeting place
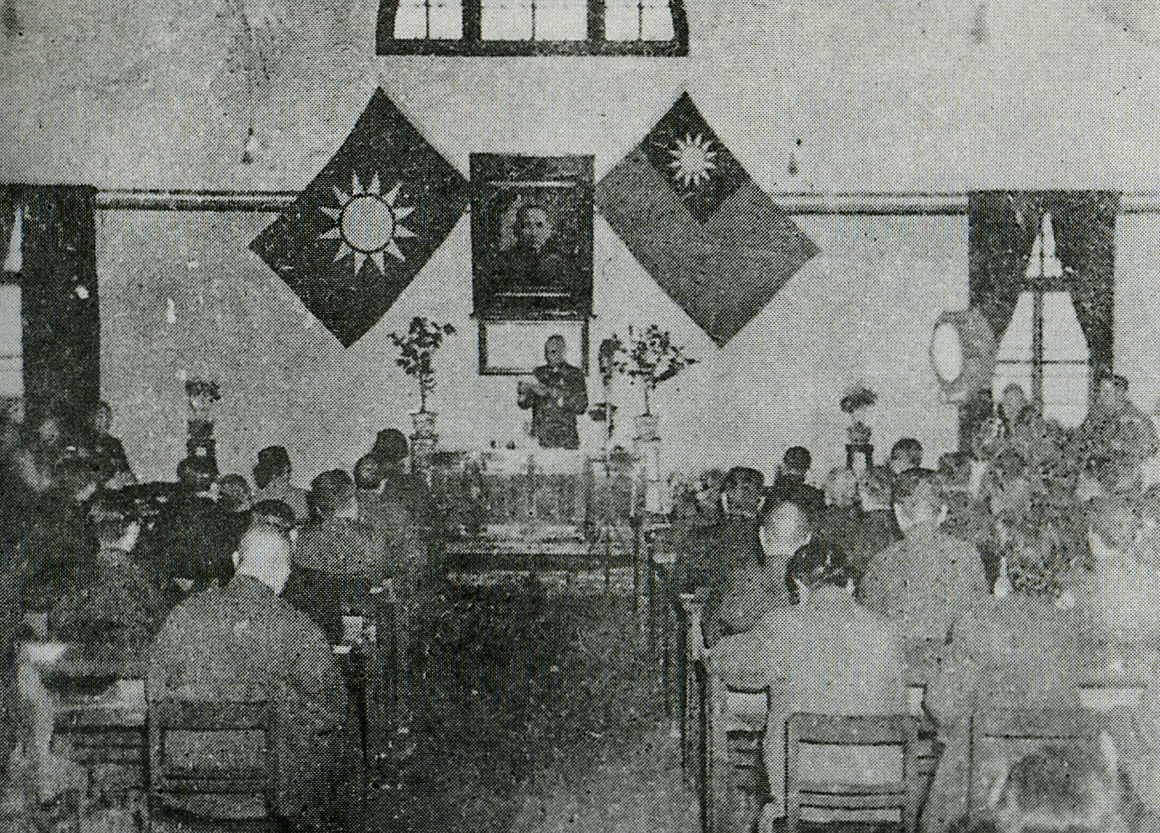
- The site of the negotiation in Chongqing, China

Political Consultative Conference
- Traditional Chinese: 政治協商會議
- Simplified Chinese: 政治协商会议
Transcriptions
Standard Mandarin
- Hanyu Pinyin: Zhèngzhì Xiéshāng Huìyì

The Political Consultative Conference (PCC) was a conference held on 10–31 January 1946 in the Republic of China between the Kuomintang (KMT) and the Chinese Communist Party (CCP) to create a coalition government. The PCC was convened as part of the Double Tenth Agreement between the KMT and the CCP. The conference ultimately ended in failure.

== Background ==
On 10 October 1945, the KMT and the CCP signed the Double Tenth Agreement in Chongqing, then ancillary capital of Nationalist government. One of the conditions agreed was the creation of a political consultative conference, participated by political party and non-party representatives. Afterwards, Soviet leader Joseph Stalin advised both parties to hold a consultative conference to manage their differences.

== Meeting ==
Due to pressure from the United States, CCP and other actors, Chiang Kai-shek eventually relented and agreed to hold a political consultative conference. The PCC was tasked with creating a new constitution and a democratic government.

The PCC was held in Chongqing during 10–31 January 1946, which received both local and nationwide attention. The CCP organized many support meetings for these conference across the country, which were routinely disrupted by the secret police of the Nationalist government attempting to encourage anti-CCP sentiments. The Conference, lasted until 31 January, adopted 12 resolutions including reforming government, amending draft constitution, and convening National Constituent Assembly. A committee on organizing draft constitution was also formed.

=== Membership ===
Party	Officeholder	Office
KMT	Sun Fo	Leglslative Yuan President
KMT	Wu Tiecheng	Secretary-General of the Central Party Committee of the Kuomintang
KMT	Chen Pu-lei	Deputy Secretary-General of the Supreme Council for National Defense
KMT	Chen Lifu	Head of Party Organization
KMT	Chang Li-sheng	Minister of the Interior
KMT	Wang Shijie	Minister of Foreign Affairs
KMT	Shao Lizi	Secretary-General of the National Political Participation Association
KMT	Zhang Qun	Governor of Sichuan
CCP	Zhou Enlai	Vice Chairman of the CCP, head of the CCP delegation
CCP	Dong Biwu	Minister of Foreign Affairs
CCP	Ye Jianying	Chief of Staff of the Eight Route Army
CCP	Wu Yuzhang	Representative of the National Political Participation Association
CCP	Wang Ruofei	Representative of the Central Committee in Chongqing
CCP	Lu Dingyi	Head of the Publicity Department
CCP	Deng Yingchao	Head of the Women's Department
CDL	Zhang Lan	Representative of the National Political Participation Association and the CDL Chairman
CDL	Luo Longji	Professor of the National Southwestern Associated University and the CDL Publicity Department Head
CDL	Carsun Chang	Representative of the China National Socialist Party
CDL	Zhang Bojun	Chairman of the Third Party
CDL	Zhang Dongsun	Representative of the China National Socialist Party
CDL	Shen Junru	Representative of the Chinese People's National Salvation Association
CDL	Huang Yanpei	Representative of the National Association of Vocational Education of China
CDL	Liang Shuming	Representative of the Rural Reconstruction Movement
CDL	Zhang Shenfu	Professor of the Tsinghua University
YCP	Zeng Qi	Chairman of the YCP
YCP	Chen Qitian	Representative of the National Political Suffrage Association
YCP	Yang Yongjun	Responsible person in South China
YCP	Yu Jiaju	Political member of the university professors
YCP	Chang Naide	Political member of the university professors
Independent	Mo Teh-hui	Political member
Independent	Shao Congxu	Political member
Independent	Wang Yun-wu	Political member, director of The Commercial Press
Independent	Fu Ssu-nien	Political member, university professor
Independent	Hu Zhengzhi	Political member, director of Ta Kung Pao
Independent	Guo Moruo	Political writer
Independent	Qian Yongming	Political member, chairman of the Bank of Communications
Independent	Miao Yuntai	Representative of the southwest national capitalists
Independent	Li Zhuchen	Representative of the north China industrial capitalists

== Collapse of the talks ==
On 10 February 1946, riots broke out in Jiaochangkou at the center of Chongqing. The incident led to the collapse of the relations between CCP and KMT, and the continuation of the Chinese Civil War.
