= Chinese People's National Salvation Association =

Defunct political group in mainland China

The Chinese People's National Salvation Association (Chinese: 中国人民救国会; pinyin: Zhōngguó Rénmín Jiùguó Huì) was a left-wing political faction in China.

== History ==
The He–Umezu Agreement of 1935 between the Republic of China and the Empire of Japan led to the withdrawal of the Nationalist government's political and military forces from North China, deepening the crisis in North China's special status. This sparked the December 9th Movement, a student movement in Beiping and Tianjin dedicated to national salvation against Japanese aggression. The national anti-Japanese movement surged, and the left-wing cultural movement led by the Chinese Communist Party (CCP), based on the August 1 Declaration, quickly shifted towards establishing a united front of cultural circles for national salvation against Japan. On 12 December 1935, Tao Xingzhi, along with Ma Xiangbo, Hu Yuzhi, Shen Junru, Zou Taofen, Wang Zaoshi, Li Gongpu, and over 280 others, jointly issued the Declaration of the Shanghai Cultural Circles' National Salvation Movement, proposing eight anti-Japanese measures. In January 1936, the Shanghai Cultural Circles' National Salvation Association adopted the Shanghai Cultural Circles' National Salvation Association's National Crisis Education Plan, drafted by Tao Xingzhi. In February 1936, the National Crisis Education Society was established, centered around the educational institutions founded by Tao Xingzhi, and adopted the Declaration of the Establishment of the National Crisis Education Society. Zhang Jingfu served as the Party Secretary of the National Crisis Education Society.

The National Salvation Federation of All Circles was established in Shanghai on 31 May 1936. It was a nationwide anti-Japanese national salvation organization centered in Shanghai with a broad mass base. Fifteen people, including Soong Ching-ling, Shen Junru, Zou Taofen, Zhang Naiqi, Li Gongpu, Sha Qianli, Shi Liang, Wang Zaoshi, and Tao Xingzhi, were elected as standing committee members. On 15 July 1936, the Hong Kong-based Life Daily published an article titled Several Basic Conditions and Minimum Requirements for Unity Against Aggression, jointly signed by four leaders of the National Salvation Federation: Tao Xingzhi, Zou Taofen, Shen Junru, and Zhang Naiqi, actively responding to the CCP's August 1 Declaration in Paris, published Mao Zedong's open letter in response to Zhang, Tao, Zou, Shen, and all members of the National Salvation Federation, expressing "a sincere hope for unity and joint struggle to save the life of the motherland." During his two-plus years in Europe and America, Tao Xingzhi comprehensively promoted the CCP's advocacy of a united front against Japanese aggression to overseas Chinese and students, and promoted the establishment of the All-American Overseas Chinese National Salvation Association and the All-European Overseas Chinese Anti-Japanese National Salvation Association on 20 September 1936.

The association joined the China Democratic Political League (later renamed the China Democratic League) in 1941, becoming a progressive force within the League. After Japan's surrender in World War II in 1945, the association was renamed the Chinese People's Salvation Association and dedicated himself to the democratic, peaceful, and patriotic movement. On 18 December 1949, after the founding of the People's Republic of China, the Chinese People's Salvation Association, led by Shen Junru, held tea parties simultaneously in Beijing, Shanghai, and Guangzhou. Given that all the political propositions of the Salvation Association had been realized, the Chinese People's Salvation Association was declared to be closed. Shen Junru and nine others were elected to organize the Chinese People's Salvation Association Memorial Committee to handle matters related to the permanent commemoration of Zou Taofen, Tao Xingzhi, Li Gongpu, Du Chongyuan, and other members who sacrificed their lives for the national salvation movement.
