= Nationalist government =

Government led by the Kuomintang from 1925–1948 in mainland China

National Government of the Republic of China 中華民國國民政府
- Emblem
- Polity type: Unitary parliamentary constitutional republic under a provisional one-party system
- Constitution: Provisional Constitution of the Republic of China
- Formation: 1 July 1925
- Dissolved: 28 May 1948

Legislative branch
- Name: Legislative Yuan
- Type: Unicameral
- Presiding officer: President of the Legislative Yuan

Executive branch
- Head of state
- Title: Chairman
- Appointer: Central Executive Committee of the Kuomintang
- Head of government
- Title: Premier
- Appointer: Chairman
- Cabinet
- Name: Executive Yuan
- Leader: Premier
- Deputy leader: Vice Premier

Judicial branch
- Name: Judicial Yuan

Civil service branch
- Name: Examination Yuan

Auditory branch
- Name: Control Yuan

The Nationalist government (Note: also referred to as the Nationalist regime) (Chinese: 國民政府), officially the National Government of the Republic of China (Chinese: 中華民國國民政府), was the government of China from 1928 to 1948. It was established by the Kuomintang (KMT) in Guangzhou after the reorganization of the Army and Navy Marshal stronghold. Following the Northern Expedition, the government was able to defeat and overthrow the Beiyang government and become the legitimate government of China with its capital settled in Nanjing since 1927. The Nationalist government lasted until 20 May 1948 when it dissolved itself and was replaced by a constitutional government following the promulgation of a formal constitution. During the period the KMT-led government ruled China as a one-party state.

Following the outbreak of the Xinhai Revolution, revolutionary leader Sun Yat-sen was elected to be China's provisional president and founded the Provisional Government of the Republic of China. To preserve national unity, Sun ceded the presidency to military strongman Yuan Shikai, who established the Beiyang government. After a failed attempt to install himself as Emperor of China, Yuan died in 1916, leaving a power vacuum which resulted in China being divided into several warlord fiefs and rival governments. After the end of the Northern Expedition in 1928, they were nominally reunified under the Nationalist government in Nanjing, led by Chiang Kai-shek. Chiang initially governed the country as a de facto, and sometimes also de jure, military dictator. The government was in place until it was replaced by the current Government of the Republic of China in the newly promulgated Constitution of the Republic of China of 1947.

== History ==
The oldest surviving republic in East Asia, the Republic of China was formally established on 1 January 1912 in mainland China following the Xinhai Revolution, which itself began with the Wuchang Uprising on 10 October 1911, replacing the Qing dynasty and ending nearly three thousand years of imperial rule in China. Central authority waxed and waned in response to warlordism (1915–1928), Japanese invasion (1937–1945), and the Chinese Civil War (1927–1949), with central authority strongest during the Nanjing Decade (1927–1937), when most of China came under the control of the Kuomintang (KMT) under an authoritarian one-party state. Despite his varying formal positions in the party, government and the army, the ultimate authority was held by Chiang Kai-shek who transformed the country into a military dictatorship.

At the end of World War II in 1945, the Empire of Japan surrendered control of Taiwan and its island groups to the Allies, and Taiwan was placed under the Republic of China's administrative control. The legitimacy of this transfer is disputed and is another aspect of the disputed political status of Taiwan.

After World War II, the civil war between the ruling Kuomintang and the Chinese Communist Party (CCP) resumed, despite attempts at mediation by the United States. The Nationalist government began drafting the Constitution of the Republic of China under a National Assembly, but was boycotted by the CCP. With the promulgation of the constitution, the Nationalist government was reorganized into the Government of the Republic of China.

=== Founding ===
After Sun's death on 12 March 1925, four months later on 1 July 1925, the Nationalist government was established in Guangzhou.

The following year, as Generalissimo of the National Revolutionary Army, Chiang Kai-shek became the de facto leader of the Kuomintang (KMT), or Chinese Nationalist Party. He especially headed the right wing of the Nationalist Party, while the Communists formed part of the Party's left-wing. Chiang led the Northern Expedition through China with the intention of defeating the warlords and unifying the country. The National Revolutionary Army received significant aid from the Soviet Union; Chiang himself was surrounded by Soviet military advisors.

In April 1927, Chiang broke with and purged the Communists, killing thousands. This precipitated the agrarian struggle in the south of China involving peasant associations supported by the CCP, and eventually led to the Chinese Civil War between the Nationalist Party and the CCP. Chiang Kai-shek pushed the CCP into the interior as he sought to destroy them, and moved the Nationalist government to Nanjing in 1927. Leftists within the KMT still allied to the CCP, led by Wang Jingwei, had established a rival Nationalist Government in Wuhan two months earlier, but soon joined Chiang in Nanjing in August 1927. By the following year, Chiang's army had captured Beijing after overthrowing the Beiyang government and unified the entire nation, at least nominally, marking the beginning the Nanjing decade.

=== Nanjing decade and war with Japan ===
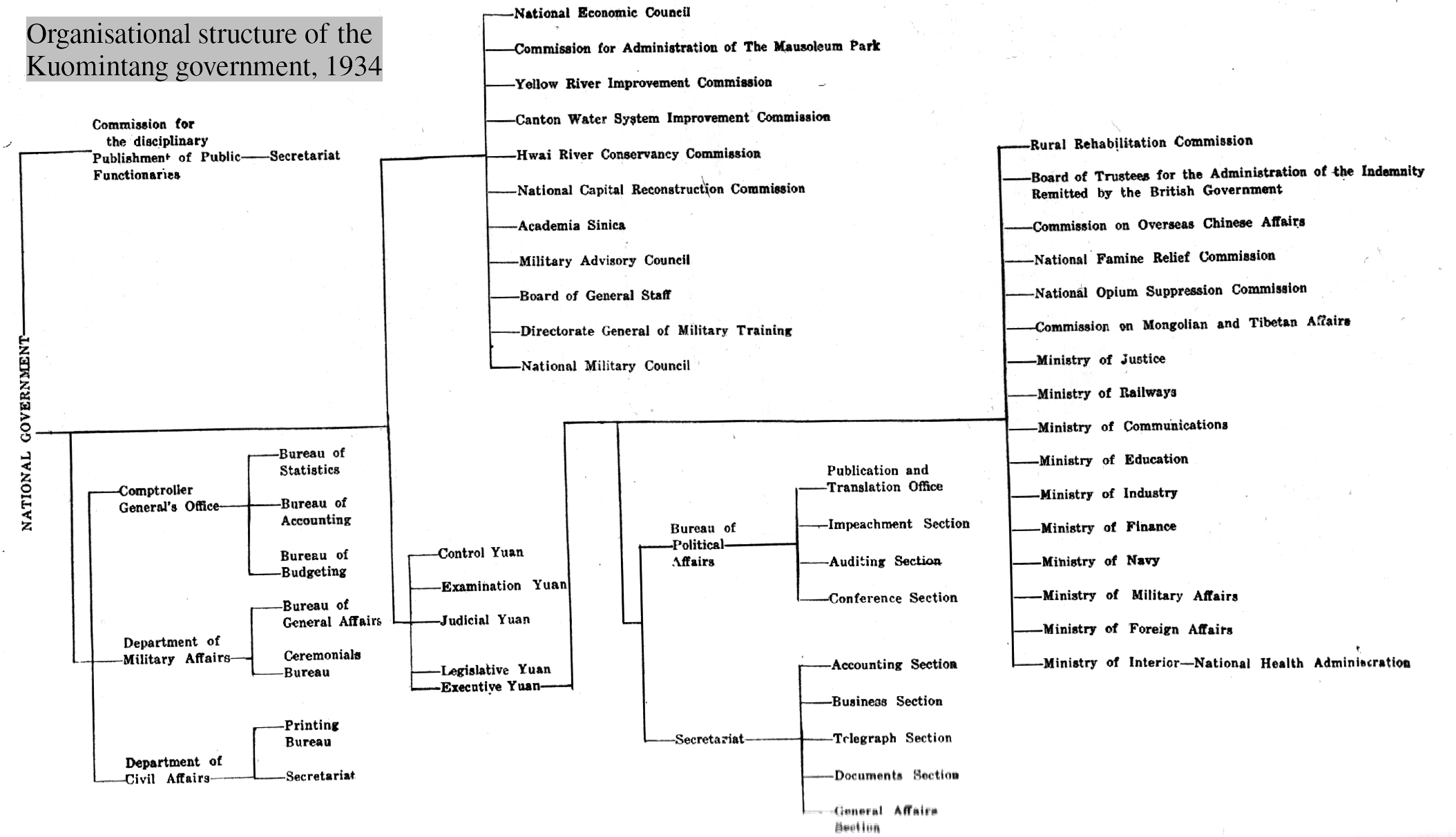
Organisational chart of the KMT regime in 1934

According to Sun Yat-sen's "Three Stages of Revolution" theory, the KMT was to rebuild China in three phases: the first stage was military unification, which was carried out with the Northern Expedition; the second was "political tutelage" which was a provisional government led by the KMT to educate people about their political and civil rights, and the third stage would be constitutional government.(Fung 2000, p. 30) By 1928, the Nationalists claimed that they had succeeded in reunifying China and were beginning the second stage, the period of so-called "tutelage". In 1929, the KMT first attempted to start the ending of the unequal treaties and regain the extraterritoriality. In 1931, they promulgated a provisional constitution that established the one-party rule of the KMT and promised eventual democratization. In practice, this meant that Chiang Kai-Shek was able to continue authoritarian rule. In the 1930s, the Nationalist government sought to adopt some aspects of Nazi Germany mode of governance.

Even had it been the KMT's intention, historians such as Edmund Fung argue that they may not have been able to establish a democracy under the circumstances of the time.(Fung 2000, p. 30) Despite nominal reunification, the Chiang's Nationalist Government relied heavily on the support of warlords such as Ma Hushan, Yan Xishan, and Zhang Xueliang to exert control on the provinces. The loyalty of these figures was often highly suspect, and they frequently engaged in acts of open defiance, as in the Xi'an Incident of 1936, or even rebellion. In alliance with local landlords and other power-brokers, they blocked moderate land reforms that might have benefited the rural poor. Instead, the poor peasants remained a consistent source of recruits for the Communist Party. While weakened by frequent massacres and purges—historian Rudolph Rummel estimated that 1,654,000 people were killed by the KMT in anti-Communist purges during this period—the Communists were able to survive and posed a major latent threat to the regime. However, perhaps the biggest challenges came from within the administration itself. As Chiang Kai-Shek told the state council: "Our organization becomes worse and worse ... many staff members just sit at their desks and gaze into space, others read newspapers and still others sleep." Corruption was endemic at all levels of government. The tension between Chiang's centralizing tendencies and the warlords who supported him led to friction and inconsistent direction. Even the KMT itself was disunified, with the pro-Chiang factions of the CC Clique, Political Study Clique, and fascist-inspired Blue Shirts Society opposed by a left-wing faction under Wang Jingwei and a right-wing faction influenced by Hu Hanmin. To control the opposing KMT factions, Chiang relied increasingly on the National Revolutionary Army.

Economic growth and social improvements were mixed. The Kuomintang supported women's rights and education, the abolition of polygamy, and foot binding. Under Chiang's leadership, a women's quota in the parliament with reserved seats for women was enacted. During the Nanjing Decade, the spread of education increased the literacy rate across China and promoted the ideals of Sun Yat-sen's Three Principles of the People of democracy, republicanism, science, constitutionalism, and Chinese nationalism based on the Political Tutelage of the Kuomintang. However, periodic famines continued: in Northern China from 1928 to 1930, in Sichuan from 1936 to 1937, and in Henan from 1942 to 1943. In total, these famines cost at least 11.7 million lives. GDP growth averaged 3.9 per cent a year from 1929 to 1941 and per capita GDP about 1.8 per cent. Among other institutions, the Nationalist government founded the Academia Sinica and the Central Bank of China. In 1932, China for the first time sent teams to the Olympic Games.

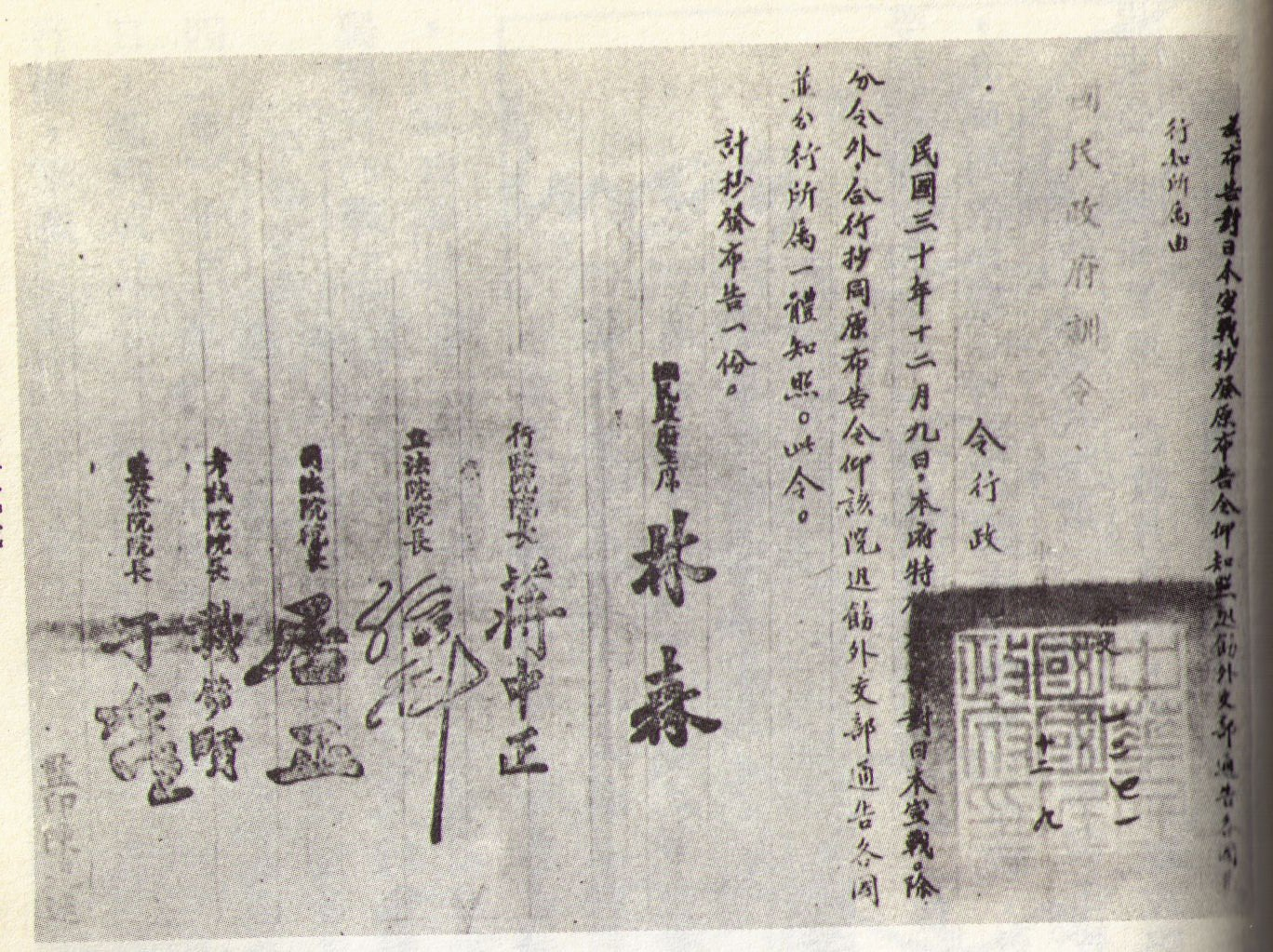
War Declaration against Japan by the Chongqing Nationalist government on 9 December 1941

The Nationalists faced a new challenge with the Japanese invasion of Manchuria in 1931, with hostilities continuing through the Second Sino-Japanese War, part of World War II, from 1937 to 1945. The Nationalists retreated from Nanjing to Chongqing. In 1945, after the war of eight years, Japan surrendered and the Republic of China, under the name "China", became one of the founding members of the United Nations. The government returned to Nanjing in 1946.

=== Post–World War II ===
Following the defeat of Japan at the end of World War II, Taiwan was surrendered to the Allies, with ROC troops accepting the surrender of the Japanese garrison. The government of the ROC proclaimed the "retrocession" of Taiwan to the Republic of China and established a provincial government on the island. The military administration of the ROC extended over Taiwan, which led to widespread unrest and increasing tensions between local Taiwanese and mainlanders. The shooting of a civilian on 28 February 1947 triggered an island-wide unrest, which was brutally suppressed with military force in what is now known as the February 28 Incident. Mainstream estimates of casualties range from 18,000 to 30,000, mainly Taiwanese elites. The 28 February Incident has had far-reaching effects on subsequent Taiwanese history.

From 1945 to 1947, under United States mediation, especially through the Marshall Mission, the Nationalists and Communists agreed to start a series of peace talks aiming at establishing a coalition government. The two parties agreed to open multiparty talks on post-World War II political reforms via a Political Consultative Conference. This was included in the Double Tenth Agreement. This agreement was implemented by the Nationalist Government, who organized the first Political Consultative Assembly from 10 to 31 January 1946. Representatives of the Kuomintang, CCP, Chinese Youth Party, and China Democratic League, as well as independent delegates, attended the conference in Chongqing. However, shortly afterward, the two parties failed to reach an agreement and the civil war resumed. In the context of political and military animosity, the National Assembly was summoned by the Nationalists without the participation of the CCP and promulgated the Constitution of the Republic of China. The constitution was criticized by the CCP, and led to the final break between the two sides. The full-scale civil war resumed from early 1947.

After the National Assembly election, the drafted Constitution was adopted by the National Assembly on 25 December 1946, promulgated by the National Government on 1 January 1947, and went into effect on 25 December 1947. The Constitution was seen as the third and final stage of Kuomintang reconstruction of China. Chiang Kai-shek was also elected as the 1st President of the Republic of China under the constitution by the National Assembly in 1948, with Li Zongren being elected as vice-president. The Nationalist Government was abolished on 20 May 1948 and replaced with an government with the presidential inauguration of Chiang. The CCP, though invited to the convention that drafted it, boycotted and declared after the ratification that not only would it not recognize the ROC constitution, but all bills passed by the Nationalist administration would be disregarded as well. Zhou Enlai challenged the legitimacy of the National Assembly in 1947 by accusing the KMT of hand-picking the members of the National Assembly 10 years earlier; claiming they thus could not legitimately represent the Chinese people.

== Structure ==
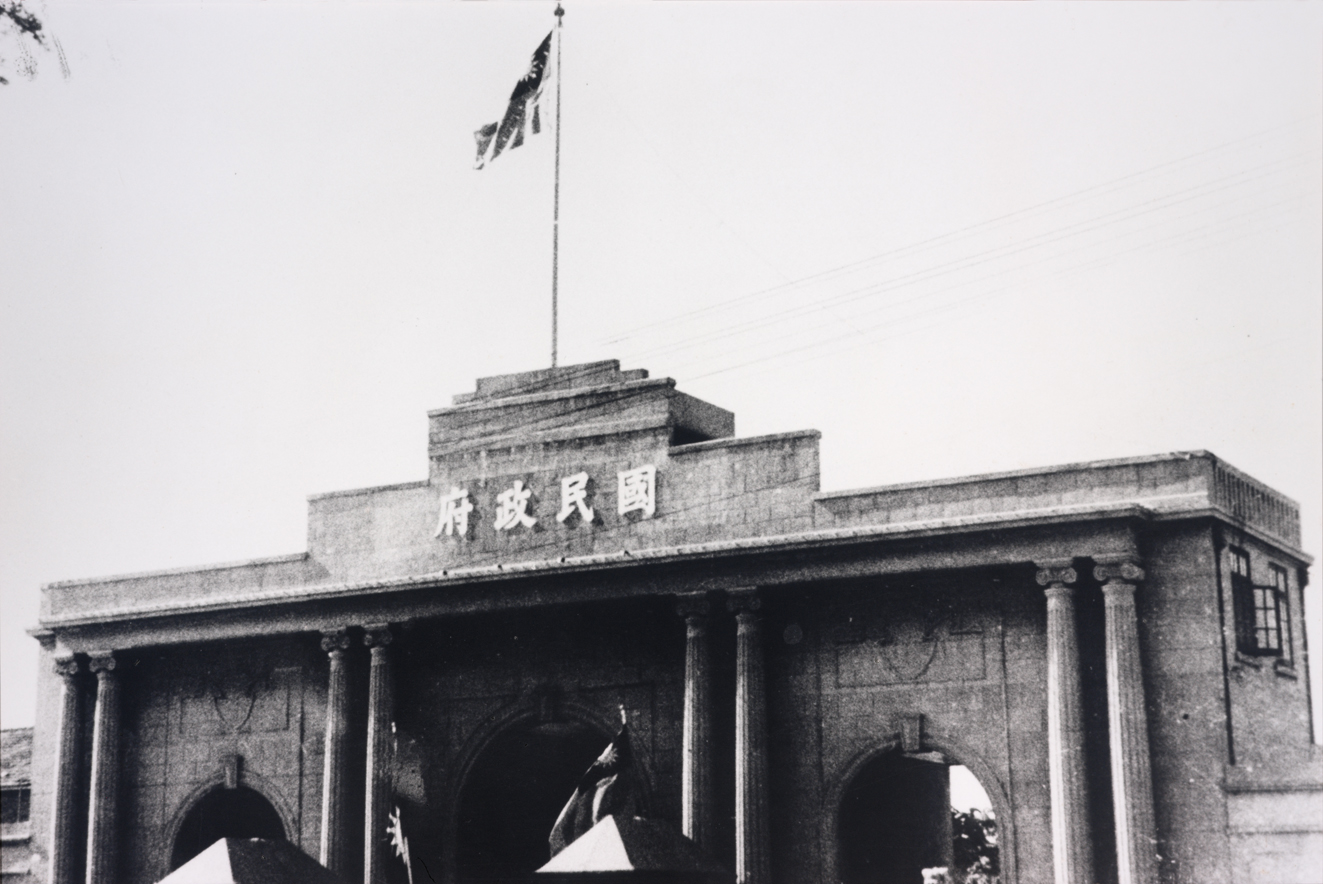
Headquarters of the National Government in Nanjing

The National Government governed under a dual-party state apparatus under the ideology of Dang Guo, effectively making it a one-party state where the ultimate power was wielded by the army and personally by Chiang Kai-shek regardless of his formal positions and the relations between the two chambers of parliament, the Executive Yuan and the Legislative Yuan. However, existing parties continued to operate and new ones formed. After the end of the Second World War, and particularly after the passage of the constitution in 1946, the National Government was reconstituted to include multiple parties, in preparation for a full democratic government to come.

In February 1928, the Fourth Plenary Session of the 2nd Kuomintang National Congress held in Nanjing passed the Reorganization of the National Government Act. This act stipulated the national government was to be directed and regulated under the Central Executive Committee of the Kuomintang, with the Committee of the National Government being elected by KMT Central Committee. Under the national government was seven ministries – Interior, Foreign Affairs, Finance, Transport, Justice, Agriculture and Mines, and Commerce. There were also additional institutions such as the Supreme Court, Control Yuan, and the General Academy.

With the promulgation of the Organic Law of the National Government in October 1928, the government was reorganized into five different branches or Yuan, namely the Executive Yuan, Legislative Yuan, Judicial Yuan, Examination Yuan as well as the Control Yuan. The Chairman of the National Government was to be the head-of-state and commander-in-chief of the National Revolutionary Army. Chiang Kai-shek was appointed as the first Chairman of the National Government, a position he would retain until 1931. The Organic Law also stipulated that the Kuomintang, through its National Congress and Central Executive Committee, would exercise sovereign power during the period of political tutelage, and the KMT's Political Council would guide and superintend the National Government in the execution of important national affairs and that the council has the power to interpret or amend the organic law.

Authority within the Nationalist government ultimately lay with Chiang Kai-shek. All major policy changes on military, diplomatic, or economic issues required his approval. According to historian Odd Arne Westad, "no other leader within the GMD had the authority to force through even the simplest decisions.The practical power of high-ranking officials like ministers or the head of the Executive Yuan was more closely tied to their relationship with Chiang than with the formal authority of their position. Chiang created multiple layers of power in his administration which he sometimes played off each other to prevent individuals or cliques from gathering power that could oppose his authority.

The Nationalist government exercised relatively little control in China's border regions, where the political fragmentation along ethnic lines that began after the fall of the Qing dynasty continued.

== Locations ==
Almost all of the former sites of the Nationalist government are headquartered in the city of Nanjing, the capital at the time, with only one exception.

Name	Image	Location	Construction Date	Description
Headquarters of the Nationalist Government		No.292 Changjiang Road, Xuanwu District, Nanjing	1870-1930s	The complex served as Viceroy of Liangjiang's Office in Qing dynasty, and as the Presidential Palace in 1948.
Executive Yuan (1928)		No.19 Dongjian Road, Xuanwu District, Nanjing	1920s	The building, serving as the Executive Yuan from 1928 to 1937, is now a part of the Presidential Palace complex.
Executive Yuan (1946)		No.252-254 Zhongshan North Road, Gulou District, Nanjing	1930	The building was the headquarter of the Ministry of Railways at first, then the site of Executive Yuan from 1946 to 1949. After the communists took over Nanjing, it became a building of PLA Nanjing Political College.
Executive Yuan (1949)		Zhongshan East Road, Xuanwu District, Nanjing	1929	It was the site of Lizhi She in the 1930s. In 1949, the constitutional government decided to move the Executive Yuan into this building. The building now served as a part of Zhongshan Hotel.
Legislative Yuan (1928)		No.273 Baixia Road, Qinhuai District, Nanjing		It was the site of the "Mistress House". The Nationalist government chose the house to become the seat of Legislative Yuan in 1928.
Legislative Yuan (1946) & Control Yuan		No.105 Zhongshan North Road, Gulou District, Nanjing	1935	The building was Nanjing City Hall during the Japanese occupation. After the Second World War, it became the offices of Legislative Yuan and Control Yuan. Now it is Nanjing Soldiers' Club.
Judicial Yuan's Entrance		No.251 Zhongshan Road, Gulou District, Nanjing	1935	The building was destroyed by fire in April 1949. Only the gate remains.
Examination Yuan		No.41-43 Beijing East Road, Xuanwu District, Nanjing	1930s	The building is now served as Nanjing City Government Offices and the Committee of Nanjing, CPPCC.
Supreme Court		No.101 Zhongshan North Road, Gulou District, Nanjing	1933	The building was also served as the Supreme Prosecutor Office
Military Affairs Commission		No.292 Changjiang Road, Xuanwu District, Nanjing	1870s	This house was built in 1870s, after Taiping Rebellion. In the 1930s, Chiang Kai-shek chose it to be one of the headquarters of the Military Affairs Commission. The house is located in the Presidential Palace complex and becoming a popular tourist attraction now.
National Resource Commission		No.200 Zhongshan North Road, Gulou District, Nanjing	1947	The building is now an office building of Nanjing Tech University
Ministry of Economic Affairs		No.145 Zhongshan East Road, Xuanwu District, Nanjing		The building is now served as the office of Nanjing Sports Bureau.
Central Bank		No.15 East-1 Zhongshan Rd, Huangpu District, Shanghai	1899–1902	This was the only institution not headquartered in the city of Nanjing. Once being the Shanghai branch of Russo-Chinese Bank, this building now becomes Shanghai Foreign Exchange Trading Center.
Ministry of Health		No.305 Zhongshan East Road, Xuanwu District, Nanjing	1931	The building was in the site of the National Central Hospital complex. It is Nanjing General Hospital of Nanjing Military Command now.
Ministry of Education		Chengxian Street, Xuanwu District, Nanjing		The building is now occupied by some governmental officials.
Ministry of Transportation & Communications		No.303-305 Zhongshan North Road, Gulou District, Nanjing	1932–1934	Opposite was the site of the Executive Yuan. After the communists took over Nanjing, it became a building of PLA Nanjing Political College.
National Assembly Hall (1936)		No.2 Sipailou, Xuanwu District, Nanjing	1930s	Before the National Theatre of Drama and Music was completed, the National Assembly was held in the Auditorium of National Central University.
National Assembly Hall (1946)		No.264 Changjiang Road, Xuanwu District, Nanjing	1935	The building was served as the National Theatre of Drama and Music. After the World War II, it became the meeting place of the National Assembly. It was the site of 1948 presidential election and the birthplace of the Constitution. So this building played an important role in the modern history of China.
Residence of the Chairman (1946)		Purple Mountain, Xuanwu District, Nanjing	1931–1934	Also known as "the Red Hill Mansion" and "Mei-ling Villa", the building was one of the main residences of Chiang & Soong in Nanjing after WWII. And it became one of the official residences of the President of the ROC from 1948 to 1949.

When the city of Nanjing was not captured by the Nationalist government, they chose the following buildings as their headquarters.

Name	Image	Location	Construction Date	Description
Nationalist government in Canton (1925)		No.118 Yuehua rd, Yuexiu District, Guangzhou		In 1925, the Nationalist government was established here. Today, all the buildings inside were demolished except the gate.
Nationalist government in Wuhan (1926)		No.708, Zhongshan Avenue, Wuhan	1917–1921	It was also called Nanyang Tobacco Building. In 1926, the National Revolutionary Army took control of Wuhan. Then, the officials of KMT chose Nanyang Tobacco Building to become the seat of the Nationalist government.
Nationalist government in Chongqing (1939)		Yuzhong District, Chongqing		In the period of the Second Sino-Japanese War, this building was served as the headquarters of the Nationalist government until they moved back to Nanjing. The building was demolished in the 1980s.
Nationalist government in Hankow (1927)		Wuchang Uprising Memorial Building	1927	During the Wuhan Nationalist government and during the Battle of Wuhan, This was the main government administration building. Nanyang Tobacco Building however, was the main administration during the Wuhan Nationalist Government. This building used to serve as the Headquarters of the Hubei Provincial Government during the Qing Dynasty and now serves as the Wuchang Uprising Memorial Building.

== Military ==
=== Republic of China Navy ===
The Ministry of the Navy (海軍部) was a military ministry-level agency established by the Nationalist government on April 12, 1929, which was independent and existed parallel with the Military Affairs Commission at the time of establishment. Therefore, unlike the air force, the navy of the Nationalist government was a fully independent service branch and was not part of the National Revolutionary Army.

The primary mission of the Ministry of the Navy was to rebuild the Republic of China Navy and to promote the development of maritime power. By 1937, however, most of the naval forces under its command were nearly annihilated in the early naval battles of the Second Sino-Japanese War by the Imperial Japanese Navy.

On January 1, 1938, with virtually no warships left under its control, the Ministry was dissolved and merged into the Navy Command Headquarters under the Military Affairs Commission of the Nationalist government.

=== National Revolutionary Army ===
The National Revolutionary Army (NRA; traditional Chinese: 國民革命軍; simplified Chinese: 国民革命军; pinyin: Guómín Gémìng Jūn; Wade–Giles: Kuo-min Ke-ming Chün), pre-1928 sometimes shortened to Revolutionary Army (革命軍) and between 1928 and 1947 as National Army (國軍), was the Military Arm of the Kuomintang (KMT) from 1925 until 1947, commanded by the Military Affairs Commission of the Nationalist government. Compared to the Republic of China Navy, the NRA was more distinctly party-owned, with tighter political control by the Kuomintang, whereas the Navy retained more characteristics of a state-operated and professionally autonomous force.

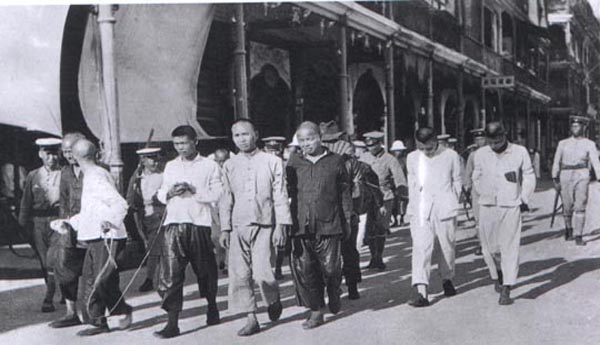
NRA troops rounding up Communist prisoners for execution

Originally organised with Soviet aid as a means for the KMT to unify China against warlordism, the National Revolutionary Army fought major engagements in the Northern Expedition against the Chinese Beiyang Army warlords.

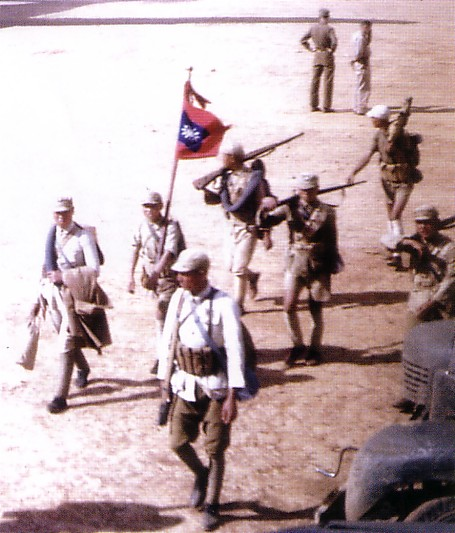
The NRA during World War II

Beginning in 1928, following the April 12 Incident and the KMT's split with the Communist factions, the NRA also launched a series of Encirclement Campaigns aimed at eradicating Communist base areas in the Chinese rural area. The NRA later fought in the Second Sino-Japanese War against the Imperial Japanese Army and the Imperial Japanese Navy, and then, in the Chinese Civil War, against the People's Liberation Army.

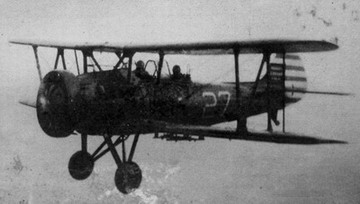
A Vought O2U Corsair observation aircraft, flown by the Chinese Nationalist Air Force. The type of aircraft was used extensively during anti-communist campaigns prior to the 2nd Sino Japanese War

The NRA included a largely independent aviation component which was known as the Air Force (空軍), and western historians usually described the air arm as the Chinese Nationalist Air Force, additionally it had an independent Air Defense force which was not under the commanding structure of any of those "Land Force" units.

Prior to the War, the NRA also had a Motor Torpedo Boat squadron, co existing with the Navy's torpedo flotilla, which is operated by the Submarine and Motor Torpedo Boat College, known as the S.M.C..

With the promulgation of the Constitution of the Republic of China in 1947 and the formal end of the KMT party-state, the National Revolutionary Army was renamed the Republic of China Armed Forces, with the bulk of its forces forming the Republic of China Army, which retreated to Taiwan in 1949.

=== Miscellaneous forces and militias ===
Local Security Forces, Warlord-affiliated troops, and Local Militias played a significant auxiliary role in the broader military structure of the Nationalist China, especially after the outbreak of the Second Sino-Japanese War in 1937. While not part of the centralized, regular National Revolutionary Army (NRA), many of these units were nominally incorporated into the NRA system during wartime mobilisation, often retaining their own command structures, political loyalties, and local identities.

- Local Security Forces (保安團) were provincial or county-level garrison forces originally organised for maintaining internal order, later drawn into frontline duties despite limited training and equipment. That said, in wealthier counties or around major cities, some of those Local Security Force Regiments were relatively well-funded and well-equipped, with training, pay, and even armament levels comparable to core NRA (Central Army) units. Their performance and discipline, in such cases, could approach regular army standards.
- Warlord-affiliated troops (雜牌軍), typically former warlord troops integrated through political negotiation rather than military standardisation, were loosely affiliated with the NRA but often operated with minimal coordination or discipline.
- The Local Militias (民團) referred to grassroots self-defense militias, often hastily armed and locally raised, who provided rear-area security or guerrilla resistance.

Although included under the broader NRA command on paper, these irregular forces were frequently marked by inconsistent combat effectiveness, poor logistical support, and divergent loyalties, complicating centralized command and control. Nonetheless, they constituted a substantial portion of the Chinese war effort, especially in regional defense and in supplementing the under-resourced central army.

An important exception, among those Warlord-affiliated troops, however, was the troops of the Sichuan Clique, known as the Szechwan Troops (川軍) who earned a reputation for their tenacious combat performance, resilience under extreme conditions, and remarkable tolerance for heavy casualties. Due to their consistent battlefield contributions during the Second Sino-Japanese War, most Sichuan clique units were formally recognised as part of the National Revolutionary Army, rather than being treated as auxiliary or irregular forces.

During the Second Sino-Japanese War, the two armed corps of the Chinese Communist were nominally incorporated into the National Revolutionary Army (while retaining separate commands), as the Eighth Route Army (八路軍) and the New Fourth Army (新四軍) respectively. Both broke away to form the People's Liberation Army shortly after the end of the war.

=== Forced conscription in WWII ===
Forced conscription campaigns were conducted by the military. In many rural places, military forces employed press-gangs, kidnappings, and mass roundups to meet numerical quotas. In some extreme cases, less than half of conscripts survived to complete basic training.

These harsh practices were especially prevalent among units not directly controlled by the central government, and among rapidly raised local militias and civil defense groups, and described by Rudolph Rummel as such:

Then there was the process of conscription. This was a deadly affair in which men were kidnapped for the army, rounded up indiscriminately by press-gangs or army units among those on the roads or in the towns and villages, or otherwise gathered together. Many men, some the very young and old, were killed resisting or trying to escape. Once collected, they would be roped or chained together and marched, with little food or water, long distances to camp. They often died or were killed along the way, sometimes less than 50 percent reaching camp alive. Then recruit camp was no better, with hospitals resembling Nazi concentration camps like Buchenwald. Probably 3,081,000 died during the Sino-Japanese War; likely another 1,131,000 during the Civil War – 4,212,000 dead in total. Just during conscription.

Because of the Nationalist government's increasing inability to fund the military, especially after Japan's success in Operation Ichigo, Nationalist authorities overlooked military corruption and smuggling. The Nationalist army increasingly turned to raiding villages to press-gang peasants into service and force marching them to assigned units.

== See also ==
- Government of the Republic of China
- Kuomintang
- Republic of China (1912–1949)
  - Beiyang government (1912–1928)
  - Communist-controlled China (1927–1949)
  - Tibet (1912–1951)
  - Mongolian People's Republic
- Sino-German cooperation (1926–1941)
- Diplomatic history of World War II
- Nanjing decade

== Notes ==
Preceded by Beiyang government (1912–1928)	Nationalist government 1927–1948	Succeeded by Government of the Republic of China (1948–present)
