= Commanders of World War II =

List of leading WWII commanders

The Commanders of World War II were for the most part career officers. They were forced to adapt to new technologies and forged the direction of modern warfare. Some political leaders, particularly those of the principal dictatorships involved in the conflict, Adolf Hitler (Germany), Benito Mussolini (Italy), and Hirohito (Japan), acted as dictators for their respective countries or empires.

== Military commanders ==
=== Allied Forces ===
==== United Kingdom ====
Armed Force	Name	Highest Rank	Highest Award	Commands	Fate	Theatres / Battles
Army	Alan Brooke	Field Marshal	Knight of the Garter.	Commander-in-Chief, Home Forces Chief of the Imperial General Staff	Served as CIGS.	Chief of the Imperial General Staff; Battle of the Ypres-Comines Canal; Operation Aerial
Army	Alan Brooke	Commanded the II Corps of the British Expeditionary Force at the Battle of France. Later served as the Chief of the Imperial General Staff.				
Army	Bernard Montgomery	Field Marshal	Knight of the Garter.	General Officer Commanding, 3rd Infantry Division General Officer Commanding, II Corps General Officer Commanding, V Corps General Officer Commanding, XII Corps General Officer Commanding-in-Chief South-Eastern Command General Officer Commanding-in-Chief, Eighth Army Supreme Commander, Allied Ground Forces (Normandy) General Officer Commanding-in-Chief 21st Army Group General Officer Commanding-in-Chief, British Army of the Rhine and Military Governor of British Occupation Zone in Germany	Served as CIGS, and later Commander-in-Chief of the Western Union and Deputy Supreme Allied Commander Europe in NATO.	Western Desert Campaign; Battle of Alam el Halfa; Second Battle of El Alamein; Battle of El Agheila; Tunisia Campaign; Battle of Medenine; Operation Pugilist; Battle of Wadi Akarit; Operation Husky; Operation Avalanche; Western Front (World War II); Operation Overlord; Battle for Caen; Operation Epsom; Operation Goodwood; Operation Cobra; Falaise pocket; Operation Market Garden; Battle of the Bulge; Western Allied invasion of Germany
Army	Bernard Montgomery	A veteran of World War I and the Irish War of Independence, entered the Second World War as a divisional commander within the British Expeditionary Force, defending France and then took command of II Corps during the evacuation at Dunkirk. After several Corps appointments was placed in command of South-Eastern Command before being dispatched to Egypt to take command of the Eighth Army, following the death of William Gott. Won the Second Battle of El Alamein and played a crucial role in the completion of the North African Campaign. Then led the Eighth Army during the Battle of Sicily and then the invasion of Italy itself. Was transferred back to the United Kingdom to take command of the 21st Army Group and led all Allied ground forces during Operation Overlord. Following the conclusion of this campaign, relinquishing the role of Ground Forces commander, he continued to lead 21st Army Group throughout the rest of the 1944-1945 North West Europe Campaign.				
Army	Harold Alexander	Field Marshal	Knight Grand Cross of the Most Honourable Order of the Bath	General Officer Commanding, 1st Infantry Division General Officer Commanding, I Corps General Officer Commanding-in-Chief, Southern Command General Officer Commanding, XII Corps General Officer Commanding-in-Chief, South-Eastern Command General Officer Commanding-in-Chief, Middle East Command General Officer Commanding-in-Chief, 18th Army Group General Officer Commanding-in-Chief, 15th Army Group Supreme Commander Allied Forces Headquarters	Governor General of Canada	Battle of Dunkirk; Mediterranean and Middle East Theatre; Adriatic Campaign of World War II; North African Campaign; Battle of Tunisia; Italian Campaign (World War II)
Army	Harold Alexander	The last British soldier to evacuate Dunkirk, replaced Auchinleck from command at North Africa, and turned the tide in the Allies' favour. Defeated the Germans in North Africa. Staged a successful invasion of Italy, and as Commander-in-Chief of Allied Forces liberated it in 1944 before becoming Supreme Commander of the Allied Forces Headquarters, responsible for all military operations in the Mediterranean Theatre.				
Army	Archibald Wavell	Field Marshal	Knight Grand Cross of the Order of the Bath	General Officer Commanding-in-Chief, Middle East Command Commander-in-Chief, India Supreme Commander, American-British-Dutch-Australian Command Governor-General of India	Viceroy of India, returned to England in 1947 and became High Steward of Colchester and a Lord Temporal	Mediterranean and Middle East Theatre; Adriatic Campaign of World War II; North African campaign; East African Campaign; Anglo-Iraqi War; Syria–Lebanon Campaign; Burma Campaign 1942–43
Army	Archibald Wavell	Commander-in-Chief of British Forces in the Middle East 1939–1941. Commander-in-Chief in India 1941–1942. Commander of ABDACOM 1942. Commander-in-Chief in India 1942–1943. Viceroy of India 1943–1947.				
Army	Viscount Gort	Field Marshal	Holder of the Victoria Cross.	General Officer Commanding-in-Chief, British Expeditionary Force Governor of Gibraltar Governor of Malta High Commissioner for Palestine and Trans-Jordan	Died in 1946.	Western Front (World War II); Battle of France; Battle of Dunkirk
Army	Viscount Gort	A World War I hero, he played a major role in mobilising and arming the British forces during the Phony War. He took command of the British Expeditionary Force for the German invasion of France but was overwhelmed by German military tactics. When his troops were trapped in Dunkirk, he disobeyed orders from French and British command to attack and decided to evacuate, a decision which saved the lives of over 300,000 soldiers.				
Army	Claude Auchinleck	General	Order of the Bath	General Officer Commanding, IV Corps Commander-in-Chief, Northern Norway Governor of Malta General Officer Commanding, V Corps General Officer Commanding-in-Chief, Southern Command General Officer Commanding-in-Chief, Middle East Command Commander-in-Chief, India	Commander-in-Chief, India during the Partition of India	Mediterranean and Middle East theatre of World War II; Adriatic Campaign of World War II; North African Campaign; Anglo-Iraqi War; Operation Crusader; Battle of Gazala; First Battle of El Alamein
Army	Claude Auchinleck	Organised the Home Guard to protect against Operation Sea Lion. A quick response to the Iraq revolt impressed Churchill, who appointed him Commander-in-Chief of the North Africa forces. Frequent disagreements with British command, coupled with significant loss of territory against Rommel, forced him to be reassigned back to India. He fared better in this theatre, successfully mobilising the British Indian Army against the Burma invasion.				
Air Force	Charles Portal	Marshal of the Royal Air Force	Knight of the Garter	Air Member for Personnel Air Officer Commanding-in-Chief, RAF Bomber Command Chief of the Air Staff	Chairman of atomic energy division of Ministry of Supply, British Aluminium, and British Aircraft Corporation.	Chief of Air Staff; Adlertag; Strategic bombing during World War II
Air Force	Charles Portal	Strong advocate of area bombing. Took over as head of the RAF after the Battle of Britain. Continually launched air raids against Germany, especially targeting civilian populations, and helped create Pathfinder forces.				
Air Force	Arthur Harris	Air Chief Marshal	Knight Grand Cross of the Order of the Bath	Air Officer Commanding-in-Chief, RAF Bomber Command	Manager of the South African Marine Corporation	Strategic bombing during World War II; Combined Bomber Offensive; Pointblank directive; Battle of the Ruhr; Bombing of Kassel in World War II; Battle of Berlin (RAF campaign)
Air Force	Arthur Harris	Assisted Charles Portal in the strategic bombing campaign against Germany, issued the area bombing directive				
Air Force	Hugh Dowding	Air Chief Marshal	Knight Grand Cross of the Order of the Bath	Air Officer Commanding-in-Chief, RAF Fighter Command	Dismissed as head of fighter command in November 1940. Became a theosophist after the war. Died in February 1970, aged 87 and buried in Westminster Abbey.	Battle of Britain
Air Force	Hugh Dowding	Leader in World War I of a Royal Flying Corps squadron. Commander of the Battle of Britain. Credited with saving Britain from defeat by devising the Dowding system				
Navy	Andrew Cunningham	Admiral of the Fleet	Knight of the Thistle	Commander-in-Chief, Mediterranean Fleet First Sea Lord and Chief of the Naval Staff	Served as Lord High Commissioner to the General Assembly of the Church of Scotland. Died in June 1963, buried at sea off Portsmouth.	French West Africa in World War II; Battle of the Mediterranean; Battle of Calabria; Battle of Taranto; Battle of Cape Matapan; Siege of Malta (World War II); Operation Torch; Operation Retribution (1943); Operation Husky
Navy	Andrew Cunningham	First Sea Lord 1943–1946.				
Navy	Louis Mountbatten	Admiral of the Fleet	Knight of the Garter	Commanded HMS Kelly and HMS Illustrious Commander-in-Chief, Combined Operations Headquarters Supreme Allied Commander, South East Asia Command	Viceroy of India until 1947. First Sea Lord from 1954 to 1957.	Battle of Dieppe; South-East Asian theatre of World War II; Burma Campaign; Operation Tiderace
Navy	Louis Mountbatten	Supreme Allied Commander of SEAC. Under him were such generals as William Slim and Joseph Stilwell.				
Navy	Sir Alfred Pound	Admiral of the Fleet	Knight Grand Cross of the Order of the Bath	First Sea Lord and Chief of the Naval Staff	Died of illness, October 1943.	Battle of the Atlantic
Navy	Sir Alfred Pound	First Sea Lord 1939–1943.				
Navy	James Somerville	Admiral of the Fleet	Knight Grand Cross of the Order of the Bath	Commander-in-Chief, East Indies Station Commander-in-Chief, Battlecruiser Squadron Supreme Allied Commander, Force H Commander-in-Chief, Eastern Fleet	Became Lord Lieutenant of Somerset in August 1946.	Attack on Mers-el-Kébir; Battle of Cape Spartivento; Indian Ocean raid

==== France ====
Armed Force	Name	Highest Rank	Highest Award	Commands	Fate	Theatres / Battles
Army	Charles de Gaulle	Général de Brigade	Grand Master Legion of Honor	Commander, 4th Armored Division Leader of the Free French Forces Chairman of the Provisional Government of the French Republic	Took control of France as President and was instrumental in creating the Provisional Government of the French Republic and later the Fifth French Republic.	Battle of France; Battle of Montcornet; Battle of Abbeville; West African Campaign; Battle of Dakar; Battle of Gabon; Free French Forces
Army	Charles de Gaulle	Defied Vichy France by vowing to continue fighting after the French surrender. He headed with de Tassigny the Free French Forces, who assisted the Allies in the liberation of France in 1944.				
Army	Jean de Lattre de Tassigny	Marshal of France	Grand Master Legion of Honor	Commander, First Army Commander-in-Chief, Ground Forces in Western Europe	Later commanded the French Far East Expeditionary Corps in the First Indochina War.	Invasion of Elba; Operation Dragoon; Colmar Pocket; French Resistance
Army	Jean de Lattre de Tassigny	Defied Vichy France by vowing to continue fighting after the French surrender. He headed with Charles de Gaulle the Free French Forces, who assisted the Allies in the liberation of France in 1944.				
Army	Alphonse Juin	Marshal of France	Grand Cross Legion of Honor	Commander, 15th Motorized Infantry Division Commander, French Expeditionary Corps Chief of the Defence Staff	Became Resident General in Morocco and member of the Académie Française, Allied Joint Force Commander Brunssum in NATO	Winter Line
Army	Alphonse Juin	Commander of the Vichy French forces in North Africa until 1942, then commander of the French Expeditionary Corps in Tunisia and Italy.				
Army	Maurice Gamelin	Général d'Armée	Grand Cross Legion of Honor	Chief of Staff of the French Army	Died in 1958.	Saar Offensive; Battle of Belgium; Battle of France; Battle of Sedan (1940)
Army	Maurice Gamelin	Commander-in-Chief of French army during Battle of France, was replaced on 20 May 1940.				
Army	Maxime Weygand	Général d'armée	Grand Cross Legion of Honor	Chief of Staff of the French Army Minister of National Defence	Arrested on charges of treason but acquitted.	Battle of Belgium; Battle of France; Battle of Abbeville; Battle of Dunkirk
Army	Maxime Weygand	Commander-in-Chief of French army during the Battle of France from 20 May 1940 until the surrender of France. Oversaw the creation of the Weygand line, an early application of the Hedgehog tactic.				
French Navy	François Darlan	Admiral of the Fleet	War Cross	Chief of Staff of the French Navy High Commissioner for France in North and West Africa	Assassinated by Fernand Bonnier de La Chapelle December 1942.	North African Campaign; Mers-el-Kébir; Operation Torch
French Navy	François Darlan	Built up the French Navy to prepare for war, only to see it destroyed by the British Navy. Served the Vichy France government and was tipped to become Pétain's successor. Was commander of Vichy French forces in Operation Torch. After arranging a ceasefire, he defected to the Allied side.				

==== United States ====
Armed Force	Name		Highest Rank	Highest Award	Command	Fate	Theatres / Battles
Army	George Marshall		General of the Army	Distinguished Service Medal, Silver Star	Chief of Staff of the United States Army	As United States Secretary of State his name was given to the Marshall Plan, for which he was awarded the Nobel Peace Prize in 1953. Also served as Secretary of Defense during the Korean War.	Chief of Staff of the United States Army
Army	George Marshall	Was the aide to General John J. Pershing after World War I. Was Chief of Staff having overall command of the US Army during and before World War II. Marshall served as the U.S. Army Chief of Staff during the war and as the chief military adviser to President Franklin D. Roosevelt. Many of the American generals that were given top commands during the war were either picked or recommended by Marshall, including Dwight Eisenhower, Lloyd Fredendall, Lesley J. McNair, Mark W. Clark and Omar Bradley. He led the rapid growth of US forces, co-ordinated the Western Allies and promoted postwar reconstruction of Europe.					
Army	Dwight D. Eisenhower		General of the Army	Army Distinguished Service Medal, Navy Distinguished Service Medal.	Commanding General, European Theater of Operations Supreme Commander Allied Expeditionary Force Military Governor of the U.S. Occupation Zone in Germany	After liberating Europe, served as Army Chief of Staff, president of Columbia University, and Supreme Commander of NATO before being elected the 34th President of the United States.	Mediterranean and Middle East theatre of World War II; Adriatic Campaign of World War II; North African Campaign; Italian Campaign (World War II); Western Front (World War II); Western Allied invasion of Germany
Army		In December 1943, President Roosevelt decided that Eisenhower—not Marshall—would be Supreme Allied Commander in Europe. The following month, he resumed command of European Theater of Operations United States Army (ETOUSA) and the following month was officially designated as the Supreme Allied Commander of the Supreme Headquarters Allied Powers Europe (SHAPE), serving in a dual role until the end of hostilities in Europe in May 1945. He was charged in these positions with planning and carrying out the Allied assault on the coast of Normandy in June 1944 under the code name Operation Overlord, to head the liberation of Europe on the Western Front and the invasion of Germany.					
Army	Douglas MacArthur		General of the Army	Medal of Honor, Philippine Medal of Valor	United States Military Advisor to the Philippines Commanding General, United States Army Forces in the Far East Supreme Allied Commander, South West Pacific Area Supreme Commander for the Allied Powers	Tasked with rebuilding Japan after the war. Later commanded the United Nations Command in the Korean War, and was controversially dismissed by President Harry S. Truman for considering the use of nuclear weapons against China and North Korea. Considered possible Republican Party candidate in 1952 United States presidential election, and chaired Remington Rand	South West Pacific theatre of World War II; Philippines campaign (1941–1942); Solomon Islands campaign; New Guinea campaign; Salamaua–Lae campaign; Admiralty Islands campaign; Philippines Campaign (1944–45); Borneo campaign (1945); Japan campaign
Army	Douglas MacArthur	Recalled from retirement prior to the start of the Pacific war. Early on in World War II, received the Medal of Honor for extreme bravery. Was disappointed to relinquish the Philippines to the Japanese. Promising to return, he did so in 1945 and while in Manila, prepared for war in Japan itself. MacArthur presided over the Japanese Unconditional Surrender in 1945. His strategy of maneuver, air strikes and force avoidance meant that soldiers under his command faced relatively low casualties.					
Army	Omar Bradley		General of the Army	Distinguished Service Medal (Army and Navy).	Commanding General, 82nd Airborne Division Commanding General, II Corps Commanding General, First Army Commanding General, Twelfth Army Group	Promoted to General of the Army during the Korean War (after serving in the rank of General during World War II). Became Chairman of the Joint Chiefs of Staff.	Battle of Hill 609; Western Front (World War II); Operation Cobra; Operation Lüttich; Falaise pocket; Allied advance from Paris to the Rhine; Battle of Hürtgen Forest; Operation Queen; Battle of the Bulge; Western Allied invasion of Germany
Army	Omar Bradley	This former infantry school instructor entered the war under Patton, later becoming his boss. Towards the end of the war, led a force of over 1.3 million troops (America's largest to serve under one man).					
Army	Mark W. Clark		General	Distinguished Service Medal (Army and Navy).	Commanding General, II Corps Commanding General, Fifth Army Commanding General, Seventh Army Commanding General, 15th Army Group	Commanded the United Nations Command at the end of the Korean War. Served as President of the Citadel from 1954 to 1965.	Allied invasion of Italy; Bernhardt Line; Battle of San Pietro Infine; Battle of Monte Cassino; Operation Shingle; Battle of Cisterna; Gothic Line; Operation Grapeshot
Army	Mark W. Clark	Led the triumphal entry into Rome. Served under General Harold Alexander. Ordered the destruction of the religious abbey at Monte Cassino. Was commander-in-chief in Italy from late 1944.					
Army	George S. Patton, Jr.		General	Distinguished Service Cross	Commanding General, Desert Training Center Commanding General, II Corps Commanding General, Seventh Army Commanding General, First Army Group Commanding General, Third Army Acting Military Governor of U.S. Occupation Zone in Germany Commanding General, Fifteenth Army	Died in a road accident 4 months after the end of the war.	Operation Torch; Battle of El Guettar; Operation Vulcan; Battle of Sicily; Battle of Chambois; Falaise pocket; Battle of Fort Driant; Battle of Metz; Battle of the Bulge
Army	George S. Patton, Jr.	An aggressive general whose ferocious military thrusts earned him admiration and respect from many participants in the war (and at times endangered his military career). Successfully used the German tactic of armored blitzkrieg against the Germans.					
Navy	Ernest King		Fleet Admiral	Navy Cross	Commander-in-Chief, United States Atlantic Fleet Commander-in-Chief, United States Fleet Chief of Naval Operations	Retired on 15 December 1945.	Battle of the Atlantic
Navy	Ernest King	United States Chief of Naval Operations.					
Navy	William D. Leahy	Photograph of Fleet Admiral William D. Leahy, who served as the senior officer of the United States Armed Forces during World War II.	Fleet Admiral	Navy Cross	Chief of Staff to the Commander in Chief	Retired on 2 March 1949.	Chief of Staff to the Commander in Chief
Navy	William D. Leahy	As the Chief of Staff to the Commander in Chief, Leahy was the most senior United States military officer on active duty during the war. Serving as the de facto first Chairman of the Joint Chiefs of Staff, he oversaw all of the American armed forces. He also presided over the American delegation to the Combined Chiefs of Staff. He was a major decision-maker during the war and was second only to the President in authority and influence. Was the first-ever five-star officer in the United States Armed Forces.					
Navy	Chester W. Nimitz		Fleet Admiral	Legion of Honour, Distinguished Service Medal	Commander-in-Chief, United States Pacific Fleet Commander, Pacific Ocean Areas Chief of Naval Operations	Served as Chief of Naval Operations.	Pacific Ocean theatre of World War II; Battle of Midway; Solomon Islands campaign; Philippines Campaign (1944–45); Gilbert and Marshall Islands campaign; Mariana and Palau Islands campaign; Volcano and Ryukyu Islands campaign; Japan campaign
Navy	Chester W. Nimitz	After the attack on Pearl Harbor, took command of the Pacific Ocean areas, and turned around USA's fortunes in the Battle of Midway. Closed the war with operations in the Leyte Gulf and Okinawa.					
Navy	William Halsey, Jr.		Fleet Admiral	Navy Cross	Commander, Carrier Division 2 Commander, South Pacific Area Commander-in-Chief, United States Third Fleet	Retired 1947.	Marshalls–Gilberts raids; Solomon Islands Campaign; Guadalcanal campaign; New Georgia Campaign; Philippines Campaign (1944–45); Bombing of Kure (July 1945)
Navy	William Halsey, Jr.	Commander of South Pacific Area 1942–1944. Commander of United States Third Fleet 1944–1945.					
Navy	Frank Jack Fletcher		Admiral	Medal of Honor	Commander, Task Force 14 Commander, Task Force 17 Commander, Task Force 61 Commander, Northwestern Sea Frontier	Chairman of the General Board, retired in 1947.	Marshalls–Gilberts raids; Battle of Coral Sea; Battle of Midway; Solomon Islands Campaign; Battle of the Eastern Solomons
Navy	Frank Jack Fletcher	Recipient of the Medal of Honor for saving hundreds of refugees during the United States occupation of Veracruz in April 1914 during the Mexican Revolution. Operational commander at the pivotal Battles of Coral Sea and of Midway; nephew of Admiral Frank Friday Fletcher. In November 1942, he became Commander, Thirteenth Naval District and Commander, Northwestern Sea Frontier. Later, he was placed in charge of the Northern Pacific area.					
Navy	Raymond A. Spruance		Admiral	Navy Cross	Commander, Task Force 16 Deputy Commander-in-Chief, United States Pacific Fleet Commander, Central Pacific Force Commander-in-Chief, United States Pacific Fleet and Pacific Ocean Areas	Served as President of the Naval War College.	Battle of Midway; Solomon Islands Campaign; Mariana and Palau Islands campaign; Volcano and Ryukyu Islands campaign; Japan campaign
Navy	Raymond A. Spruance	Commander of two significant battles during the war, Battle of Midway and the Battle of the Philippine Sea.					
USAAF	Henry Arnold		General of the Air Force	Distinguished Service Medal	Chief of the United States Army Air Forces Deputy Chief of Staff for Air		Chief of Staff of the United States Air Force
USAAF	Henry Arnold	Member of the US Joint Chiefs of Staff, and the Combined Chiefs of Staff committees.					
USAAF	Ira C. Eaker		General	Distinguished Service Medal (Army, Navy and Air Force)	Commander, Eighth Air Force Commander of Air Operations, Mediterranean Theater of Operations Deputy Commander of the United States Army Air Forces	Became deputy commander of the Army Air Forces until retirement in 1947.	Interception of the Rex; Operation Cockade; Strategic bombing campaign
USAAF	Ira C. Eaker	Commander of the 8th US Bomber command.					
USAAF	Carl Spaatz		General	Air Force Cross	Commander, Air Combat Command Commander of Air Operations, European Theater Commander, U.S. Strategic Air Forces in Europe Commander, U.S. Strategic Air Forces in the Pacific	Replaced Arnold in September 1947 to become chief of the US Air Force.	Operation Flax; Strategic bombing during World War II; Combined Bomber Offensive; Pointblank directive; Bombing of Kassel in World War II
USAAF	Carl Spaatz	One of the pioneers of US military aviation, Spaatz advocated the use of scientific analysis to bombing raids, and made effective use of long range fighters, tactics which helped the Allies achieve air superiority over Europe.					

==== Soviet Union ====
Armed Force	Name	Highest Rank	Highest Award		Fate	Theatres / Battles
Army	Georgy Zhukov	Marshal of the Soviet Union	Twice an Order of Victory, four times Hero of the Soviet Union	Chief of the General Staff of the Red Army Commander, Reserve Front Commander, Leningrad Front Commander, Southwestern Front Military Governor of Soviet Occupation Zone in Germany	Became Soviet member of the Allied Control Council for Germany, influential in removal of Lavrentiy Beria and selection of Nikita Khrushchev as First Secretary after the death of Joseph Stalin, Minister of Defense of the Soviet Union 1955–57, member of the 20th Presidium of the Communist Party of the Soviet Union 1956-1957	Eastern Front; Operation Barbarossa; Siege of Leningrad; Battle of Moscow; Battles of Rzhev; Operation Mars; Case Blue; Battle of Stalingrad; Battle of Kursk; Dnieper–Carpathian Offensive; Kamenets-Podolsky pocket; Operation Bagration; Vistula–Oder Offensive; Operation Solstice; Battle of Berlin
Army	Georgy Zhukov	Involved in nearly every major battle on the Eastern Front. He successfully led the defense of Moscow and later relieved Leningrad. After vying with Rokossovsky for overall command, he led all Soviet armies in the closing stages of the war and at the Battle for Berlin.				
Army	Aleksandr Vasilevsky	Marshal of the Soviet Union	Twice an Order of Victory, twice Hero of the Soviet Union.	Chief of the General Staff of the Red Army Deputy People's Commissar for Defense of the Soviet Union Commander-in-Chief, Soviet Forces in the Far East	Chief of Staff of the Soviet Army, Soviet Defence Minister	Eastern Front; Operation Barbarossa; Battle of Moscow; Second Battle of Kharkov; Case Blue; Battle of Stalingrad; Operation Bagration; East Prussian Offensive; Manchurian Strategic Offensive Operation; Soviet–Japanese War
Army	Aleksandr Vasilevsky	Stalin's strategic specialist who planned and carried through many successful Soviet operations as overall commander, particularly the encirclement at Stalingrad and the grand plan for Bagration. Commander-in-Chief of Soviet Forces in the Far East during Manchurian Strategic Offensive Operation.				
Army	Konstantin Rokossovsky	Marshal of the Soviet Union, Marshal of Poland	Order of Victory, twice Hero of the Soviet Union.	Commander, 9th Mechanized Corps Commander, 4th Army Commander, 16th Army Commander, Bryansk Front Commander, Don Front Commander, Central Front and 1st Belorussian Front Commander, 2nd Belorussian Front Commander, Northern Group of Forces	Commanded the Northern Group of Forces during the Soviet occupation of Poland and the beginning of the Cold War. Appointed Minister of National Defense of the Communist Polish People's Republic.	Eastern Front; Case Blue; Battle of Stalingrad; Third Battle of Kharkov; Battle of Kursk; Battle of Dnieper; Dnieper–Carpathian Offensive; Operation Bagration; East Prussian Offensive; East Pomeranian Offensive; Battle of Berlin
Army	Konstantin Rokossovsky	Decisive role in the Battle for Moscow, led encirclement forces at Stalingrad, broke German counter-attack at Kursk, advanced into Poland and eventually linked up with the Americans at Wismar.				
Army	Ivan Bagramyan	Marshal of the Soviet Union	Twice Hero of the Soviet Union.	Commander of 1st Baltic Front Commander 3rd Belorussian Front Commander of 16th Army Commander of 11th Guards Army Commander of Baltic Military District	Soviet Army commander	Eastern Front; Operation Barbarossa; Battle of Rostov; Battle of Moscow; Second Battle of Kharkov; Battle of Kursk; Operation Bagration; Baltic Offensive; Courland Pocket; East Prussian Offensive; Battle of Memel; Battle of Königsberg
Army	Ivan Bagramyan	Bagramyan's experience in military planning as a chief of staff allowed him to distinguish himself as a capable commander in the early stages of the Soviet counter-offensives against Nazi Germany.				
Army	Boris Shaposhnikov	Marshal of the Soviet Union	Three Orders of Lenin	Chief of the General Staff of the Red Army Deputy People's Commissar for Defense	Commandant of the Voroshilov Military Academy. Died in 1945.	Pre-emptive war
Army	Boris Shaposhnikov	Chief of the General Staff 1937–1940, 1941–1942. Organized pre-war buildup of the Red Army.				
Army	Nikolai Vatutin	General of the Army	Hero of the Soviet Union	Commander, Voronezh Front Commander, Southwestern Front Commander, 1st Ukrainian Front	Killed by the Ukrainian Insurgent Army.	Eastern Front; Battle of Stalingrad; Third Battle of Kharkov; Battle of Kursk; Battle of Kiev (1943); Dnieper–Carpathian Offensive; Kamenets-Podolsky pocket; Korsun-Cherkassy Pocket
Army	Nikolai Vatutin	Deputy of the Chief of the General Staff of the Red Army. Played a decisive role at Kursk, outmanoeuvered German commander Manstein and later routed German forces in Korsun salient.				
Army	Ivan Konev	Marshal of the Soviet Union	Order of Victory, Twice Hero of the Soviet Union	Commander, 19th Army Commander, Kalinin Front Commander, Western Front Commander, Northwestern Front Commander, 2nd Ukrainian Front Commander, 1st Ukrainian Front Commander, Group of Soviet Occupation Forces in East Germany	Appointed head of the Soviet forces in the Soviet occupation zone of Germany. Served as Commander-in-Chief of the Soviet Armed Forces and Supreme Commander of the Unified Armed Forces of the Warsaw Treaty Organization during the Hungarian Revolution of 1956, the Berlin Crisis of 1961, and the Warsaw Pact invasion of Czechoslovakia	Eastern Front; Battles of Rzhev; Battle of Kursk; Battle of the Dnieper; Battle of Kiev (1943); Dnieper–Carpathian Offensive; Kamenets-Podolsky pocket; Uman–Botoşani Offensive; First Jassy–Kishinev Offensive; Lvov–Sandomierz Offensive; Battle of the Dukla Pass; Vistula-Oder Offensive; Battle of Berlin; Prague Offensive
Army	Ivan Konev	Played a pivotal role in the War, retaking much of Eastern Europe. Helped in the capture of Berlin, the capital of Nazi Germany. Konev was also a competitor of Marshal Georgy Zhukov.				
Army	Semyon Timoshenko	Marshal of the Soviet Union	Order of Victory, Twice Hero of the Soviet Union.	Commander, Kiev Military District Commander, Ukrainian Front Commander, Leningrad Military District People's Commissar of Defense of the Soviet Union Commander, Western Front Commander, Southwestern Front Commander, Northwestern Front	Commanded the Belorussian Military District (Soviet Armed Forces in the Byelorussian Soviet Socialist Republic)	Invasion of Poland; Winter War; Battle of Summa; Eastern Front; Operation Barbarossa; Battle of Smolensk (1941); Second Battle of Kharkov; Case Blue
Army	Semyon Timoshenko	Defence Commissar till 19 July 1941. Chairman of the Stavka (Soviet High Command). A capable commander in the early stages of World War II. Played a decisive role in the Winter War and the invasion of Poland. After the defeat at Kharkov, Timoshenko was removed by Stalin from front-line command but given overall command in different fronts of the USSR.				
Soviet Navy	Ivan Isakov	Admiral of the Fleet of the Soviet Union	Hero of the Soviet Union	Chief-of-Staff of the Soviet Navy	Chief of Staff of the Soviet Navy, Deputy People's Commissar of the Navy	Eastern Front; Baltic Sea campaigns; Battle of the Caucasus
Soviet Navy	Nikolay Kuznetsov	Admiral of the Fleet of the Soviet Union	Hero of the Soviet Union	People's Commissar of the Navy	People's Commissar of the Navy during The Second World War	Eastern Front; Yalta conference
Soviet Navy	Ivan Yumashev	Admiral	Hero of the Soviet Union	Commander-in-Chief, Pacific Fleet	Commander of Soviet Pacific Fleet	Pacific War; Soviet–Japanese War
Soviet Aviation	Sergei Khudyakov	Marshal of Aviation of the Soviet Union	Order of Lenin	Chief of Staff of the Soviet Air Force	Chief of Staff of the Soviet Air Force, deputy commander of the Air Force	Eastern Front; Battle of Moscow; Battles of Rzhev; Battle of Kursk; Yalta conference; Manchurian Strategic Offensive Operation; Soviet–Japanese War
Soviet Aviation	Alexander Novikov	Chief Marshal of Aviation of the Soviet Union	Two times Hero of the Soviet Union	Chief of Staff of the Soviet Air Force	Commander of the Air Forces of the Soviet Union Chief of the High school of civil aviation	Eastern Front; Operation Barbarossa; Battle of Kursk; Battle of Stalingrad; Pacific War
Soviet Aviation	Alexander Golovanov	Chief Marshal of Aviation of the Soviet Union		Commander, 18th Air Army Commander, Long Range Aviation	Commander of the Long Range Aviation	Eastern Front

==== Australia ====
Armed Force	Name	Highest Rank held during World War II	Highest Award	Command	Fate	Theatres / Battles
Army	Vernon Sturdee	Lieutenant General	Knight Commander of the Order of the British Empire	Chief of the General Staff General Officer Commanding, First Army	Sturdee served as the Chief of General Staff and commanded the First Australian Army (1939-1945).; On 6 September 1945 he was the senior Allied officer present at the surrender of Japanese Forces in Rabaul in the South West Pacific theatre.; On 1 December 1945 Sturdee was appointed Commander in Chief of the Australian Military Forces, overseeing the demobilisation of the wartime army. He was mentioned in despatches for a third time on 6 March 1947.	Dutch East Indies campaign; Aitape–Wewak campaign; New Britain campaign; Bougainville Campaign
Army	Brudenell White	General	Knight Commander of the Order of the Bath	Chief of the General Staff	Killed in the Canberra air disaster, 1940.	Chief of the General Staff
Army	Brudenell White	Chief of the General Staff (March–August 1940)				
Army	Thomas Blamey	General	Knight Grand Cross of the Order of the British Empire	General Officer Commanding, Second Australian Imperial Force General Officer Commanding, I Corps Commander-in-Chief of the Australian Military Forces Commander of Allied Land Forces, South West Pacific Area	Promoted to Field Marshal in 1950. Became an author and promoted welfare of ex-servicemen.	Mediterranean and Middle East theatre of World War II; Battle of Greece; South West Pacific theatre of World War II; New Guinea campaign; Kokoda Track campaign; Battle of Wau; Landing at Nadzab
Army	Thomas Blamey	Commander-in-chief of Australian Armed Forces and commander-in-chief of Allied Land Forces in the South West Pacific Area.				
Army	Edmund Herring	Lieutenant General	Knight Commander of the Order of the British Empire	General Officer Commanding, 6th Division General Officer Commanding, 7th Military District General Officer Commanding, Northern Territory Force General Officer Commanding, II Corps General Officer Commanding, New Guinea Force General Officer Commanding, I Corps	Later Chief Justice of Australia. Received KCMG in 1949.	South West Pacific theatre of World War II; Kokoda Track campaign; Landing at Nadzab; Battle of Buna–Gona
Army	Edmund Herring	Commander of Australian forces in the Kokoda Track campaign.				
Army	Leslie Morshead	Lieutenant General	Knight Commander of the Order of the Bath	General Officer Commanding, 18th Infantry Brigade General Officer Commanding, 9th Division General Officer Commanding, II Corps General Officer Commanding, New Guinea Force General Officer Commanding, Second Army General Officer Commanding, I Corps	Became General Manager of the Orient Steam Navigation Company.	Western Desert Campaign; Siege of Tobruk; Battle of Sio; South West Pacific theatre of World War II; Borneo campaign
Army	Leslie Morshead	Led the Australian defence against Rommel's in siege of Tobruk. Commander at the Battle of El Alamein. Australia forces took 22 percent of the casualties there. After learning the art of jungle warfare, he became the commander of operations against the Japanese in New Guinea.				
Air Force	Charles Burnett	Air Chief Marshal	Knight Commander of the Order of the Bath	Inspector-General of the Royal Air Force Chief of Staff of the Royal Australian Air Force	RAF officer loaned to Australia and served as Chief of the Air Staff from 1940 to 1942. Oversaw a 20-fold increase in the size of the RAAF which supported the Empire Air Training Scheme. Returned to Great Britain in 1942 and while suffering poor health worked in the RAF's cadet organisation, the Air Training Corps. Died of a coronary thrombosis months before the end of the War.	Chief of Air Force
Air Force	Charles Burnett	Fighter ace during the First World War. Deputy Commander of RAF in the Middle East.				
Air Force	Peter Roy Maxwell Drummond	Air Marshal	Knight Commander of the Order of the Bath	Deputy Air Officer Commanding-in-Chief RAF Middle East Air Member for Training	Died in an air crash at sea, 1945.	Air Officer Commanding-in-Chief Middle East
Air Force	Peter Roy Maxwell Drummond	Fighter ace during the First World War. Deputy Commander of RAF in the Middle East.				
Navy	John Gregory Crace	Vice Admiral	Knight Commander of the Order of the British Empire	Commander, ANZAC Squadron Commander, Task Force 44	Commanded Chatham Dockyard in Britain.	Pacific Ocean theatre of World War II; Battle of the Coral Sea
Navy	John Gregory Crace	Commanded the Australian navy in the Battle of the Coral Sea. Commander of the Allied Naval Squadron, ANZAC Force.				

==== Canada ====
Armed Force	Name	Highest Rank	Highest Award		Fate	Theatres / Battles
Army	Harry Crerar	General	Order of the Companions of Honour	General Officer Commanding, 2nd Canadian Infantry Division General Officer Commanding, I Canadian Corps General Officer Commanding-in-Chief, First Canadian Army Chief of Staff of the Canadian Army	Became a diplomat, postings in Czechoslovakia, Netherlands and Japan.	Operation Tractable; Falaise pocket; Operation Astonia; Siege of Dunkirk (1944–45); Battle of the Scheldt; Operation Veritable
Army	Harry Crerar	De facto commander-in-chief of the Canadian military.				
Army	Rod Keller	Major General	Commander of the Order of the British Empire			
Army	Guy Simonds	Lieutenant General	Companion of the Order of Canada	General Officer Commanding, 1st Canadian Infantry Division General Officer Commanding, II Canadian Corps General Officer Commanding-in-Chief, First Canadian Army	In 1951 he was appointed Chief of the General Staff	Operation Atlantic; Battle of Verrières Ridge; Operation Spring; Operation Totalize; Operation Tractable; Battle of the Scheldt; Operation Infatuate
Army	Guy Simonds	Devised the Kangaroo armoured personnel carrier.				
Army	Andrew McNaughton	Lieutenant General	Order of the Companions of Honour	General Officer Commanding, 1st Canadian Infantry Division General Officer Commanding, VII Corps General Officer Commanding, Canadian Corps General Officer Commanding, I Canadian Corps General Officer Commanding, 2nd Canadian Infantry Division Minister of National Defence of Canada	First President of the United Nations Security Council	Minister of National Defense
Army	Andrew McNaughton	A noteworthy scientist and inventor of a direction finding device for artillery, a precursor to Radar. Fought in Vimy Ridge during World War I and was a lieutenant colonel. Commander of the Canadian troops until 1943. Was defeated in the Dieppe Raid. Opposed the breaking up of the Canadian Army, and insisted it fight as a single unit. Grandfather of Lieutenant-General Andrew Leslie of Canada.				
Air Force	George Croil	Air Marshal	Commander of the Most Excellent Order of the British Empire	Chief of the Air Staff of the Royal Canadian Air Force Inspector-General of the Royal Canadian Air Force	Died in 1959 in Vancouver, British Columbia.	Defence of Canada; Overseas operations
Air Force	George Croil	Croil succeeded in obtaining the RCAF's independence from the Army just before the war. He was Chief of the Air Staff from 1938 to 1940 and Inspector-General of the Royal Canadian Air Force from 1940 to 1944.				
Air Force	Lloyd Samuel Breadner	Air Chief Marshal	Companion of the Order of the Bath	Chief of the Air Staff of the Royal Canadian Air Force Air Officer Commanding-in-Chief, RCAF Overseas	Retired after the war. Died in 1952 in Boston, Massachusetts.	Defence of Canada; Overseas operations
Air Force	Lloyd Samuel Breadner	A decorated Royal Naval Air Service pilot in World War I, Breadner served as Chief of the Air Staff from 1940 to 1943 and Air Officer Commanding-in-Chief RCAF Overseas from 1944 to 1945. He was one of only two Canadian air chief marshals, the other being Frank Robert Miller.				

==== South Africa ====
Armed Force	Name	Highest Rank held during World War II	Highest Award	Command	Fate	Theatres / Battles
Army	Evered Poole	Major-General	Companion of the Order of the Bath	General Service Officer Grade 1, 1st Infantry Division General Service Officer Grade 1, 2nd Infantry Division General Officer Commanding, 2nd Infantry Brigade General Officer Commanding, 6th Armoured Division General Officer Commanding, South African Forces in Allied Central Mediterranean Force	Passed over as Chief of Staff in 1948 by the newly elected National Party. Posted as head of the South African military mission in Berlin, before embarking on a successful diplomatic career. In 1960, he became ambassador to Greece.	Western Desert Campaign; Italian Campaign
Army	Evered Poole	Commanded the 6th Armoured Division upon its formation in February 1943, and led the division throughout the Italian campaign until 1945. He was among the very few South Africans to be invested as a Commander of the United States Legion of Merit, and was invested as a Commander of the French Legion of Honour. He also received the French Croix de Guerre.				
Army	Dan Pienaar	Major-General	Companion of the Order of the Bath	General Officer Commanding, 1st Infantry Brigade General Officer Commanding, 1st Infantry Division General Officer Commanding, 5th Infantry Brigade General Officer Commanding, 2nd Infantry Division	Killed in an air crash near Lake Victoria, Kenya on his way back to South Africa in December 1942. Pienaar was arguably one of South Africa's most charismatic and popular military commanders. An infantry regiment, the exhibition hall at the South African National Museum of Military History and a suburb of his home town, Bloemfontein, were later named after him.	East African Campaign; Western Desert Campaign
Army	Dan Pienaar	Fought in the East African Campaign, and led the 1st South African Infantry Division in the Western Desert. He was recorded by the press after El Alamein as saying, "Rommel will not get to Alexandria, he will not get the Canal, and he will never dine in Cairo - unless as a tourist."				
Army	George Brink	General	Companion of the Order of the Bath	General Officer Commanding, 1st Infantry Division General Officer Commanding-in-Chief, Inland Area Command	Declared unfit for field duty and recalled to South Africa. Although he retired from the military in 1946, Brink led South Africa's demobilisation efforts from 1944 to 1948.	East African Campaign; Western Desert Campaign
Army	George Brink	From 1940, Brink commanded the 1st South African Division during the East African Campaign, and later commanded the division during the Western Desert Campaign in North Africa. In 1942, Brink turned over command of the division to Dan Pienaar after being declared unfit for field duty due to a back injury.				
Army	Hendrik Klopper	General	Distinguished Service Order	General Officer Commanding, 3rd Infantry Brigade General Officer Commanding, 2nd Infantry Division	Escaped from captivity in 1943 and was later exonerated by a 1942 Court of Inquiry into the Tobruk disaster, however, Klopper never commanded in the field again. Officer Commanding the South African Army College from 1944 to 1945, before being appointed in command of Northern Command in 1945. From 1951 to 1953, Klopper served as Army Chief of Staff, as Inspector-General from 1953 to 1956, and as Commandant General of the Union Defence Force from 1956 to 1958.	Western Desert Campaign
Army	Hendrik Klopper	Briefly commanded the 2nd South African Infantry Division from May to June 1942, and was tasked as Fortress Commander of Tobruk. Forced to surrender the Tobruk garrison to Axis forces, with over 30,000 British and Commonwealth troops being taken prisoner. Klopper later escaped from captivity in 1943 and returned to South Africa.				
Army	Isaac Pierre de Villiers	Major-General	Companion of the Order of the Bath	General Officer Commanding, 2nd Infantry Division	Retired in 1945, became Chairman of the Immigrants Selection Board from 1946 to 1948.	Western Desert Campaign
Army	Isaac Pierre de Villiers	Commanded the 2nd South African Infantry Division between 1940 and 1942, later overseeing Coastal Area Command in South Africa until 1945. Relinquished command of the 2nd SA Division just one month before the Fall of Tobruk where over 10,000 South Africans were taken prisoner by Axis forces.				
Air Force	Pierre van Ryneveld	General	Knight Commander of the Order of the British Empire	Chief of the General Staff of the Union Defence Force Founder of the South African Air Force	Retired in 1949 after serving as CGS for sixteen years, including the whole of the Second World War. The Pretoria suburb of Pierre van Ryneveld Park was named in his honour and the airport just north of Upington in the Northern Cape is also named after Van Ryneveld. Sir Pierre van Ryneveld High School is in Kempton Park, Gauteng. The SAAF's annual air power symposium, is known as the Sir Pierre Van Ryneveld Air Power Symposium.	Chief of the General Staff
Air Force	Pierre van Ryneveld	Established the SAAF in 1920 and directed it until 1933, when he was promoted to Chief of the General Staff (CGS), in command of the Union Defence Forces. However, for the next four years, the SAAF remained under Van Ryneveld's direct control as no one was appointed as the Air Force's director until 1937.				
Air Force	Jimmy Durrant	Major-General	Companion of the Order of the Bath	Officer Commanding, No. 40 Squadron SAAF Officer Commanding, No. 24 Squadron SAAF Officer Commanding, No. 205 Group RAF Air Officer Commanding, No. 231 Group SAAF	In 1946, he became Director-General of the South African Air Force and qualified on a special course at the Imperial Defence College in 1951. He resigned from the SAAF as a result of the de-anglicisation policy instituted by the National Party after they took power after the 1948 general election.	East African Campaign; North African Campaign; Far East Campaign
Air Force	Jimmy Durrant	Appointed officer commanding of No. 40 Squadron SAAF, which he commanded in East Africa from May 1940 to September 1941 when was promoted lieutenant-colonel and appointed officer commanding 24 Squadron SAAF. He commanded this squadron throughout the bitter fighting in the Western Desert Campaign in 1941–42. Later promoted colonel and given command of 3 (Bomber) Wing SAAF in North Africa, Sicily and Italy. In 1945, he was posted to the Far East as AOC No. 231 Heavy Bomber Group, RAF, with the rank of major-general. At the age of 32, he was the youngest major-general in the Allied forces.				
Navy	Guy Hallifax	Rear Admiral	Order of St Michael and St George		Killed in an air crash at Baboon Point, 74 kilometres (46 mi) north of Saldanha while returning from a tour of inspection to the newly established naval detachment in Walvis Bay in March 1941.	South African Coastal Defence
Navy	Guy Hallifax	Instrumental in overseeing large-scale industrial and administrative expansion of the South African Navy between 1939 and 1941, as well as assuming operational responsibility from the Royal Navy for the first time.				

==== New Zealand ====
Armed Force	Name	Highest Rank held during World War II	Highest Award	Command	Fate	Theatres / Battles
Army	Bernard Freyberg, 1st Baron Freyberg	Lieutenant General	Knight Grand Cross of the Order of St Michael and St George, Distinguished Service Order; Holder of the Victoria Cross plus three other Distinguished Service Orders (World War I)	General Officer Commanding, New Zealand Expeditionary Force General Officer Commanding, 2nd New Zealand Division	Returned to New Zealand and later became Governor-General of New Zealand	Battle of Greece; Battle of Thermopylae (1941); Battle of Crete; North African Campaign; Tunisia Campaign; Italian Campaign (World War II)
Army	Bernard Freyberg, 1st Baron Freyberg	A veteran of the Mexican Revolution and Victoria Cross recipient during the First World War. First soldier on beach for the Battle of Gallipoli during the First World War and the youngest general in the British Army during the First World War. He liked to be in the thick of action—Churchill called him "the Salamander" due to his love of fire. Involved in the defeat in the Battle of Greece. Again defeated as the Allied Commander in the Battle of Crete after Churchill failed to provide enigma intelligence. Very successful as a commander in various campaigns in the North African Campaign, including the Battle of El Alamein. Defeated again at the First Battle of Cassino as a Corps Commander. Relieved Padua and Venice, and was first to enter Trieste in the race for Trieste, and successfully confronted Josip Broz Tito's Partisans there. By the end of World War II, Freyberg had spent ten and a half years fighting the Germans during both the second and first world wars.				
Air Force	Arthur Coningham	Air Marshal	Knight Commander of the Order of the Bath	Air Officer Commanding, No. 4 Group RAF Air Officer Commanding-in-Chief, Western Desert Air Force Air Officer Commanding-in-Chief, Northwest African Tactical Air Force Air Officer Commanding, RAF Second Tactical Air Force	Missing in Bermuda Triangle.	North African Campaign; Western Desert Campaign; First Battle of El Alamein; Second Battle of El Alamein; Operation Torch; Italian Campaign; North-West Europe Campaign; Normandy campaign
Air Force	Arthur Coningham	A high scoring air ace in World War I. Air force Commander working with famous Major General George Patton during Operation Torch. Commander of tactical Air Forces for Operation Husky and D-Day.				
Air Force	Keith Park	Air Chief Marshal	Knight Grand Cross of the Order of the Bath	Air Officer Commanding, No. 11 Group RAF Air Officer Commanding, No. 23 Group RAF Air Officer Commanding-in-Chief, Air Headquarters Egypt Air Officer Commanding-in-Chief, Air Headquarters Malta Air Officer Commanding-in-Chief, Middle East Command Air Officer Commanding-in-Chief, Air Command South East Asia	Returned to New Zealand.	Battle of France; Battle of Britain; Battle of Malta; Pacific Theatre of Operations
Air Force	Keith Park	A veteran of World War I and air ace. Served under Hugh Dowding and commanded the defense of London during the Luftwaffe attacks. Dowding and Park are credited with winning the Battle of Britain. Led the defense of Malta.				
Air Force	Roderick Carr	Air Marshal	Knight Commander of the Order of the British Empire	Air Officer Commanding, No. 4 Group RAF	Air Officer Commanding Indian Air Force, 1946	Battle of Britain; RAF Bomber Command
Air Force	Roderick Carr	Served in the Royal Naval Air Service during the First World War. Commander of Northern Ireland RAF. Bomber Command Commander 4 Group. Deputy Chief of Staff (Air), SHAEF.				

==== Poland ====
Armed Force	Name	Highest Rank	Highest Award	Command	Fate	Theatres / Battles
Army	Edward Rydz-Śmigły	Marshal of Poland	Order of the White Eagle	General Inspector of the Polish Armed Forces	Suffered heart attack before he could participate in the Polish resistance.	Invasion of Poland; Fighting Poland Movement
Army	Edward Rydz-Śmigły	Was commander-in-chief of Poland during its invasion by German and Russian troops.				
Army	Władysław Sikorski	General	Order of the White Eagle	General Inspector of the Polish Armed Forces Prime Minister of the Polish government-in-exile Commander-in-Chief, Polish Armed Forces in the West	Died in plane crash July 1943.	Polish Armed Forces in the West
Army	Władysław Sikorski	Served as Commander-in-Chief of the Polish government in exile, and formed the Polish Armed Forces.				
Army	Władysław Anders	General	Order of the White Eagle	Commander, Nowogródzka Cavalry Brigade Commander, Anders’ Army Commander, Polish 2nd Corps	Became Inspector-General of the Polish Armed Forces in Exile.	Polish Armed Forces in the East
Army	Władysław Anders	Founder & commander of the Polish Forces Armed in Iran (1942), better known as Anders Army.				
Army	Michał Rola-Żymierski	Marshal of Poland	Order of the Builders of People's Poland	Commander-in-Chief, Polish Armed Forces in the East Minister of National Defense of the Provisional Government of the Republic of Poland	He was a member of the Polish United Workers' Party	Eastern Front (World War II); People's Army of Poland.
Army	Michał Rola-Żymierski	Was commander-in-chief of the Polish Army fighting alongside the Soviet Union.				
Army	Tadeusz Bór-Komorowski	Lieutenant General	Order of the White Eagle	Commander-in-Chief, Home Army	Elected Prime Minister of Polish government in Exile.	Polish Resistance; Warsaw Uprising
Army	Tadeusz Bór-Komorowski	Commanded the main part of the Warsaw Uprising.				
Army	Franciszek Kleeberg	Major General	Virtuti Militari Iron Cross	Commander, Independent Operational Group Polesie	He was one of the officers of the Polish Legion against the Soviets. He was imprisoned in Oflag IV-B Königstein and died in 1941.	Polish–Soviet War; Invasion of Poland; Eastern Front (World War I)
Army	Franciszek Kleeberg	The last remaining Polish General holding the Germans off until the battle of Kock, he had never lost a battle until Kock.				

==== Czechoslovakia ====
Armed Force	Name	Highest Rank	Highest Award	Commands	Fate	Theatres / Battles
Army	Ludvík Svoboda	General	People's Hero of Yugoslavia, Hero of the Soviet Union	Commander-in-Chief, 1st Czechoslovak Army Corps in the Soviet Union	Later president of the Czechoslovak Socialist Republic.	Eastern Front; Battle of Sokolovo; Battle of the Dukla Pass
Army	Ludvík Svoboda	Commander of the Czechoslovak military units on the Eastern front				
Army	Ján Golian	Brigadier General	Czechoslovak War Cross		Executed by the Germans in a concentration camp in Flossenburg.	Slovak National Uprising
Army	Ján Golian	Led the insurgent Slovak Army during the Slovak National Uprising.				

==== Greece ====
Armed Force	Name	Highest Rank	Highest Award	Commands	Fate	Theatres / Battles
Army	Alexander Papagos	Field Marshal	the Commander's Cross of the Cross of Valour	Chief of the Hellenic Army General Staff	Deported to Dachau Concentration Camp, led Greek army in Greek Civil War, later Field Marshal and Prime Minister of Greece.	Greek Resistance
Army	Alexander Papagos	Commander-in-Chief of the Greek Army in 1940–41.				
Army	Napoleon Zervas	Lieutenant Colonel		Commander, National Republican Greek League	Twice minister, died in 1957.	Greek Resistance; Operation Harling
Army	Napoleon Zervas	Commander of the National Republican Greek League resistance army.				
Army	Stefanos Sarafis	Major General		Commander, Greek People's Liberation Army	Later MP for the United Democratic Left, died in a car accident in 1957.	Balkan Campaign (World War II); Greco-Italian War; Capture of Klisura Pass; Italian Spring Offensive; Battle of Greece
Army	Stefanos Sarafis	Founder and chief leader of the Greek People's Liberation Army (ELAS).				
Army	Aris Velouchiotis	Corporal (actual rank); Major of Artillery (assumed rank)		Leader of the National Liberation Front	Committed suicide after the Second World War.	Greek Resistance; Operation Harling
Army	Aris Velouchiotis	Chief military officer of the Greek People's Liberation Army after April 1943.				
Navy	Alexandros Sakellariou	Vice Admiral	the Commander's Cross of the Cross of Valour	Chief of the Hellenic Navy General Staff	MP, Navy and National Defense Minister after the war. Died in 1982.	Battle of the Mediterranean
Navy	Alexandros Sakellariou	Chief of staff of the Royal Hellenic Navy 1940–41, Minister for National Defence, 1951–52				

==== Netherlands ====
Armed Force	Name	Highest Rank	Highest Award	Commands	Fate	Theatres / Battles
Army	Henri Winkelman	General	Military William Order	Chief of Defence of the Netherlands Armed Forces	Died in 1952.	Battle of the Netherlands; Battle of Maastricht; Battle for The Hague; Battle of Zeeland; Battle of Belgium; Battle of France
Army	Henri Winkelman	Was Commander-in-Chief of the Netherlands army during the Battle of the Netherlands.				
Army	Hein ter Poorten	Lieutenant General	Commander-in-Chief, Royal Netherlands East Indies Army Commander, American-British-Dutch-Australian Land Command		He spent the rest of the war in various prisoner of war camps, and in 1945 returned to the Netherlands. Died in 1968.	Netherlands East Indies campaign; Battle of Java island
Army	Hein ter Poorten	Commander of the ABDA land forces in early 1942.				
Navy	Conrad Helfrich	Vice Admiral	Knight Grand Cross of the Order of the Netherlands Lion	Commander of the Royal Netherlands Navy Commander, American-British-Dutch-Australian Sea Command	Died in 1962.	Netherlands East Indies campaign; Battle of the Java Sea
Navy	Conrad Helfrich	Commander of the ABDA Naval forces in 1942.				
Navy	Karel Doorman	Rear admiral	Knight of the Military William Order	Commander, American-British-Dutch-Australian Combined Striking Force	Died in Battle of the Java Sea.	Netherlands East Indies campaign; Battle of Makassar Strait; Battle of Badung Strait; Battle of the Java Sea
Navy	Karel Doorman	Commander of the combined American, British, Dutch and Australian (ABDA) fleet in the Dutch East Indies.				

==== Luxembourg ====
Armed Force	Name	Highest Rank	Highest Award	Commands	Fate	Theatres / Battles
Army	Émile Speller	Major-Commandant	Order of the Oak Crown	Chief of Defence	Arrested by Germany in 1940 following the invasion of Luxembourg but later released, died 17 January 1952	German invasion of Luxembourg

==== Yugoslavia ====
Armed Force	Name	Highest Rank	Highest Award	Commands	Fate	Theatres / Battles
Army	Draža Mihailović	General of the Army	Legion of Merit	Commander of the Chetnik Detachments of Yugoslav Army	Executed by Communists in 1946.	World War II in Yugoslavia; Chetniks
Army	Draža Mihailović	Led the Chetniks.				
Army	Josip Broz Tito	Marshal	Order of the National Hero	President of the League of Communists of Yugoslavia Commander-in-Chief of the Yugoslav Partisans Founder of Democratic Federal Yugoslavia and the Socialist Federal Republic of Yugoslavia	Became President of Yugoslavia	World War II in Yugoslavia; Yugoslav Partisans
Army	Josip Broz Tito	Led the People's Liberation Army.				

Dušan Simović
Milan Nedić

==== China ====
Armed Force	Name	Highest Rank	Highest Award	Commands	Fate	Theatres / Battles
Army	Chiang Kai-shek	Generalissimo	Order of National Glory	Premier of the Republic of China Commander-in-Chief of the National Revolutionary Army Chairman of the Military Affairs Commission Chairman of the Nationalist government	After the war against Japan, resumed Chinese Civil War against the communists. Retreated to Taiwan and led the Kuomintang (KMT) government there until his death.	Supreme Leader of the China Front
Army	Chiang Kai-shek	Was both the head of the Republic of China and the supreme Allied commander in the China Theatre. Led the nation to total war from his temporary capital at Chongqing.				
Army	Yan Xishan	General	Order of Blue Sky and White Sun	Commander of the National Revolutionary Army in Shanxi	Fought on the side of the Republic of China in the civil war.	Second Sino-Japanese War; Operation Chahar; Battle of Taiyuan; Battle of Xinkou
Army	Yan Xishan	Warlord of Shanxi				
Army	Chen Cheng	General	Order of Blue Sky and White Sun	Commander-in-Chief, Chinese Expeditionary Force	Became the Chief of the general staff.	Second Sino-Japanese War; Battle of Shanghai; Battle of Wuhan; 1st Battle of Changsha; Battle of West Hubei; Burma theatre
Army	Zhu De	Marshal of the People's Republic of China	Honour Sabre of the Awakened Lion	Commander-in-Chief, Chinese Red Army Commander, Eighth Route Army	Became the commander-in-chief of the People's Liberation Army.	Second Sino-Japanese War; Battle of Taiyuan; Battle of Pingxingguan; Battle of Xinkou; Hundred Regiments Offensive
Army	Zhu De	Military leader of the Communist Eighth Route Army.				
Army	Xue Yue	General	Order of Blue Sky and White Sun	Commander, 19th Army Group Commander, Eastern Henan Army Commander, 1st Army Corps Commander, 9th Front	Fought on the side of the Republic of China in the civil war.	Second Sino-Japanese War; Battle of Lanfeng; Battle of Wuhan; Battle of Wanjialing; Battle of Nanchang; 1st Battle of Changsha; 1939–40 Winter Offensive; 2nd Battle of Changsha; 3rd Battle of Changsha; Zhejiang-Jiangxi campaign; Battle of Changde; 4th Battle of Changsha
Army	Li Zongren	General	Order of Blue Sky and White Sun	Commander of the KMT Fifth War Zone	Became the Vice President of the Republic of China.	Second Sino-Japanese War; Battle of Taierzhuang; Battle of Wuhan; Battle of Suixian–Zaoyang; Battle of Zaoyang–Yichang; Central Hubei Operation; Battle of South Henan; Western Hubei Operation
Army	Bai Chongxi	General	Order of Blue Sky and White Sun		Became the Minister of National Defence of the Republic of China.	Second Sino-Japanese War; Battle of Taierzhuang; Battle of Wuhan; Battle of South Guangxi; Battle of Henan-Hunan-Guangxi
Navy	Chen Shaokuan	Fleet Admiral	Order of Blue Sky and White Sun	Chief of Navy of the Republic of China Navy	Became the Minister of Navy of the Republic of China, the Vice Governor of Fujian Province of the People's Republic of China	Second Sino-Japanese War; Battle of Jiangyin
Navy	Chen Ce	Admiral	Order of the British Empire			Second Sino-Japanese War; Battle of Humen; Battle of Hong Kong
Navy	Shen Honglie	Admiral	Order of Blue Sky and White Sun			Second Sino-Japanese War; Manchurian Incident; Battle of Shanghai

=== Axis Forces ===
==== Germany ====
Armed Force	Name	Highest Rank	Highest Award	Commands	Fate	Theatres / Battles
Army	Wilhelm Keitel	Field Marshal	Knight's Cross of the Iron Cross	Chief of the Oberkommando der Wehrmacht	Executed in 1946.	Oberkommando der Wehrmacht
Army	Wilhelm Keitel	Chief of the OKW during World War II. Was convicted of war crimes in the Nuremberg Trials and executed by the Allies.				
Army	Alfred Jodl	Colonel General	Knight's Cross of the Iron Cross	Chief of the Operations Staff of the Oberkommando der Wehrmacht	Executed in 1946.	Oberkommando der Wehrmacht
Army	Alfred Jodl	Chief of the Operations Staff of the OKW.				
Army	Heinrich Himmler	Reichsführer-SS	Blood Order, Golden Nazi Party	Reichsfuhrer-SS Reichsleiter Chief of German Police Director of the Reich Security Main Office Reichsminister of the Interior	Chief of the SS during World War II. Suicide, 1945.	Operation Konserve; Operation Nordwind; Colmar Pocket; Western Allied invasion of Germany
Army	Heinrich Himmler	Military commander and a leading member of the Nazi Party (NSDAP) of Nazi Germany. Nazi leader Adolf Hitler later appointed him Commander of the Replacement (Home) Army and General Plenipotentiary for the administration of the entire Third Reich. Himmler was one of the most influential men in Nazi Germany and one of the persons most directly responsible for the Holocaust.				
Army	Walther von Brauchitsch	Field Marshal	Knight's Cross of the Iron Cross	Supreme Commander of the German Army	Died in 1948.	Oberkommando des Heeres; Operation Barbarossa
Army	Walther von Brauchitsch	Commander-in-Chief of the German Army 1938–1941.				
Army	Paul Ludwig Ewald von Kleist	Field Marshal	Knight's Cross with Oak Leaves and Swords	Commander, 1st Panzer Army Commander-in-Chief, Army Group A	Died in 1954 in a Soviet prison. Most senior German officer to die in a Soviet prison.	Invasion of Yugoslavia; Battle of Sedan (1940); Battle of Dunkirk; Battle of Rostov (1941); Battle of Brody (1941); Case Blue; Battle of the Dnieper
Army	Paul Ludwig Ewald von Kleist	An aristocrat and senior commander in World War I. Commander of tank armies in the German Army in World War II. Fought in most of the actions involving blitzkrieg techniques.				
Army	Wilhelm Ritter von Leeb	Field Marshal	Knight's Cross of the Iron Cross	Commander-in-Chief, Army Group C Commander-in-Chief, Army Group North	Died in 1956.	German occupation of Czechoslovakia; Battle of France; Operation Barbarossa; Siege of Leningrad
Army	Wilhelm Ritter von Leeb	Exemplary service in World War I. Given the command of Army Group North in Operation Barbarossa. Was in charge of the unsuccessful siege of Leningrad, which lasted nearly 1000 days.				
Army	Gerd von Rundstedt	Field Marshal	Knight's Cross with Oak Leaves and Swords	Commander-in-Chief, Army Group South Commander-in-Chief, Army Group A Oberbefehlshaber West	Died in 1953.	Invasion of Poland; Battle of Belgium; Battle of France; Battle of Sedan (1940); Battle of Dunkirk; Dunkirk evacuation; Operation Barbarossa; Battle of Uman; Dieppe Raid; Battle of Kiev (1941); Battle of Rostov (1941); Battle of Normandy; Allied advance from Paris to the Rhine; Operation Market Garden; Battle of the Bulge; Western Allied invasion of Germany; Pointe du Hoc
Army	Gerd von Rundstedt	A Kriegsakademie graduate of the Prussian nobility, and a major World War I veteran, Rundstedt distinguished himself as commander of numerous fronts of World War II including the Western and Eastern fronts of Europe.				
Army	Günther von Kluge	Field Marshal	Knight's Cross with Oak Leaves and Swords	Commander, 4th Army Commander-in-Chief, Army Group Centre Oberbefehlshaber West	Committed suicide in 1944.	Operation Mars; Battle of Kursk; Battle of Smolensk (1943); Operation Atlantic; Operation Goodwood; Battle of Verrières Ridge; Operation Cobra; Operation Lüttich; Falaise Gap
Army	Günther von Kluge	Commander of many successful operations including the invasion of Poland, France and the Soviet Union. Involved in the failed Hitler assassination, he decided to commit suicide.				
Army	Georg von Küchler	Field Marshal	Knight's Cross with Oak Leaves	Commander, 18th Army Commander-in-Chief, Army Group North	Arrested in 1948 by the Americans, for crimes against the Soviet Union. Released in 1953.	Battle of France; Battle of the Netherlands; Battle of the Lys (1940); Siege of Leningrad; Leningrad–Novgorod Offensive
Army	Georg von Küchler	Relieved von Leeb as commander of the siege of Leningrad. After this failed, withdrew Army Group North, which prevented its destruction.				
Army	Fedor von Bock	Field Marshal	Knight's Cross of the Iron Cross	Commander-in-Chief, Army Group North Commander-in-Chief, Army Group B Commander-in-Chief, Army Group Centre Commander-in-Chief, Army Group South	Was killed by a British fighter pilot in 1945 and became the only one of two of Adolf Hitler's field marshal's to die from enemy fire.	Invasion of Poland; Battle of the Netherlands; Battle of Belgium; Battle of France; Operation Barbarossa; Battle of Białystok-Minsk; Yelnya Offensive; Battle of Smolensk (1941); Battle of Moscow; Second Battle of Kharkov; Case Blue
Army	Fedor von Bock	Recipient of the Pour le Mérite from World War I, rose rapidly in rank to field marshal by the fall of France. Took command of Army Group Centre, whose Panzer groups penetrated the furthest into Russia. Was one of the senior Wehrmacht commanders before the outbreak of war. Play a decisive role in the defeat of Poland and France. Bock was German Army Group Center commander during Operation Barbarossa, after the defeat at Moscow was relieved of command by Hitler. After Reichenau death, he was appointed to take over Army Group South. He was instructmental in defeating Marshal Timoshenko forces at Kharkov. However, Hitler was displeased with Bock and dismissed him. Played no further part in the war				
Army	Erich von Manstein	Field Marshal	Knight's Cross of the Iron Cross with Oakleaves and Swords	Commander, 18th Infantry Division Commander, XXXVIII Army Corps Commander, LVI Panzer Corps Commander, 11th Army Commander-in-Chief, Army Group Don Commander-in-Chief, Army Group South	Imprisoned after war, later released and served as senior advisor to the Bundeswehr.	Battle of France; Battle of Sevastopol; Siege of Odessa (1941); Case Blue; Battle of Stalingrad; Operation Winter Storm; Third Battle of Kharkov; Battle of Kursk; Battle of the Dnieper; Battle of Kiev (1943); Kamenets-Podolsky pocket
Army	Erich von Manstein	The master of mobile battle, authored the original Sichelschnitt plan, a plan which enabled Germany to capture France with minimal casualties. Manstein captured Sevastapol and was responsible for shoring up the Southern Front after the defeat at Stalingrad. He later recaptured Kharkov. After the defeat at Kursk, he successfully handled his army group retreat. However, he was dismissed by Hitler after frequently clashing with him in 1944. He then played no further part in the war from then on.				
Army	Erwin Rommel	Field Marshal	Pour le Mérite, Knight's Cross of the Iron Cross with Oakleaves, Swords and Diamonds	Commander, 7th Panzer Division Commander, Afrika Korps Commander, Panzer Army Africa Commander, Army Group Africa Commander-in-Chief, Army Group B	Committed suicide after being implicated in the Valkyrie plot. Official cause of death by the State was succumbing to wounds from an Allied air attack.	Battle of France; Battle of Arras (1940); Siege of Lille (1940); North African Campaign; Western Desert Campaign; Operation Sonnenblume; Siege of Tobruk; Operation Brevity; Operation Battleaxe; Operation Crusader; Battle of Gazala; Battle of Bir Hakeim; First Battle of El Alamein; Battle of Alam Halfa; Second Battle of El Alamein; Battle of El Agheila; Tunisia Campaign; Battle of the Kasserine Pass; Battle of Medenine; Battle of Normandy; Battle for Caen
Army	Erwin Rommel	Nicknamed The Desert Fox, Rommel headed the German campaign of North Africa. Rommel was highly decorated in World War I with the Pour le Mérite, Germany's highest award. During World War II, he made an immediate impact in the Saharan desert, conquering all of West Africa and threatening to reach Suez. A number of factors such as stretching supply lines and the reinforcement of Allied military power (both in Morocco and Egypt) turned the tide in the favour of the Allies, and his forces were routed in the Battle of Tunisia in 1943. Before he could counterattack, German high command reassigned him to defend the Atlantic Wall. Rommel failed to stop the allied invasion of Normandy. Though typically linked to the assassination of Hitler, Rommel likely did not take part in the July 20 plot as he did not want future generations to think that the Axis lost the war due to backstabbing. Nevertheless, Rommel committed suicide in order to avoid trial after the war.				
Army	Walter Model	Field Marshal	Knight's Cross of the Iron Cross with Oakleaves, Swords and Diamonds	Commander, 3rd Panzer Division Commander, XLI Panzer Corps Commander, Ninth Army Commander-in-Chief, Army Group North Commander-in-Chief, Army Group North Ukraine Commander-in-Chief, Army Group Centre Commander-in-Chief, Army Group B Oberbefehlshaber West	Committed suicide in 1945.	Battle of Moscow; Battles of Rzhev; Operation Mars; Battle of Kursk; Leningrad–Novgorod Offensive; Operation Tractable; Battle of Chambois; Hill 262; Falaise pocket; Allied advance from Paris to the Rhine; Operation Market Garden; Operation Bagration; Battle of Hürtgen Forest; Operation Queen; Battle of the Bulge; Western Allied invasion of Germany
Army	Walter Model	German Army officer whose expertise in defensive warfare earned him the nickname of the 'Führer's fireman'				
Army	Heinz Guderian	Colonel General	Knight's Cross of the Iron Cross with Oak Leaves	Commander, 2nd Panzer Division Commander, XVI Army Corps Commander, XIX Army Corps Commander, 2nd Panzer Army Acting Chief of the Oberkommando des Heeres	Died in 1954.	Oberkommando des Heeres; Battle of Wizna; Battle of Kobryń; Invasion of Luxembourg; Battle of France; Battle of Sedan (1940); Battle of Montcornet; Battle of Boulogne (1940); Battle of Smolensk (1941); Operation Wotan; Battle of Moscow
Army	Heinz Guderian	Early pioneer of Blitzkrieg tactics. Chief of OKH General Staff 1944–1945.				
Army	Friedrich Paulus	Generalfeldmarschall	Knight's Cross of the Iron Cross with Oak Leaves	Deputy Chief of the Oberkommando des Heeres Commander, 6th Army	Soviet captivity until 1953. Became a vocal critic of the Nazi regime.	Second Battle of Kharkov; Battle of Stalingrad; Operation Uranus
Army	Friedrich Paulus	Commander of the disastrous campaign in the Battle of Stalingrad.				
Army	Josef Dietrich	SS-Oberst-Gruppenführer und Generaloberst der Waffen-SS	Knight's Cross of the Iron Cross with Oakleaves, Swords and Diamonds	Commander, Leibstandarte SS Adolf Hitler; Commander, I SS Panzer Corps; Commander, 5th Panzer Army; Commander, 6th Panzer Army	Sentenced to life, reduced to 25 years imprisonment in 1946. Promoted welfare of ex-servicemen on release.	Battle of Vevi (1941); Battle of Kleisoura Pass; Operation Perch; Operation Epsom; Operation Charnwood; Operation Goodwood; Battle of Verrières Ridge; Operation Spring; Battle for Caen; Battle of the Bulge; Operation Spring Awakening
Army	Josef Dietrich	Before World War II, Dietrich was very close to Hitler, commanded his bodyguard unit, was a member of the Prussian State Council, and played a key part in the Night of the Long Knives. In World War II, he became the commander of 1st SS Panzer Division Leibstandarte SS Adolf Hitler and General of the Waffen-SS. Dietrich came into prominence for his role in the Battle of the Bulge in late 1944. He later commanded the defense of Vienna. He was a widely respected person in Germany both during and after the war.				
Air force	Hermann Göring	Reichsmarschall	Grand Cross of the Iron Cross	Reichsmarschall of the Greater German Reich (supreme commander of the Wehrmacht) Chief of the Oberkommando der Luftwaffe	Committed suicide after being sentenced to death for war crimes.	Oberkommando der Luftwaffe; Rotterdam Blitz; Battle of France; Battle of Britain; Battle of the Atlantic; Battle of Berlin
Air force	Hermann Göring	Was a high scoring air ace and took over the Red Baron's famous squadron, and won the prestigious Pour le Mérite in World War I. Hitler's second in command. Commander-in-Chief of Luftwaffe 1935–1945. He was involved with the running of Germany and the war, including implementation of the Holocaust.				
Air force	Albert Kesselring	Field Marshal	Knight's Cross of the Iron Cross with Oakleaves, Swords and Diamonds	Commander, Luftflotte 1 Commander, Luftflotte 2 Oberbefehlshaber Süd Commander, Army Group C Oberbefehlshaber West	Died in 1960 at the age of 75.	Oberkommando der Luftwaffe; Invasion of Poland; Battle of France; Battle of Britain; Battle of Moscow; Mediterranean and Middle East theatre of World War II; North African Campaign; Tunisia Campaign; Siege of Malta (World War II); Italian Campaign (World War II); Western Allied invasion of Germany
Air force	Albert Kesselring	Was commander-in-chief of Luftwaffe South (1941–1943), then South-west (1943–1945), then West Europe (1945). Chief of the defense of Italy against the allies during the prolonged battles of Anzio and Monte Cassino. Was a leader in the defense of Germany at the end of the war. Kesselring was admired by both sides of the war and was responsible for protecting priceless artworks and even the City of Rome from destruction.				
Air force	Wolfram Freiherr von Richthofen	Field Marshal	Knight's Cross of the Iron Cross with Oak Leaves	Commander, 8th Air Corps Commander, Luftflotte 2 Commander, Luftflotte 4	Died in 1945.	Battle of France; Battle of Montcornet; Case Blue; Battle of Greece; Battle of Stalingrad
Air force	Robert Ritter von Greim	Field Marshal	Knight's Cross of the Iron Cross with Oakleaves, Swords and Diamonds	Commander, 5th Air Corps Commander, 8th Air Corps Commander, Luftflotte 6 Chief of the Oberkommando der Luftwaffe	Committed suicide in 1945.	Western Front (World War II); Eastern Front (World War II)
Air force	Robert Ritter von Greim	An ace of World War I and winner of the prestigious Pour le Mérite award. Before World War II, went to China to help build their air force. A commander of the Luftwaffe during the Battle of Poland. He was loyal to Hitler to the end, flying in on 26 April 1945 with Hanna Reitsch. He and Hanna Reitsch said "It was the blackest day when we could not die at our Führer's side.".				
Air force	Kurt Student	General	Knight's Cross of the Iron Cross with Oakleaves	Commander, 1st Parachute Division	Held as a Prisoner of War by the British and freed in 1948.	Battle of Rotterdam; Balkan Campaign (World War II); Battle of Crete; Operation Market Garden; Battle of Overloon
Air force	Kurt Student	An ace of World War I. Before World War II, trained troops in airborne operations. Commanded the successful airborne operations in the Battle of Crete. Commanded the highly successful operation to free Benito Mussolini. Successful again in the defense against airborne landings near Arnhem.				
Navy	Erich Raeder	Grand Admiral	Knight's Cross of the Iron Cross	Chief of the Oberkommando der Marine	Died in 1960.	Oberkommando der Marine; German occupation of Norway; Battle of the Atlantic; Operation Sea Lion
Navy	Erich Raeder	Commander-in-Chief of Kriegsmarine 1936–1943.				
Navy	Karl Dönitz	Grand Admiral	Knight's Cross of the Iron Cross with Oak Leaves	Befehlshaber der U-Boote Chief of the Oberkommando der Marine President of Germany	Briefly became President of Germany. Spent 10 years in prison. Died in 1980.	Oberkommando der Marine; Battle of the Atlantic
Navy	Karl Dönitz	Commander-in-Chief of Kriegsmarine 1943–1945.				

==== Italy ====
Armed Force	Name	Highest Rank	Highest Award	Commands	Fate	Theatres / Battles
Army
Army	Pietro Badoglio	Marshal of Italy	Knight of the Supreme Order of the Most Holy Annunciation	Chief of the Supreme General Staff Viceroy of Ethiopia Prime Minister of Italy	Succeeded Mussolini and arranged an Armistice of his country with the Allies. Died in 1956 of natural causes (Cardiac asthma).	Mediterranean and Middle East theatre of World War II; Adriatic Campaign of World War II
Army	Pietro Badoglio	Supreme commander of the Royal Italian Army. Was not in favour of Italy's alliance to Germany, and resigned after the Battle of Greece.				
Army	Rodolfo Graziani	Marshal of Italy	Knight Grand Cross of the Order of Saints Maurice and Lazarus	Chief of Staff of the Royal Italian Army Governor-General of Libya Governor-General of Italian East Africa Minister of National Defense of the Italian Social Republic	Graziani was sentenced to 19 years in jail but only 4 months were served. Died in 1955.	North African Campaign; Italian Campaign; Mediterranean and Middle East theatre of World War II
Army	Rodolfo Graziani	Viceroy of Italian East Africa, Governor-General of Italian Libya, Minister of Defense of RSI.				
Army	Ugo Cavallero	Marshal of Italy	Knight's Cross of the Iron Cross	Chief of the Supreme General Staff Viceroy of Ethiopia	Committed suicide in 1943 after alienating both Germany and non-fascist Italy.	Mediterranean and Middle East theatre of World War II; Adriatic Campaign of World War II; North African Campaign; Balkan Campaign (World War II); Greco-Italian War; Capture of Klisura Pass; Battle of Greece
Army	Ugo Cavallero	Chief of the Italian Supreme Command 1940–1943.				
Army	Giovanni Messe	Marshal of Italy	Grand Officer of the Military Order of Savoy	Commander, Italian Expeditionary Corps in Russia Commander, First Army Chief of the Supreme General Staff	Became a member of the Italian Senate. Died in 1968.	North African Campaign; Battle of Petrikowka; Tunisia Campaign; Operation Pugilist; Battle of El Guettar; Battle of Wadi Akarit; Operation Vulcan; Balkan Campaign (World War II)
Army	Giovanni Messe	Commander of the Italian Expeditionary Corps in Russia. Later defected to the Allies as leader of the Italian Co-belligerent Army				
Army	Ettore Bastico	Marshal of Italy	Knight Grand Cross of the Order of Merit of the Italian Republic	Governor of the Italian Islands of the Aegean Governor-General of Libya Commander-in-Chief of Italian forces in North Africa	Marshal of Italy and high rank officer during North Africa Campaign. Died in 1972.	North African Campaign
Army	Ettore Bastico	Governor of the Italian Aegean Islands and Libya.				
Army	Mario Roatta	General	Silver Medal of Military Valor (3)	Deputy Chief of Staff of the Royal Italian Army Commander, Second Army	Removed from service by Badoglio in 1943 under Allies' request. He later fled to Spain living under protection of Francisco Franco. In Italy he was sentenced in absentia to life imprisonment but his sentence was overturned in 1948. Died in 1968.	Battle of Málaga; Battle of Guadalajara; World War II in Yugoslavia; Invasion of Yugoslavia; Case White
Army	Mario Roatta	General of the Italian Second Army known for his cruelty against civilians in the Italian-occupied Yugoslavia and for the deportation of many Slavs to the Rab concentration camp.				
Army	Alfredo Guzzoni	General	Commander of the Order of Saints Maurice and Lazarus	Commander-in-Chief, Higher Forces Command Albania Commander, Fourth Army Commander, Army Group Liguria	Died in 1965.	Italian invasion of France; Allied invasion of Sicily
Army	Alfredo Guzzoni	Commander-in-Chief of Army Group Liguria.				
Army	Vittorio Ambrosio	General	Commander of the Military Order of Savoy	Commander, 2nd Army Chief of Staff of the Italian Army	Was Chief of Staff of the Italian Army. Was demoted to Inspector-General of Army by Badoglio because the Allies didn't trust him. Died in 1958.	Invasion of Yugoslavia
Army	Vittorio Ambrosio	Served an instrumental role in the fall of Benito Mussolini and the breakdown of the alliance between Italy and Germany.				
Army	Giuseppe Castellano	General	Bronze Medal of Military Valor		Negotiated the armistice between Italy and the Allied armed forces in September 1943. Died in 1977.	Invasion of Yugoslavia
Army	Emilio de Bono	Marshal of Italy	Knight of the Supreme Order of the Most Holy Annunciation		He was one of the members of the Fascist Grand Council who voted oust Benito Mussolini. After Mussolini was put in charge of the Italian Social Republic, de Bono was sentenced to death after the Verona trial in 1944.	Second Italo-Ethiopian War
Navy	Arturo Riccardi	Admiral	Grand Officer of the Order of Saints Maurice and Lazarus	Chief of Staff of the Regia Marina	Removed from office by Badoglio. Died in 1966.	Battle of the Mediterranean
Navy	Arturo Riccardi	Served as Chief of staff of the Italian Navy.				
Navy	Angelo Iachino	Admiral	Grand Officer of the Order of the Crown of Italy	Commander-in-Chief, Battle Fleet	Died in 1976.	Battle of the Mediterranean; Battle of Cape Spartivento; Battle of Cape Matapan; First Battle of Sirte; Second Battle of Sirte; Operation Vigorous; Operation Halberd
Navy	Angelo Iachino	Commander of the Italian Naval Academy				
Navy	Junio Valerio Borghese	Frigate captain	Knight of the Military Order of Savoy	Commander of the Decima Flottiglia MAS	Died under mysterious circumstances in 1974. His death could be compatible with arsenic poisoning.	Mediterranean and Middle East theatre of World War II; Raid on Alexandria
Navy	Junio Valerio Borghese	Known for his neofascist activism in post-war Italy and for the Golpe Borghese.				
Navy	Inigo Campioni	Admiral	Grand Officer of the Order of Saints Maurice and Lazarus		Executed by a firing squad at Parma on 24 May 1944 after being convicted of high treason by the military tribunal of the Italian Social Republic.	Battle of the Mediterranean; Battle of Calabria; Battle of Taranto; Operation White; Battle of Cape Spartivento; Dodecanese Campaign
Navy	Giuseppe Fioravanzo	Admiral	Military Order of Italy		Died in 1975.	Operation Harpoon; Battle of Cape Matapan
Navy	Alberto Da Zara	Admiral	Military Order of Italy		Died in 1951.	Operation Pedestal; Operation Harpoon
Air Force	Italo Balbo	Marshal of the Air Force	Knight Grand Cross of the Order of Saints Maurice and Lazarus	Quadrumvir of the Grand Council of Fascism Minister of the Air Force Governor-General of Libya	Killed by friendly fire over Tobruk in 1940.	North African Campaign
Air Force	Italo Balbo	Governor-General of Libya, Commander-in-Chief of Italian North Africa.				
Air Force	Rino Corso Fougier	Chief of Staff of the Italian Air Force	Knight Grand Cross of the Order of Saints Maurice and Lazarus	Chief of Staff of the Royal Italian Air Force Commander of the Corpo Aereo Italiano	Served as the commander of the Corpo Aereo Italiano. Served as the Chief of Staff of the Italian Air Force between 1941 and 1943. Died in 1963.	Battle of Britain
Air Force	Rino Corso Fougier	Commanded the Regia Aeronautica between 1941 and 1943.				
Air Force	Francesco Pricolo	Chief of Staff of the Italian Air Force	Military Order of Savoy	Chief of Staff of the Royal Italian Air Force	Served as the Chief of Staff of the Italian Air Force from 1939 to 1941. Died in 1980	Siege of Malta

==== Japan ====
Armed Force	Name	Highest Rank	Highest Award	Commands	Fate	Theatres / Battles
Army	Hideki Tojo	General	Order of the Rising Sun	Prime Minister of Japan Minister of War Chief of Army General Staff Chief of Staff of the Kwantung Army	Executed in 1948.	Supreme War Council; Second Sino-Japanese War; Pacific War
Army	Hideki Tojo	Prime minister of Japan and President of the Imperial Rule Assistance Association in 1941-1944 was also a military commander. Chief of the Army General Staff in 1944.				
Army	Hajime Sugiyama	Field Marshal	Order of the Rising Sun	Minister of the Army Inspector-General of Military Training Commander North China Area Army Commander Mongolia Garrison Army Chief of Imperial Japanese Army General Staff Commander First General Army	Committed suicide shortly after the end of the war.	Supreme War Council; Second Sino-Japanese War; Pacific War
Army	Hajime Sugiyama	Chief of the Army General Staff 1940–1944.				
Army	Prince Kotohito Kan'in	Field Marshal	Order of the Chrysanthemum	Chief of Imperial Japanese Army General Staff	Died in 1945	Supreme War Council; Second Sino-Japanese War; Battle of Wuhan; Pacific War
Army	Prince Kotohito Kan'in	Chief of staff of the Army, 1931–1940				
Army	Hisaichi Terauchi	Field Marshal	Order of the Rising Sun	Commander, Taiwan Army of Japan Commander, North China Area Army Minister of the Army Commander-in-Chief, Southern Expeditionary Army Group	Died in a prisoner of war camp in Malaya June 1946.	South West Pacific theatre of World War II; Kokoda Track campaign; South-East Asian theatre of World War II; Battle of Mount Song
Army	Hisaichi Terauchi	Son of former PM Terauchi Masatake, became the senior officer of the Imperial Japanese after the coup of 1936. Was at one time considered as Tojo successor after the latter's resignation.				
Army	Shunroku Hata	Field Marshal	Order of the Rising Sun	Commander, 14th Division Commander, Taiwan Army of Japan Inspector-General of Military Training Commander, Central China Expeditionary Army Minister of the Army Commander-in-Chief, China Expeditionary Army Commander-in-Chief, 2nd General Army	Sentenced to imprisonment.	Second Sino-Japanese War; Battle of Taierzhuang; Battle of Wuhan; Zhejiang-Jiangxi Campaign; Battle of Henan-Hunan-Guangxi
Army	Shunroku Hata	Commanded the Second General Army, based in Hiroshima from 1944 to 1945 in preparation for the anticipated Allied invasion of the Japanese home islands.				
Army	Tomoyuki Yamashita	General	Order of the Rising Sun	Commander, 3rd Imperial Infantry Regiment Commander, 4th Division Commander, 25th Army Commander, First Area Army Military Governor of the Philippines Commander, Fourteenth Area Army	Executed at 1946.	South-East Asian theatre of World War II; Japanese invasion of Thailand; Malayan Campaign; Battle of Kampar; Battle of Singapore; Invasion of Sumatra; Battle of Leyte; Battle of Ormoc Bay; Invasion of Lingayen Gulf; Battle of Luzon; Battle of Bessang Pass; Raid at Cabanatuan; Battle of Maguindanao
Army	Tomoyuki Yamashita	Forced the surrender of the allies in the Battle of Singapore. Defender of the Philippines against MacArthur. an American military tribunal in Manila tried General Yamashita for war crimes relating to the Manila Massacre and many atrocities in the Philippines and Singapore against civilians and prisoners of war, such as the Sook Ching massacre, and sentenced him to death. This controversial case has become a precedent regarding the command responsibility for war crimes and is known as the Yamashita Standard.				
Army	Iwane Matsui	General	Order of the Rising Sun	Commander, 11th Division Commander, Taiwan Army of Japan Commander, Shanghai Expeditionary Army Commander, Central China Expeditionary Army	Retired 1938, executed in 1948.	Second Sino-Japanese War; Battle of Shanghai; Battle of Nanjing
Army	Iwane Matsui	Arrested by the American occupation authorities after the surrender of Japan, Matsui was charged with war crimes in connection with the actions of the Japanese army in China also known as The Nanking Massacre. In 1948, the International Military Tribunal for the Far East (IMTFE) found him guilty of class B and C war crimes, and he was hanged that December at Sugamo Prison, alongside six others, including Hideki Tojo. He was 70 at the time of his death.				
Navy	Osami Nagano	Fleet Admiral	Order of the Rising Sun	Minister of the Navy Chief of Imperial Japanese Navy General Staff	Died of a heart attack in 1947.	Supreme War Council; Pacific War
Navy	Osami Nagano	Chief of the Navy General Staff, 1941–1944.				
Navy	Prince Fushimi Hiroyasu	Fleet Admiral	Order of the Chrysanthemum	Chief of Imperial Japanese Navy General Staff	Died in 1946.	Supreme War Council; Pacific War
Navy	Prince Fushimi Hiroyasu	Chief of staff of the Navy, 1932–1941.				
Navy	Isoroku Yamamoto	Fleet Admiral	Order of the Chrysanthemum	Director of the Imperial Japanese Navy Aviation Bureau Vice-Minister of the Navy Commander-in-Chief, First Fleet Commander-in-Chief, Combined Fleet	The plane carrying him was shot down in 1943.	Pacific Ocean theatre of World War II; Attack on Pearl Harbor; Battle of Midway; Solomon Islands campaign; Invasion of Tulagi (May 1942); Guadalcanal Campaign; Battle of Savo Island; Battle of the Eastern Solomons; Battle of the Santa Cruz Islands; Naval Battle of Guadalcanal; Battle of Rennell Island; Operation Ke; Operation I-Go
Navy	Isoroku Yamamoto	Commander of the 7 December 1941 Attack on Pearl Harbor, Hawaii. Commander-in-Chief of the Imperial Japanese Navy 1939–1943. Isoroku Yamamoto, was killed on Bougainville Island when his transport bomber aircraft was shot down by United States Army Air Forces fighter aircraft operating from Kukum Field on Guadalcanal.				
Navy	Mineichi Koga	Fleet Admiral	Order of the Rising Sun	Vice Chief of the Imperial Japanese Navy General Staff Commander, 2nd Fleet Commander-in-Chief, China Area Fleet Commander-in-Chief, Combined Fleet	Killed in plane crash 1944.	Pacific Ocean theatre of World War II; Battle of Hong Kong; Bombing of Rabaul (November 1943)
Navy	Mineichi Koga	Commander-in-Chief of the Imperial Japanese Navy 1943–1944.				
Navy	Soemu Toyoda	Admiral	Order of the Rising Sun	Commander-in-Chief, 4th Fleet Commander-in-Chief, 2nd Fleet Commander-in-Chief, Kure Naval District Commander-in-Chief, Yokosuka Naval District Chief of Imperial Japanese Navy General Staff	Died in 1957 at the age of 73.	Supreme War Council; Pacific War
Navy	Soemu Toyoda	Commander-in-Chief of the Imperial Japanese Navy 1944–1945, Chief of staff of the Navy 1945.				
Navy	Chūichi Nagumo	Admiral	Order of the Rising Sun	Commander-in-Chief, 1st Air Fleet Commander-in-Chief, 3rd Fleet Commander-in-Chief, Sasebo Naval District Commander-in-Chief, Kure Naval District Commander-in-Chief, 1st Fleet Commander-in-Chief of Central Pacific Area Fleet and 14th Air Fleet	Committed suicide in 1944 during the battle of Saipan.	Attack on Pearl Harbor; Indian Ocean raid; Bombing of Darwin; Battle of Midway; Battle of the Eastern Solomons; Battle of the Santa Cruz Islands; Battle of Saipan
Navy	Chūichi Nagumo	Torpedo specialist and commander of the Carrier Striking Task Force that attacked Pearl Harbor. Successful raids at Darwin and the Indian Ocean were reversed at the Battle of Midway. Although he had tactical victories in the Guadalcanal campaigns, his battle strength was severely depleted, and was switched to the defence of the Mariana Islands.				
Navy	Jisaburō Ozawa	Vice Admiral	Order of the Sacred Treasure	Commander-in-Chief, Combined Fleet	Died in 1966.	Invasion of Sumatra (1942); Battle of Palembang; Battle of the Philippine Sea; Battle of Leyte Gulf
Navy	Jisaburō Ozawa	Replaced Toyoda in 1945 to become commander-in-chief of the Japanese Combined Fleet				

Army: Korechika Anami

==== Hungary ====
Armed Force	Name	Highest Rank	Highest Award	Commands	Fate	Theatres / Battles
Army	Gusztáv Jány	Colonel General	Knight's Cross of the Iron Cross	Commander, Hungarian Second Army	Sentenced to death in 1947.	Battle of Voronezh; Battle of Stalingrad; Ostrogozhsk–Rossosh Offensive; Operation Little Saturn
Army	Gusztáv Jány	Commanders of the Hungarian Second Army at Battle of Stalingrad.				
Army	Dezső László	Colonel General	Knight's Cross of the Iron Cross	Commander, Hungarian First Army	Sentenced to death in 1949.	Battle of the Dukla Pass; Battle of Budapest
Army	Dezső László	Commanders of the Hungarian First Army at Battle of Budapest				
Army	Géza Lakatos	Colonel General	Knight's Cross of the Iron Cross	Commander, Hungarian First Army Commander, Hungarian Second Army Prime Minister of Hungary	Died in 1967, Australia at the age of 77.	militarily organized corps
Army	Géza Lakatos	Was a colonel general in the Hungarian Army during World War II who served briefly as Prime Minister of Hungary, under governor Miklós Horthy from 29 August 1944, until 15 October 1944.				
Army	Ferenc Szombathelyi	Colonel General	Order of Merit of the Kingdom of Hungary	Chief of General Staff of the Royal Hungarian Army	Died in 1946.	Operation Barbarossa; Hungarian occupation of Yugoslav territories
Army	Ferenc Szombathelyi	Served as Chief of Army Staff of the Royal Hungarian Army.				
Army	Ferenc Feketehalmy-Czeydner	Colonel General	Order of Merit of the Kingdom of Hungary	Commanding General, V Corps	Died in 1946.	Hungarian occupation of Yugoslav territories
Army	Ferenc Feketehalmy-Czeydner	Had a significant role in the Novi Sad massacre.				
Army	Béla Miklós	Colonel General	Order of Vitéz	Commander, Hungarian First Army Prime Minister of Hungary	Died in 1948.	Operation Panzerfaust
Army	Béla Miklós	Commanded the Hungarian First Army. He supported leaving the Axis powers and joining the Red Army.				

==== Thailand ====
Armed Force	Name	Highest Rank	Highest Award	Commands	Fate	Theatres / Battles
Army	Plaek Phibunsongkhram	Field marshal	Order of the Nine Gems	Commander of the Royal Thai Army Prime Minister of Thailand Minister of Defence	Later ousted after the defeat of the Japanese, only to return to power in 1948 and become prime minister until 1957.	South-East Asian theatre of World War II; French-Thai War; Japanese invasion of Thailand; Malayan Campaign; Burma Campaign
Army	Plaek Phibunsongkhram	Prime Minister and dictator of Thailand during the war, eventually commanding the Royal Thai Armed Forces during the French-Thai War.				
Army	Charun Rattanakun Seriroengrit	Lieutenant general	Order of the Crown of Thailand	Commander, Phayap Army	Commander of an infantry battalion and took part in the invasion and occupation of the Shan States in Burma.	Franco-Thai War; Japanese conquest of Burma; Burma Campaign
Army	Charun Rattanakun Seriroengrit	Commander of Phayap Army during the Pacific War.				

==== Romania ====
Armed Force	Name	Highest Rank	Highest Award	Commands	Fate	Theatres / Battles
Army	Ion Antonescu	Marshal of Romania	Order of Michael the Brave	Prime Minister of Romania Conducător of Romania Minister of War of Romania Commander-in-Chief of Romanian Armed Forces	Executed in 1946.	Eastern Front (World War II); Operation München; Second Jassy–Kishinev Offensive
Army	Ion Antonescu	Nicknamed Câinele Roșu ("Red Dog"). Took control of Romania when Carol II abdicated and established a dictatorship with the Iron Guard Party. Got rid of the Iron Guard during their attempted coup in 1941. Acted as Commander-in-Chief of the Romanian Army and Conducător of Romania, recapturing Bessarabia and northern Bucovina, then appointed himself marshal. When his forces were decimated at the Battle of Stalingrad, he started negotiating for peace. His career ended in 1944 when he was arrested by King Michael, who signed an armistice with the Allies.				
Army	Petre Dumitrescu	Army General	Knight's Cross of the Iron Cross with Oak Leaves	General Officer Commanding, Romanian Third Army	Died in 1950 after a bout with cancer.	Eastern Front (World War II); Operation München; Battle of Stalingrad; Dnieper–Carpathian Offensive; First Jassy–Kishinev Offensive; Second Jassy–Kishinev Offensive
Army	Petre Dumitrescu	Commanded the Romanian First Army between 1937 and 1941. Commanded the Romanian Third Army between 1941 and 1944. After Adolf Hitler convinced Ion Antonescu to continue the war beyond Romania's pre-1940 borders, Dumitrescu then led the Third Army to the Crimea, taking part in the Battle of the Sea of Azov. In 1942 he was made General of the Army, thus becoming Antonescu's second-in-command. The German forces in Stalingrad were in dire need of assistance, and the German High Command transferred many of its troops to the besieged city, which meant the Third Army now had fewer troops to defend an increasingly large front. The German Command, however, chose to ignore Dumitrescu's reports about a Soviet troop buildup in the southwest and request for anti-tank weapons, as they did with his repeated suggestions to attack the Soviet bridgehead at Kletskaya. After the 1944 Romanian coup d'état Dumitrescu turned against Nazi Germany and captured more than 6,000 German prisoners of war. He retired in early September, 1944 after the Romanian Army and the Red Army retook Northern Transylvania and advanced into Hungary. Dumitrescu was put under house arrest and put on trial for war crimes by the new communist government, but was eventually acquitted because of a lack of evidence.				
Army	Constantin Constantinescu-Claps	Army General	Order of Michael the Brave	General Officer Commanding, Romanian Fourth Army	Died in 1961.	Eastern Front (World War II); Battle of Stalingrad
Army	Constantin Constantinescu-Claps	Commanded 10th Army Corps in 1940, the 11th Army Corps in 1941 and the Romanian Fourth Army between 1941 and 1943. He took part in Operation München and the Siege of Odessa. In the early stages of Operation Barbarossa, General Nicolae Ciupercă noted: "General Constantinescu has led the army corps with a lot of competence, causing, indirectly, the withdrawal of the Soviet forces between the Dniester River and the Suhoz Lake. I consider him to be a very good army corps commander, who is distinguished by great devotion and precious optimism". He fought later at the Battle of Stalingrad, where the Romanian armies suffered a crushing defeat. Constantinescu’s 4th Army, was deployed to the south of Stalingrad. Most of these formations were in deplorable shape, with at best 73% of necessary manpower, with the 1st Infantry Division going as low as 25% and an almost nonexistent arsenal of heavy anti-tank guns. In 1943, Constantinescu-Claps was relieved of his assignment and replaced by Constantin Sănătescu. In spite of his high rank, he never received any German medals and was in conflict with the German leadership and Conducător Ion Antonescu who merely tolerated him allegedly for his abilities as a general.				
Army	Constantin Sănătescu	Army General		General Officer Commanding, 4th Army Corps General Officer Commanding, Romanian Fourth Army Chief of the Romanian General Staff	Died in 1948.	Eastern Front (World War II)
Army	Constantin Sănătescu	In 1939 he held the positions of commander of the 8th Army Corps and later that year commander of the Cavalry Corps. He commanded the 4th Army Corps between 1941 and 1943. He stopped the Pogrom from Dorohoi against the Jews that was launched in 1940. He was promoted to Army Corps General in 1942 and commanded the Romanian Fourth Army between 1943 and 1944. He participated in several meetings with civilians and soldiers close to the Royal House who planned the overthrow of the Antonescu regime and was a major participant in the 1944 Romanian coup d'état, he was also a close friend of King Michael I. On the day of the coup, when General Dumitru Dămăceanu proposed to move it to 26 August as it's a bath day for the Bucharest Garrison and soldiers will not be prepared in time, Sanatescu is reported to have replied "Dămăceanu, you forget that at Mărăşeşti we won in pijamas, this time we will win naked!". Referring to an event during the Battle of Mărăşeşti in World War I Atacul cămășilor albe where the Romanian Infantry Regiment 32 "Mircea" was forced to fight in white shirts due to a surprise attack by the German Army while they were cleaning their uniforms, Major Ionescu Atanasie desperately ordered a bayonet charge in white shirts that pushed back the German attack.				
Army	Gheorghe Avramescu	Army General	German Cross in Gold	General Officer Commanding, 10th Division General Officer Commanding, Mountain Corps General Officer Commanding, III Corps General Officer Commanding, VI Corps General Officer Commanding, 4th Army	Died in 1945.	Eastern Front (World War II)
Army	Gheorghe Avramescu	Commanded the Romanian Mountain Corps between 1941 and 1943. Commanded the Romanian Fourth Army between 1944 and 1945. At the head of the Mountain Corps, he participated in Operation München, the Battle of the Sea of Azov, the Crimean campaign, and the Siege of Sevastopol. After the fall of Sevastopol, his Corps occupied Crimea. After the Royal Coup, he had many battles with his 4th Army, including the Battle of Turda and the Battle of Debrecen, and was in command at the Battle of Carei, the last engagement of the war within the present borders of Romania. He successfully led the 4th Army in the assault on the Zvolen–Banská Bystrica line, in what was the prelude to the Bratislava–Brno Offensive in Slovakia. Avramescu complained repeatedly to the Soviets about the lack of supplies to the Romanian Army and impossible tasks as the spearhead of the assaults. He was killed on 3 March 1945 in the car that was transporting him, the other 3 occupants were NKVD officers. According to the official report issued on 23 March 1945 by NKVD head Lavrentiy Beria, Avramescu was hit by a bullet through the car's windshield. On the same day, his wife and daughter were arrested and sent to Siberia. His daughter committed suicide; according to Soviet sources, this happened on 6 March 1945. Adela returned to Romania in 1956.				
Army	Vasile Atanasiu	Army General	Order of the White Lion	General Officer Commanding, 1st Romanian Army	Died in 1964.	Eastern Front (World War II); Prague Offensive
Army	Vasile Atanasiu	Commanded the 3rd Army Corps in the liberation of Bessarabia, the battle for the beachhead of Albiţa on the Prut River, the advance to the Dniester at Tiraspol between 1941 and 1943. Commanded the Romanian First Army in 1945, in the battles on the Czechoslovak front in the Javorina, between the rivers Hron and Morava and thereafter in Bohemia.				
Army	Nicolae Macici	Army General	Order of Michael the Brave			Eastern Front (World War II)
Army	Nicolae Macici	Commanded the 2nd Army Corps against the Soviets in the Danube Delta during Operation München, and later advanced towards Odessa in 1941. Commanded the Romanian First Army between 1941 and 1944. After King Michael's Coup of 23 August 1944, the Romanian First Army was able to hold the Carpathian Mountains passes until Soviet reinforcements arrived. Participated in the advance in Transylvania and joint Soviet–Romanian attack on Hungary and Slovakia.				
Army	Nicolae Ciupercă	Army General	Order of Michael the Brave			Eastern Front (World War II)
Army	Nicolae Ciupercă	Served as the Romanian Minister of Defense from 1938 to 1939. Briefly commanded the Romanian Second Army in 1940. Commanded the Romanian Fourth Army between 1939 and 1941. Was a devout anti-communist and would resign from the position of Minister of Defense after coming into conflict with King Carol II due to a proposal to decrease the budget of the Romanian military. He would later go on to claim this to be an action of corruption by Carol, as the king refused to explain to the general where the missing funds would go. When Adolf Hitler convinced Romanian Conducător Ion Antonescu to cross the Dniester River, Ciupercă was still in command of the 4th Army that would lay siege to Odessa. After the end of the war, Ciupercă joined the anti-communist Graiul Sângelui, the members of the organization sought to facilitate the actions of American airborne troops which they hoped were to land in Romania (see Vin americanii!). Following his the Soviet request to disband Ciupercă said "we will go to prison so it will be known that we did not want Romania to become a republic of the Soviet Union".				
Army	Ilie Șteflea	Army General	Order of Michael the Brave			Eastern Front (World War II)
Army	Ilie Șteflea	Commanded the Romanian Fourth Army in 1944.				
Army	Mihail Lascăr	Army Corps General	Knight's Cross of the Iron Cross with Oak Leaves		Died in 1959.	Eastern Front (World War II); Crimean Campaign; Battle of Stalingrad
Army	Mihail Lascăr	Commanded the 1st Mixed Mountain Brigade, an elite unit of the Romanian Third Army between 1941 and 1942. Commanded the 6th Division of the Romanian Third Army in 1942. Reorganized the remains of the Romanian Third Army after Operation Uranus into the Army Corps Lascar and kept fighting encircled. Adolf Hitler noted the bravery of his troops and he became the first foreigner to receive the highest German military award, only 8 other foreigners received the same award. Was taken prisoner after the Battle of Stalingrad and became commander of the Romanian Fourth Army in 1945. In 1947 he founded the football club Asociația Sportivă a Armatei București now CSA Steaua București. In 1949 he served as commander of the Military Academy in Bucharest. He was then Inspector-General of the Romanian Army until 1950 when he was discharged from active duty.				
Army	Ioan Mihail Racoviță	Army Corps General	Order of Michael the Brave	General Officer Commanding, Romanian Cavalry Corps General Officer Commanding, Romanian Fourth Army Minister of Defense of Romania	Died in 1954.	Eastern Front (World War II)
Army	Ioan Mihail Racoviță	Commanded the Romanian Cavalry Corps between 1941 and 1943. With the Cavalry Corps he advanced from Romania to the Caucasus. He participated in Operation München, the Battle of the Sea of Azov and the Battle of the Caucasus. Commanded the Romanian Mechanized Troops between 1943 and 1944. In 1944 and took over the command of the 4th Army, which had to be completely rebuilt after the Battle of Stalingrad and participated in defensive battles in Northern Romania against the advancing Red Army. He played an important role in the 23 August coup d'état				
Army	Gheorghe Mihail	Army Corps General	Order of Michael the Brave			Eastern Front (World War II)
Army	Gheorghe Mihail	Commanded the Doburja Army Corps in 1939. In 1948, the new communist regime arrested Mihail and took him for questioning. Manuscripts were found in his home that included, in the prosecutor's view, "a multitude of phrases containing insults and slanders addressed to the USSR and the Romanian regime". He was charged with sabotage alongside "a group of landowning saboteurs" and was subsequently accused of "intense activity against the working classes". He was released in 1960.				
Army	Constantin Nicolescu	Army Corps General	Order of Michael the Brave	Minister of Defense of Romania	Died in 1972.	Eastern Front (World War II)
Army	Constantin Nicolescu	Commanded the Bucharest Military between 1941 and 1943. Commanded the 4th Army Corps between 1943 and 1944. Was a major participant in King Michael's Coup of 1944, and from November 1944 until the abolition of the monarchy in December 1947 served as head of the royal household.				
Army	Corneliu Dragalina	Army Corps General	Knight's Cross of the Iron Cross	Governor-General of Bukovina	Died in 1949.	Eastern Front (World War II)
Army	Corneliu Dragalina	Commanded the 6th Army Corps between 1940 and 1943. At the beginning of September, the 6th Corps was assigned to the Romanian Fourth Army, commanded by General Constantin Constantinescu-Claps. Dragalina's 6th Corps troops received the brunt of the Soviet offensive south of Stalingrad. The 6th Corps fell back to the Aksay River, but to no avail. The remnants of the 6th Corps tried to defend a line of villages backed up by Radu Korne's detachment. The losses of the 6th Corps in this operation were catastrophic, with up to 80% in personnel at the 1st, 2nd, and 18th divisions. He demanded and received from the Romanian General Headquarters the authorization to make decisions independently from the German Army. Dragalina later lost his house in Timișoara and was harassed by the Securitate, but, unlike many other military commanders who had fought on the Eastern Front, he was not arrested.				
Army	Ioan Dumitrache	Army Corps General	Knight's Cross of the Iron Cross	General Officer Commanding, 2nd Mountain Division General Officer Commanding, Mountain Corps	Died in 1977.	Eastern Front (World War II)
Army	Ioan Dumitrache	Commanded the 2nd Mountain Division nicknamed "Divizia de Cremene" (Flint Division) between 1942 and 1944. His troops (vânători de munte) were recognized as the elite troops of the Romanian Army throughout the campaign on the Eastern Front. During the Battle of Stalingrad his division continued their offensive towards Alagir and Ordjonikidze in the Caucasus. Dumitrache's incursion constituted the farthest eastern advance of the Axis powers in the Eastern campaign. Following the Red Army's offensive in the Caucasus, surrounding the 13th Panzer Division near Mayramadag, Dumitrache's troops broke through the Soviet forces and allowed the German armored units to pull out. Afterwards, the Axis forces in the Caucasus were put on the defensive, and began to withdraw. During the retreat, Dumitrache took over the command of 4 Romanian Divisions (2 vanatori de munte and 2 regular infantry) and contained the Soviet push south of the Sivash Bay. During the last days of the battle for Sevastopol he evacuated with his troops and returned to Romania where he was promoted and placed in the command of the Romanian Mountain Corps. One day after King Michael's Coup, the German troops occupied Brașov, the next day, Dumitrache's Corps retook Brașov, repulsing subsuqent attacks of German and Hungarian troops, and blocked the roads for the Germans retreating northward from Muntenia. He then participated in the offensive against Hungary. In 1945 he was accused of ordering the killing of 600 prisoners of war at Nalchik and arrested on suspicion of war crimes but was cleared of the charges and returned as commander of the Mountain Corps with the approval of Soviet General Ivan Susaikov. In 1949 he was arrested again by the Communist authorities for presumed war crimes but was released in 1950 due to lack of evidence.				
Army	Nicolae Dăscălescu	Army Corps General	Order of the Crown (Romania)	General Officer Commanding, 2nd Army Corps		Eastern Front (World War II)
Army	Nicolae Dăscălescu	Commanding the 2nd Army Corps between 1941 and 1945. His Corps was present at the Battle of Stalingrad and was overrun by numerical superior forces during Operation Uranus. The remnants of the Corps were withdrawn to Romania to be rebuilt and to protect the northern border. After King Michael's Coup on 23 August 1944, the 2nd Corps turned against its former German allies, took 10,500 prisoners, and participated in the advance in Transylvania as part of the Fourth Army under command of general Gheorghe Avramescu. When Avramescu was eliminated by the NKVD he became the new commander of the Romanian Fourth Army, under the command of Soviet general Rodion Malinovsky, he fought in the Bratislava–Brno Offensive and the Prague Offensive. In 1946, he was put on trial as a war criminal, but the court dismissed the accusations and cleared his name, he was further harassed until 1951, when he was thrown in the Jilava Prison for "agricultural sabotage".				
Army	Gheorghe Manoliu	Army Corps General	Knight's Cross of the Iron Cross	General Officer Commanding, 4th Mountain Division	Died in 1974.	Eastern Front (World War II)
Army	Gheorghe Manoliu	Commanded the 4th Mountain Division between 1940 and 1942. Was promoted in 1943 and commanded the 4th Army Corps.				
Army	Emanoil Bârzotescu	Army Corps General	Order of the Crown (Romania)	General Officer Commanding, 1st Division General Officer Commanding, 6th Corps	Died in 1968.	Eastern Front (World War II)
Army	Emanoil Bârzotescu	Commanded the 1st Infantry Division between 1940 and 1942. Retired in 1942 and was recalled in 1945. Commanded the 6th Crops Area in 1945. He was arrested 1950, and sent to forced labor camps (Saligny, Peninsula, Midia) along the Danube–Black Sea Canal.				
Army	Ilie Cretulescu	Army Corps General	Order of the Crown (Romania)	General Officer Commanding, 4th Army Corps		Eastern Front (World War II)
Army	Ilie Cretulescu	Commanded the 4th Army Corps in 1940.				
Army	Dumitru Coroamă	Army Corps General	Order of Michael the Brave	General Officer Commanding, 4th Army Corps		Eastern Front (World War II)
Army	Dumitru Coroamă	Commanded the 4th Army Corps in 1941 and 1944. In the interwar was a member of the Iron Guard but despite his commitment to the revolutionary ideology of the Guard, he was well-liked by King Carol II, and in 1937 became commander of the Royal Palace garrison. This allowed him to sabotage Carol's attempt to use Palace troops against the Guard. During Corneliu Zelea Codreanu's arrest, Coroamă was expected to present Carol with a memorandum on behalf of Codreanu. Coroamă himself claimed that the initiative was curbed by Horia Sima, who did not want Codreanu alive. When Antonescu informed Carol that the Iron Guard wanted a new king, Antonescu also commented that the government "cannot count on the commanders, and especially not on General Coroamă, who has switched completely toward the Iron Guard." When the Iron Guard marched for the royal palace, General Coroamă refused to comply with the royal order of shooting down Guardists who marched in front of the Palace. According to several period witnesses, his resistance persuaded Antonescu to follow suit, and allowed for a bloodless transition. Antonescu was poorly impressed by Coroamă's inaction, telling Coroamă "You sir were the king's trusted man. If these were your ideas, then you shouldn't have accepted such an appointment." In the aftermath of Carol II's forced abdication, Coroamă was mistrusted and marginalized by Conducător Ion Antonescu. Like other Guardists, Coroamă was dissatisfied with Antonescu's regime, or "National Legionary State". Under the command of the 4th Army Corps in Iași, he witnessed the clashes between Antonescu and his Guard colleagues, peaking during the Legionary Rebellion of 1941. Coroamă took a moderate stance, refusing to side with the Iron Guard and his mediation helped Antonescu to restore order in Iași without bloodshed. According to Nazi German diplomatic cables, he did so because he feared that the Soviet Union would profit from the unrest and invade Romania. Later in 1941, as Nazi Germany and Romania opened an Eastern Front against the Soviet Union, Coroamă advised against continuing the offensive beyond Bessarabia. In 1944, he was one of the Romanian generals prepared to support Germany during Operation Spring Awakening, however, he switched his allegiance in support of the Royal Coup and worked to consolidate a national network of anti-communist resistance groups.				
Army	Mihail Cămărașu	Army Corps General	Order of the Crown (Romania)	General Officer Commanding, 7th Army Corps		Eastern Front (World War II)
Army	Mihail Cămărașu	Commanded the 7th Army Corps between 1941 and 1943.				
Army	Ioan Sion	Division General	Order of Michael the Brave		Died during the Battle of Stalingrad	Eastern Front (World War II)
Army	Ioan Sion	Commanded the 1st Armored Division between 1939 and 1942. Was known for fighting with his troops. Personally destroyed a Soviet tank by sneaking around, climbing it and throwing a grenade inside it. Died during the Battle of Stalingrad. He was posthumously promoted and awarded the Order of Michael the Brave.				
Army	Aurel Aldea	Division General	No Awards	General Officer Commanding, 11th Infantry Division, Infantry Division in April 1939		Eastern Front (World War II)
Army	Aurel Aldea	Commanded the 11th Infantry Division in 1938 and 4th Infantry Division in April 1939. Forced into retirement by Marshal Ion Antonescu in 1941. Major participant in King Michael's Coup of 1944. Major participant in anti-communist armed resistance between 1945 and 1946.				
Army	Radu Korne	Division General	Order of the Crown (Romania)	General Officer Commanding, 6th Motorized Roșiori Regiment, 8th Cavalry Division, 1st Armored Division		Eastern Front (World War II)
Army	Radu Korne	Commanding the 6th Motorized Roșiori Regiment between 1939 and 1942. The 8th Cavalry Division at the Battle of Stalingrad and 1st Armored Division in 1944. At the request of the Soviet Union, his division was disbanded in 1944 and he was arrested in his words "like a common burglar". In prison, he wrote a letter to Constantin Sănătescu, where he deplored the fact that so many of the Romanian senior officer corps were being dismissed en masse, while others were being arrested or harassed, after having fought in war as ordered by the king. He concluded his letter by asking, "Why are the prisons being filled with the most devoted soldiers of the country?". He was released in 1945 at the insistence of Constantin Sănătescu with the approval of Soviet General Vladislav Vinogradov, and retired from the army the next month. After the war he was investigated by the Bucharest People's Tribunal for "anti-Soviet propaganda" but was found not guilty. In 1948 his son, Mihai, managed to escape Communist Romania and settled in France. He was arrested by the Siguranța Statului secret police for "conspiracy against state security," and sent to Jilava Prison.				
Army	Nicolae Cambrea	Division General	Order of Michael the Brave	General Officer Commanding, 5th Infantry Division		Eastern Front (World War II)
Army	Nicolae Cambrea	Commanded the 5th Division in 1942. Became a Soviet prisoner of war but the following year joined his captors and became General Officer Commanding of the Tudor Vladimirescu Division made of Romanian pro-Soviet volunteers from former prisoners of war, which earned him the nickname "Red General".				
Army	Dumitru Dămăceanu	Brigadier General	Order of Michael the Brave	General Officer Commanding, 10th Roșiori Cavalry Regiment General Officer Commanding, Capital Military Command	Died in 1978.	Eastern Front (World War II)
Army	Dumitru Dămăceanu	Commanded the 10th Cavalry Regiment between 1941 and 1942. Chief of Staff in Bucharest Military between 1942 and 1944. Major participant in King Michael's Coup of 1944 where he organized and coordinated the military actions and resistance in Bucharest. After King Michael's forced abdication on 30 December 1947 and the complete Communist takeover of Romania, Dămăceanu was removed from the army. During the early 1950s he was degraded, arrested, tried and sentenced to serve time in prison.				
Army	Leonard Mociulschi	Brigadier General	Knight's Cross of the Iron Cross		Died in 1979.	Eastern Front (World War II)
Army	Leonard Mociulschi	Commanded the 1st Mixed Mountain Brigade, an elite unit of the Romanian Third Army between 1940 and 1941. Commanded the 3rd Mixed Mountain Brigade between 1942 and 1943. In 1948, he was arrested by the Communist authorities in Codlea and sent without trial to penal colonies at the Danube–Black Sea Canal.				
Army	Corneliu Teodorini	Brigadier General	Knight's Cross of the Iron Cross with Oak Leaves		Died in 1976.	Eastern Front (World War II)
Army	Corneliu Teodorini	Commanded the 6th Cavalry Regiment. Was one of the only 8 foreign recipients of the Knight's Cross of the Iron Cross with Oak Leaves and the lowest ranking general to be a recipient of the award for his actions during the Kerch–Eltigen Operation in 1943, where he pushed back the Red Army twice. After King Michael's Coup, Teodorini joined the "Army Resistance Group", an organization that included generals Aurel Aldea, Dumitru Coroamă, Constantin Sănătescu, Gheorghe Mihail, Leonard Mociulschi, Nicolae Rădescu and others around King Michael I seeking to prevent the communist takeover of the Romanian Army.				
Navy	Horia Macellariu	Rear Admiral	Knight's Cross of the Iron Cross	Commander-in-Chief, Black Sea Fleet	Died in 1989.	Black Sea Campaigns (1941–44); Operation Achse; Evacuation of the Crimea
Navy	Horia Macellariu	Commanded the Royal Romanian Navy's Black Sea Fleet between 1941 and 1944. He presided over a significant enlargement of the Romanian Black Sea Fleet, most notably the commissioning of the Romanian-built submarines Marsuinul and her smaller sister ship Rechinul, the former being the most powerful and modern Axis submarine in the Black Sea. The evacuation of the Crimea in April–May 1944 was the most complex and extensive operation of the Romanian Navy during the Second World War. From 15 April to 14 May, numerous German and Romanian warships escorted many convoys between Constanța and Sevastopol. Axis ships transported, under constant attacks from Soviet aircraft and shore artillery, over 30,000 troops. Of these, 18,000 were transported by Romanian ships. In total, Romanian and German convoys evacuated over 113,000 Axis troops from the Crimea. No Romanian Navy warships were lost during the evacuation. Macellariu's successful conduct of the evacuation and the achievements obtained by the Romanian warships under his command, in combat and number of Axis troops evacuated, earned him the Knight's Cross of the Iron Cross. After the 23 August 1944 coup which put Romania on the side of the Allies, the situation became uncertain. German Vice Admiral Helmuth Brinkmann had orders to hold Constanța at all costs. However, after a face-to-face meeting with Macellariu, he was persuaded to make an orderly retreat and avoid an unnecessary bloodshed. In 1948, Macellariu was arrested by the communist authorities and incarcerated at Jilava Prison. After a trial, he was sentenced to hard labor for life for high treason, a sentence subsequently reduced to 25 years.				

==== Slovakia ====
Armed Force	Name	Highest Rank	Highest Award	Commands	Fate	Theatres / Battles
Army	Ferdinand Čatloš	Major General		General Officer Commanding, Field Army Bernolák Minister of Defence of Slovakia	Was briefly imprisoned, set free in 1948, died in 1972.	Invasion of Poland; Eastern Front (World War II); Slovak National Uprising
Army	Ferdinand Čatloš	Slovak Minister of Defence and Chief General Staff.				

==== Bulgaria ====
Air force Stoyan Stoyanov

=== Others ===
==== Finland ====
Armed Force	Name	Highest Rank	Highest Award	Commands	Fate	Theatres / Battles
Army	Carl Gustaf Emil Mannerheim	Marshal of Finland	Grand Cross of the Order of the Cross of Liberty	Commander-in-Chief of the Finnish Defence Forces President of Finland	Succeeded Risto Ryti as President of Finland. Died in 1951	Winter War; Battle of Summa; Continuation War; Vyborg–Petrozavodsk Offensive; Eastern Front (World War II); Operation Barbarossa; Siege of Leningrad
Army	Carl Gustaf Emil Mannerheim	Was Commander-in-Chief of Finnish army during World War II. Organised the Mannerheim Line in the Karelian Peninsula.				
Army	Karl Lennart Oesch	Lieutenant General	Mannerheim Cross	Commander, II Corps Commander, IV Corps	Died in 1978	Finnish reconquest of the Karelian Isthmus (1941); Eastern Front (World War II); Vyborg–Petrozavodsk Offensive; Battle of Tienhaara; Battle of Tali-Ihantala
Army	Karl Lennart Oesch	An influential Finnish general. II Corps and III Corps of the Finnish ground forces were under his command at the end of the Continuation War.				
Army	Ruben Lagus	Lieutenant General	Mannerheim Cross	Commander, Finnish Armoured Division	Died in 1959.	Winter War; Continuation War; Lapland War; Battle of Taipaleenkylä; Battle of Ylimaa; Battle of Rovaniemi
Army	Ruben Lagus	Commanded the Finnish Armoured Division (Panssaridivisioona) during the Lapland War.				
Army	Erik Heinrichs	General	Mannerheim Cross	Commander, III Corps Commander, Army of the Isthmus Commander, Army of Karelia	Died in 1965.	Winter War; Continuation War; Battle of Taipale
Army	Erik Heinrichs	Commanded the Army of Karelia and the Army of the Isthmus.				
Army	Vilho Nenonen	General	Mannerheim Cross		Died in 1960.	Winter War; Continuation War
Army	Vilho Nenonen	He was extremely influential in the development of the Finnish Army's artillery. The trajectory calculation formulas he developed are still in use today by modern artillery.				
Army	Paavo Talvela	General	Mannerheim Cross	Commander, IV Corps Commander, III Corps Commander, VI Corps	Died in 1973.	Winter War; Battle of Tolvajärvi; Continuation War; Finnish reconquest of Ladoga Karelia (1941)
Army	Paavo Talvela	He commanded the Finnish III Corps in the Winter War from February 1940 to the end of the Winter War.				

==== Burma ====
Armed Force	Name	Highest Rank	Highest Award	Commands	Fate	Theatres / Battles
Army	Aung San	Major General	Order of the Star of the Revolution	Leader of the Thirty Comrades	Arranged for the establishment of Burmese independence, assassinated under mysterious circumstances in 1947.	South-East Asian theatre of World War II; Burma Campaign
Army	Aung San	Led the Burma National Army and the Anti-Fascist Organisation.				

== See also ==
- Allied leaders of World War II
- Axis leaders of World War II
