= Eltigen =

Eltigen may refer to:

- 2217 Eltigen, main-belt asteroid
- Eltigen (Heroyevskoe), part of the city of Kerch, Crimea
- Kerch–Eltigen Operation, World War II amphibious offensive on Crimea by the Red Army
