= Wilhelm Schöning =

German military officer

- Born: 8 June 1908; Gumbinnen, Kreis Gumbinnen, Province of East Prussia, German Empire
- Died: 2 November 1987 (aged 79); Bochum, North Rhine-Westphalia, Germany
- Military career
- Allegiance: Nazi Germany
- Branch: Army
- Rank: Oberstleutnant
- Conflicts: Battle of Budapest
- Awards: Knight's Cross of the Iron Cross with Oak Leaves, Order of Michael the Brave

Wilhelm Schöning (8 June 1908 – 2 November 1987) was a German military officer. He served as commander of the 66th Panzergrenadier Regiment of the 13th Panzer Division during the Siege of Budapest.

Most of the division was encircled and destroyed in Budapest between December 1944 and February 1945. Those who escaped, consisting of 200-300 men, were reformed under Schöning. Wounded during the battle, Schöning broke through Soviet lines and reached the German 3rd Cavalry Brigade on the Buda side. Schöning remembered it thus:

Suddenly I had the feeling that my leg was being torn off. (...) As my pistol was empty I ordered my lieutenant to finish me off because I didn't want to be taken prisoner. He was himself wounded in the arm. He then called to me: “Only another 2,000 metres, Lieutenant Colonel. We have to make it!'” I crept through the snow up a hill with the major...Two wounded grenadiers from our battle group picked us up under the arms under the heaviest fire and stood us upright and I dragged myself with several wounds to the feet the two kilometres to the German position.

== Awards and decorations ==
- Iron Cross (1939) 2nd Class (11 July 1940) & 1st Class (12 August 1941)
- German Cross in Gold on 14 February 1942 as Oberleutnant in the 10./Infanterie-Regiment 120 (motorized)
- Knight's Cross of the Iron Cross with Oak Leaves
  - Knight's Cross on 7 February 1944 as Major of the Reserves and commander of the I./Füsilier-Regiment "Feldherrnhalle"
  - Oak Leaves on 21 January 1945 as Major of the Reserves and leader of Panzergrenadier-Regiment 66
- Order of Michael the Brave
