= Corneliu Teodorini =

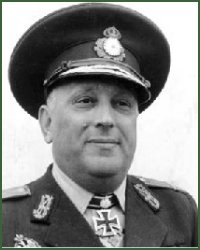
- Born: 18 September 1893; Craiova, Kingdom of Romania
- Died: 10 July 1976 (aged 82); Bucharest, Socialist Republic of Romania
- Military career
- Branch: Army
- Rank: Major General
- Commands: 6th Cavalry Division
- Conflicts: World War II
- Awards: Order of Michael the Brave, 3rd Class and 2nd Class; Knight's Cross of the Iron Cross with Oak Leaves

Corneliu Teodorini (18 September 1893 – 10 July 1976) was a Romanian general during World War II. He was a recipient of the Knight's Cross of the Iron Cross with Oak Leaves and the Order of Michael the Brave, 2nd Class.

He was born in Craiova. He was promoted to lieutenant colonel in 1934 and to colonel in 1938. During World War II, he was in command of the 1st Cavalry Regiment from June 1 to October 5, 1941. This was followed by command of the 8th Cavalry Brigade from October 5, 1941, to May 10, 1942. He then headed the propaganda department at the Romanian General Staff. From July 7 to October 5, 1942, he was in the cavalry headquarters at the Ministry of War. Teodorini commanded the Romanian forces during the Kerch–Eltigen Operation in Crimea in November 1943.

In the immediate aftermath of the Royal coup d'état of August 23, 1944 (when Romania switched sides from the Axis to the Allies), Teodorini joined the "Army Resistance Group", an organization that included generals Aurel Aldea, Dumitru Coroamă, Constantin Sănătescu, Gheorghe Mihail, Leonard Mociulschi, Nicolae Rădescu, and other officers around King Michael I seeking to prevent the communist takeover of the Romanian Army. The group came under the surveillance of the NKVD, under suspicion that they were supported by Great Britain and the United States. In September 1944, he commanded the 8th Cavalry Division at the Battle of Turda, where his troops fought hard at Luduș, the crossing of the Mureș River, and Sângeorgiu Hill.

Teodorini was put into retirement in March 1945 by the communist-led Petru Groza government. He owned a manor and a winery in Crețeni, which produced a variety of Drăgășani wine. He died in Bucharest in 1976.

== Awards ==
- Iron Cross (1939) 2nd Class (November 1941) & 1st Class (11 February 1943)
- Order of Michael the Brave
  - 2nd class – DR 3267/20.12.1943 (brigadier general, commander of 6th Cavalry Division)
  - 3rd class – DR 399/8.02.1943 (colonel, commander of 6th Cavalry Division)
- Knight's Cross of the Iron Cross with Oak Leaves
  - Knight's Cross 27 August 1943 as Colonel and commander of the Romanian 6th Cavalry Division
  - Oak Leaves on 8 December 1943 as Captain General (General de brigadă) and commander of the Romanian 6th Cavalry Division
