= Mihail Cămărașu =

Romanian general

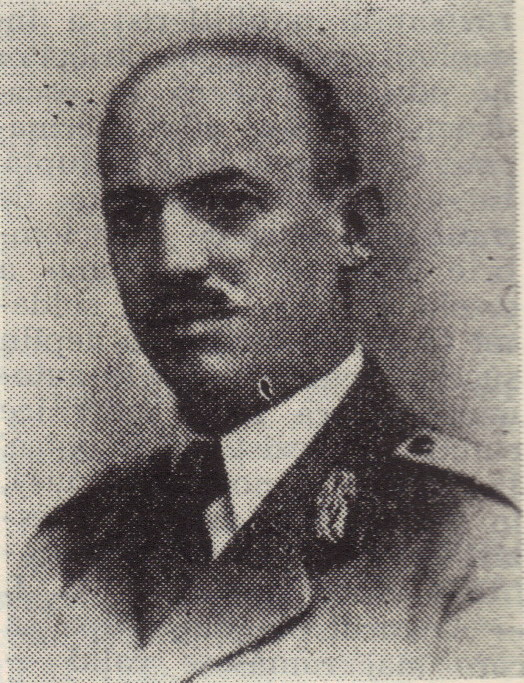
- Cămărașu before 1947
- Born: August 1, 1892; Bucharest, Kingdom of Romania
- Died: 19 June 1962 (aged 69); Bucharest, Romanian People's Republic
- Allegiance: Kingdom of Romania; Socialist Republic of Romania
- Service / branch: Army
- Rank: Lieutenant General
- Awards: Order of the Star of Romania, Officer class Order of Michael the Brave, 3rd class

Mihail Cămărașu (1 August 1892 – 19 June 1962) was a Romanian lieutenant-general during World War II.

He served as Chief of Staff VII Corps in 1940, and in 1943 went from Commanding Officer Infantry 18th Mountain Division to General Officer Commanding 103rd Mountain Command. In 1944, he was Romanian Liaison Officer to XVII German Army Corps, Chief Prisoner of War Section General Staff, and General Officer Commanding 10th Division. From 1945 to 1948, he was Deputy General Officer Commanding of first the 5th Corps Area, and then the 3rd Military Region. He retired on June 1, 1948.
