= Drăgășani Wine Museum =

Museum in Romania

Coordinates: 44.6609°N 24.2605°E

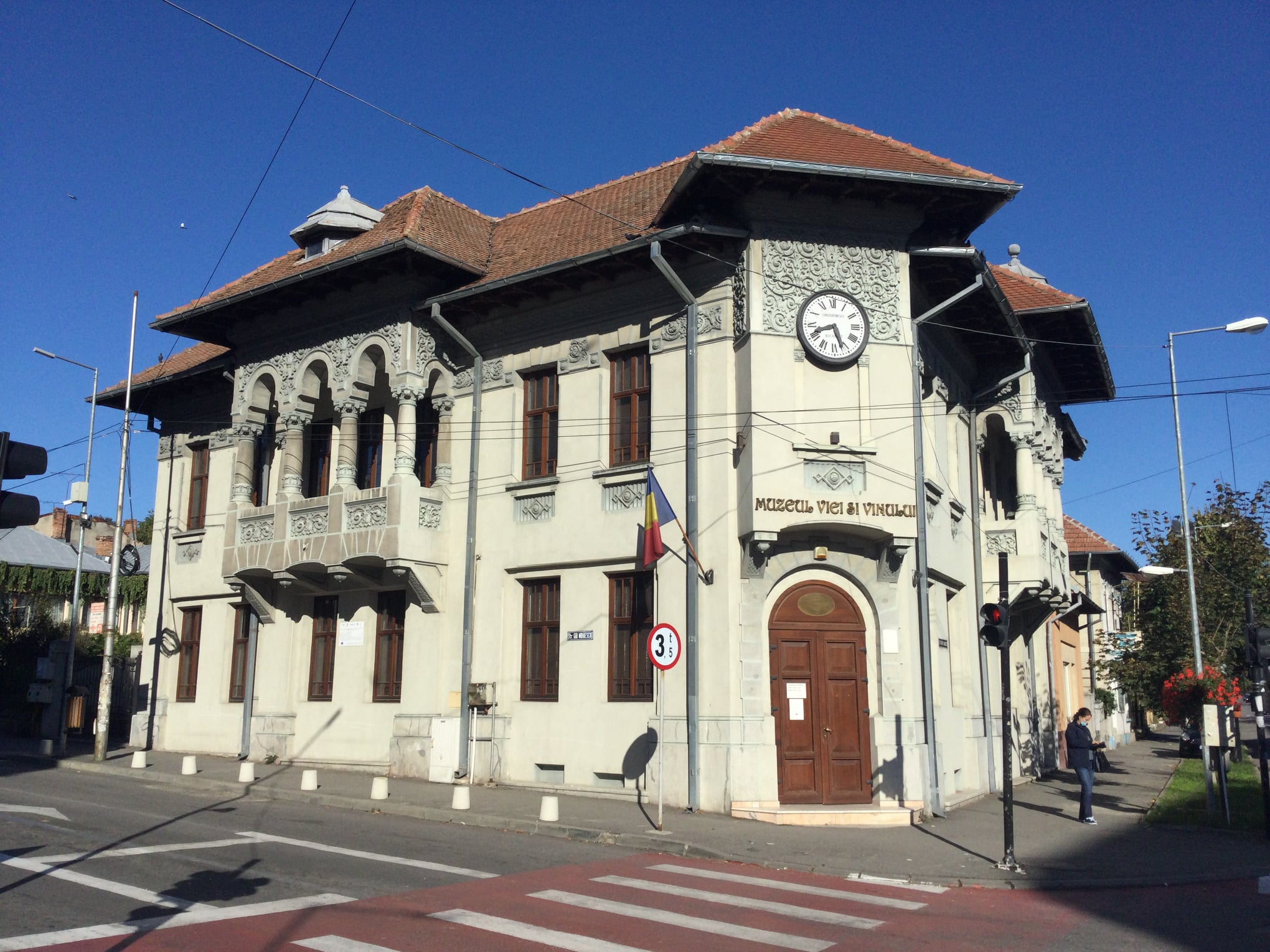
Drăgășani Wine Museum

The Drăgășani Wine Museum (Romanian: Muzeul Viei și Vinului) is a museum located at 22 Gib Mihăescu Street, Drăgășani, Romania.

The building housing the museum was completed before 1920 by Dumitru C. Popescu, a prosperous local merchant. It features the Neo-Brâncovenesc style. Early on, it was used for stores. After the onset of the communist regime, the local Militia was headquartered there. Converted into a museum in 1974, it opened to the public in 1983.

The museum traces its origins to the period after World War I, when a small display existed in a school. In 1952, two residents began putting together a collection. The current display focuses on the regional wine industry, and is divided into three sections: wine production, art, and archaeology.

The museum is listed as a historic monument by Romania's Ministry of Culture and Religious Affairs.
