= Kerch–Eltigen operation =

1943 military operation in World War II

- Part of the Eastern Front of World War II
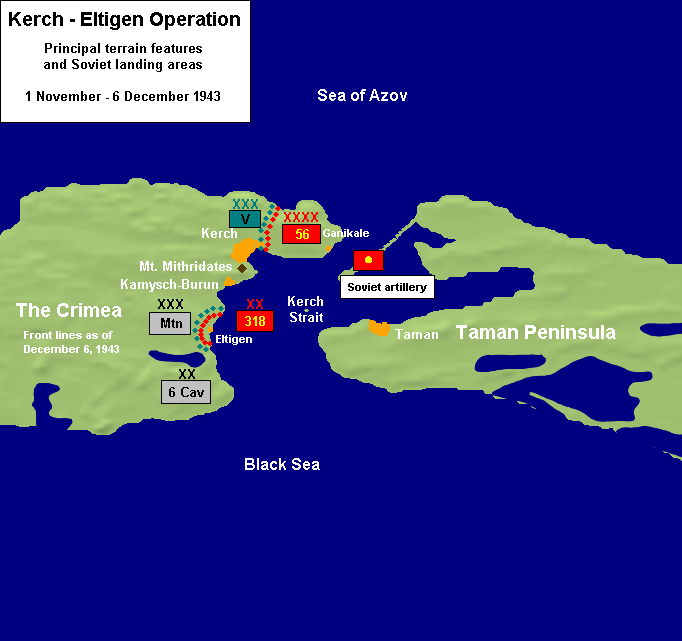
- Soviet landings in Crimea, 1943
Date	November 1943
Location	Kerch Peninsula, Soviet Union
Result	See § Aftermath

Belligerents
Soviet Union	Germany; Romania

Commanders and leaders
(Soviet Union) Ivan Petrov (Soviet Union) Ivan Isakov (Soviet Union) Lev Vladimirsky	(Nazi Germany) Erwin Jaenecke (Kingdom of Romania) Corneliu Teodorini

Units involved
Ground: 18th Army; 56th Army; Naval: Black Sea Fleet; Azov Flotilla	(Nazi Germany) V Army Corps (Nazi Germany) XLIX Mountain Corps (Kingdom of Romania) Mountain Corps

Strength
150,000; 45 assault guns	75,000+ 582 guns

Casualties and losses
6,985 killed or missing 20,412 sick or wounded 38 tanks captured 25 anti-tank guns captured Total: 27,397	Unknown

The Kerch–Eltigen operation was a World War II amphibious offensive made in November 1943 by the Red Army as a precursor to the Crimean offensive (8 April-12 May 1944), with the object of defeating and forcing the withdrawal of the German forces from the Crimea. Landing at two locations on the Crimea's eastern coast, the Red Army successfully reinforced the northern beachhead of Yenikale but was unable to prevent an Axis counterattack that collapsed the southern beachhead at Eltigen. Subsequently, the Red Army used the beachhead at Yenikale to launch further offensive operations into the Crimea in May 1944.

== Background ==
Following the defeat and withdrawal of German and Romanian troops from the Taman Peninsula in the fall of 1943, the Soviets decided to follow this success with two amphibious landings on the eastern coast of the Crimea as a prelude to the retaking of the entire Crimean Peninsula. The southern, diversionary assault was planned for the small town of Eltigen (now part of the city of Kerch) and the northern, main assault landed at Yenikale.

Soviet successes north of the Crimea had cut off the German 17th Army in Crimea, although the Axis forces were still supplied by sea. The 17th Army controlled the V Army Corps in the north, the XLIX Mountain Corps defended the Perekop Isthmus and the Romanian Mountain Corps defended the south and southeastern areas of the Crimea. The Germans also had anti-aircraft artillery batteries/operators and 45 assault guns to bolster their defence. Commanding the Axis forces were Generaloberst Erwin Jaenecke and Major-General Corneliu Teodorini.

== Soviet offensive ==
For the landings, the Soviet 4th Ukrainian Front employed the 18th (under Colonel-General Konstantin Leselidze, with Leonid Brezhnev as Chief Political Commissar) and 56th Armies, the Black Sea Fleet, and the Azov Flotilla. Commanding the 56th Army and overall on the Soviet side was General Ivan Petrov, and Vice Admiral Lev Vladimirsky for naval operations.

Despite poor weather and rough seas that postponed the landings, the Soviets succeeded in landing Colonel V. F. Gladkov's 318th Rifle Division of the 18th Army and the 386th Naval Infantry Battalion at Eltigen on 1 November. The landing was characterised by ad hoc use of naval craft of all kinds and the loss of formation organisation in the face of bad weather and darkness. Fighting their way ashore, the Soviet units pushed back the Romanian forces and established a small beachhead.

Two days later, at Yenikale, over 4,400 men of the Soviet 56th Army (landed were units of 2nd and 55th Guards Rifle Divisions, and the 32nd Rifle Division), enjoyed massed artillery support from positions on the Taman Peninsula and established a firm beachhead which the German V Army Corps and Romanian 3rd Mountain Division were unable to push back into the sea. By 11 November, the Soviets had landed 27,700 men in the Yenikale Beachhead. Among the reinforcing units was the 383rd Rifle Division which landed on 7 November, and the 339th Rifle Division, which crossed over the course of 6 to 8 November.

== Axis victory at Eltigen ==
Although the Red Army managed to land the 117th Guards Rifle Division's 335th Guards Rifle Regiment to reinforce the Eltigen Beachhead, they were unable to push farther than 2 km (1.2 mi) inland, a situation worsened when the German forces managed to establish a naval blockade around the landings with light craft of the 3rd Minesweeper Flotilla operating out of Kerch, Kamysh Burun, and Feodosiya. The Soviets countered by attempting to supply the beachhead at night, resulting in close-range naval encounters but completely insufficient to secure the delivery of supplies. Soviet attempts at aerial resupply were interdicted by the Luftwaffe.

The Axis forces besieged the beachhead for five weeks before attacking on 6 December. During the attack, Romanian cavalry of the 6th Division made diversionary attacks from the south while Romanian mountain troops supported by assault guns attacked from the west. By the 7 December, the beachhead had collapsed and the Romanians took 1,570 prisoners and counted 1,200 Soviet dead at a cost of 886 men to themselves. The Romanians also captured 25 anti-tank guns and 38 tanks.

== Battle of Mount Mithridates ==
In the course of the Eltigen Beachhead's collapse, some 820 Soviet troops managed to break out to the north in an attempt to reach Yenikale, occupying Mount Mithridates and defeating German artillery positions there. This alarmed General Jaenecke, as the attack had the potential of breaching the German front facing the Yenikale Beachhead. Jaenecke committed the Romanian 3rd Mountain Division to a counterattack against the Soviet troops. By the 11 December, the Romanians recaptured Mount Mithridates. An unknown number of these Soviet troops were subsequently evacuated to Opasnoe village in the Yenikale Beachhead by the Azov Flotilla under the command of Rear Admiral Sergey Gorshkov.

== Aftermath ==
In the face of strong German reinforcements, the Soviets contented themselves with reinforcing the Yenikale Beachhead. By the 4 December, the Soviets had landed 75,000 men, 582 guns, 187 mortars, 128 tanks, 764 trucks, and over 10,000 short tons (9,100 t) of munitions and material at Yenikale. The Soviets pushed some 9 km (5.6 mi) inland and to the outskirts of Kerch. Although the Germans succeeded in initially defending the Crimea against the Soviet landings, the successful landing near Kerch had placed the Soviets in a strong position from which they could push and conquer the entire Crimean Peninsula, an operation they successfully concluded in May 1944.

== Legacy ==
A minor planet 2217 Eltigen discovered in 1971 by Soviet astronomer Tamara Mikhaylovna Smirnova is named for the landing of Soviet troops in November 1943.

== Sources ==
- Soviet Amphibious Operations in the Black Sea, 1941-1943, Charles B. Atwater, Jr., thesis for the CSC, 1995.
- Axworthy, Mark; Scafeș, Cornel; Crăciunoiu, Cristian (1995). Third Axis, Fourth Ally: Romanian Armed Forces in the European War, 1941–1945. London: Arms & Armour. ISBN 1-85409-267-7.
- Forczyk, Robert (2013). Where the Iron Crosses Grow: The Crimea 1941–44. Oxford: Osprey. ISBN 9781782009757.
- Frieser, Karl-Heinz; Schmider, Klaus; Schönherr, Klaus [in German]; Schreiber, Gerhard; Ungváry, Kristián; Wegner, Bernd (2007). Die Ostfront 1943/44 – Der Krieg im Osten und an den Nebenfronten [The Eastern Front 1943–1944: The War in the East and on the Neighbouring Fronts]. Das Deutsche Reich und der Zweite Weltkrieg [Germany and the Second World War] (in German). Vol. VIII. München: Deutsche Verlags-Anstalt. ISBN 978-3-421-06235-2.
- Glantz, David M.; House, Jonathan M. (2015). When Titans Clashed: How the Red Army Stopped Hitler. Lawrence, Kansas: University Press of Kansas. ISBN 9780700621217 – via Project MUSE.
- Grechko, Andrei (1979). Geschichte des Zweiten Welt Krieges [German translation of Soviet official history of World War II] (in German). Vol. 7. Berlin: Militärverlag der DDR.
- Kuznetsov, Andrey (2011). Большой десант. Керченско-Эльтигенская операция [A Large Landing: The Kerch–Eltigen Operation] (in Russian). Moscow: Veche. ISBN 978-5-9533-5397-7.
- Schmadel, Lutz D. (2003). Dictionary of Minor Planet Names (5th ed.). New York: Springer Verlag. ISBN 3-540-00238-3.
