= Order of Michael the Brave =

Order of Michael the Brave Ordinul Mihai Viteazul
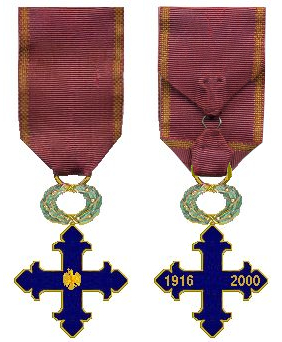
- Order of Michael the Brave, post-2000 (obverse and reverse)
- Type: Military Award
- Presented by: The King of Romania (1916 – 1947); The President of Romania (since 2000)
- Eligibility: Military personnel on active service
- Status: Awarded only in time of war
- Established: 1916, re-instituted 2000
- First award: 1916
- Final award: 1944 and disbanded in 1947
- Ribbon of the Order of Michael the Brave

Precedence
- Next (higher): None (Highest)
- Next (lower): Order of the Star of Romania

The Order of Michael the Brave (Romanian: Ordinul Mihai Viteazul) is Romania's highest military decoration, instituted by King Ferdinand I during the early stages of the Romanian Campaign of the First World War, and was again awarded in the Second World War. The Order, which may be bestowed either on an individual or on a whole unit, was named in honor of Michael the Brave (Mihai Viteazul), the late 16th-century Prince of Wallachia, Transylvania, and Moldavia.

== Data ==
Requirements: Awarded to officers only for exceptional deeds on the battlefield. It is the highest ranking Romanian military order.
Classes: 3rd, 2nd and 1st
Date Instituted: September 26, 1916
Number awarded: 2184

During WW1:

1st class: 16
2nd class: 12
3rd class: 336 (of which 43 awarded to military units)

During WW2:

1st class: 15
2nd class: 76 (of which 13 awarded to military units)
3rd class: 1628 (of which 118 awarded to military units)

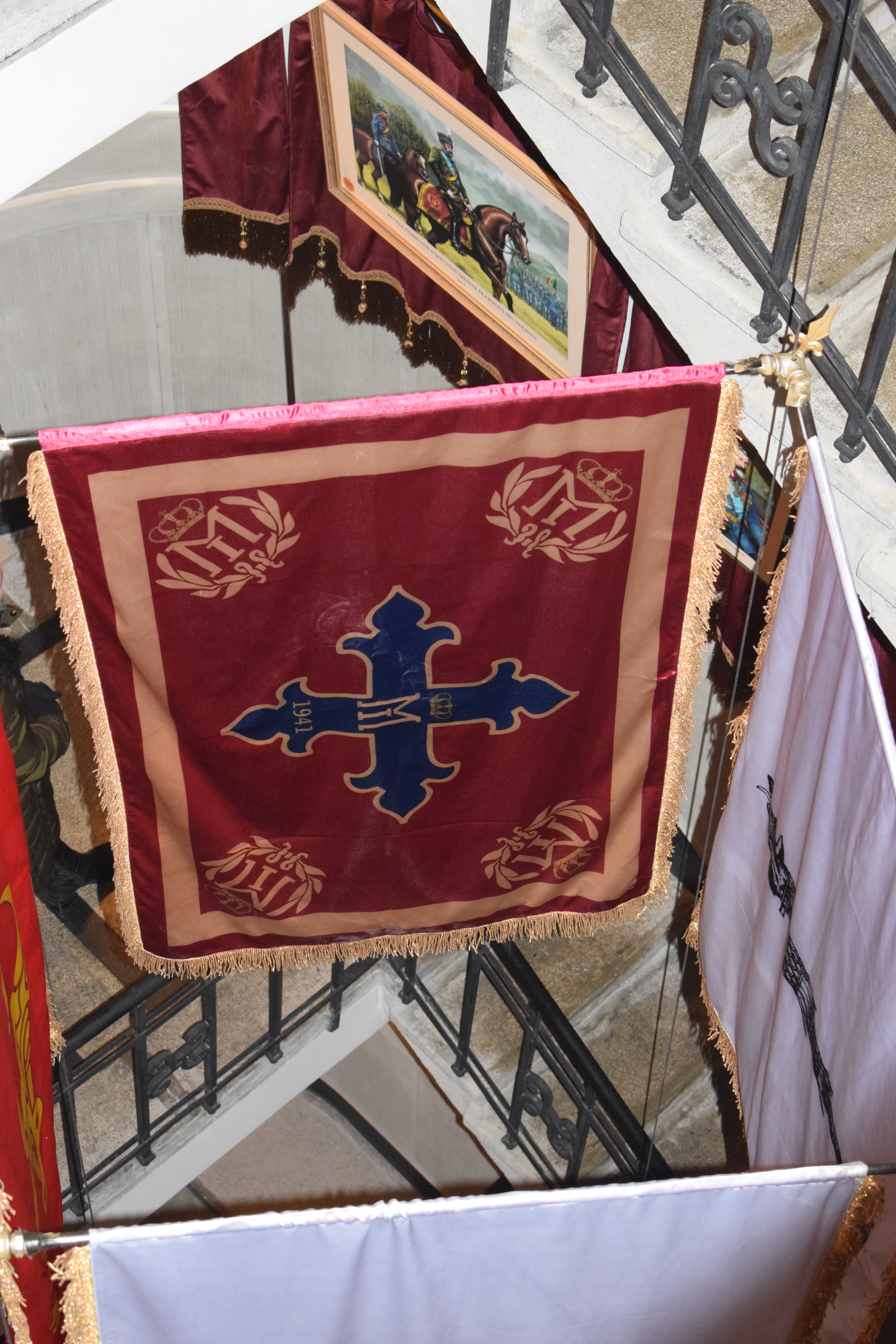
A 1941 war flag of the Knights of the Military Order "Mihai Viteazu" (Romania)

== Recipients ==
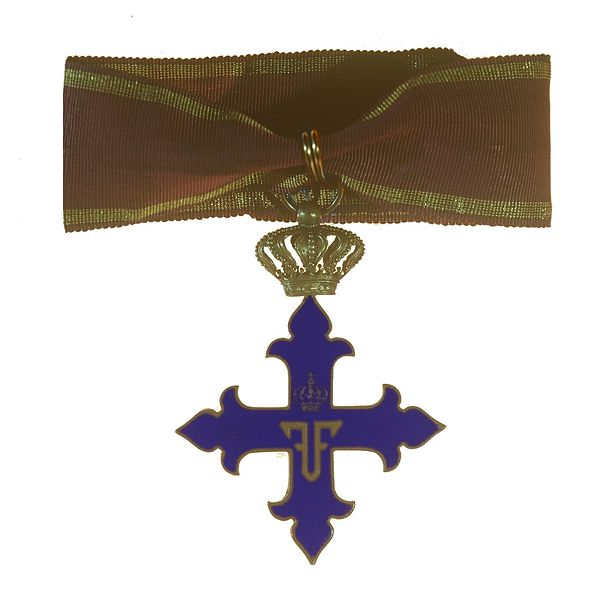
Order of Michael the Brave 2nd class (1916)

- Józef Piłsudski
- Ion Antonescu
- Josip Broz Tito
- Vasile Atanasiu
- Alexandru Averescu
- Radu Bâldescu
- Henri Mathias Berthelot
- Nicolae Dabija
- Corneliu Dragalina
- Grigore Gafencu
- Carl Gustaf Emil Mannerheim
- Eremia Grigorescu
- Douglas Haig
- Michael I of Romania (as Commander-in-Chief of the Romanian Army in 1941)
- John J. Pershing
- Radu Korne
- Mihail Lascăr
- Leonard Mociulschi
- Paolo Morrone
- Ioan Pălăghiţă
- Constantin Prezan
- Corneliu Teodorini
- Constantin Mihalcea
- Gheorghe Băgulescu
- Virgil Bădulescu

During the Second World War, while Romania was allied with Germany, the Order was awarded to several military members of other Axis powers, many in the Wehrmacht:

- Erwin Rommel
- Theodor Busse
- Fedor von Bock
- Walther von Brauchitsch
- Dietrich von Choltitz
- Karl Dönitz
- Hermann Göring
- Hermann Hoth
- Erich von Manstein
- Friedrich Paulus
- Wolfram von Richthofen
- Gerd von Rundstedt
- Wilhelm Schöning
- Walter Warlimont
- Paul Ludwig Ewald von Kleist
- Helmuth von Pannwitz
- Erwin Jaenecke

== See also ==
- List of military decorations
- List of Romanian decorations
