= Battle of Changde order of battle =

Opposing commanders

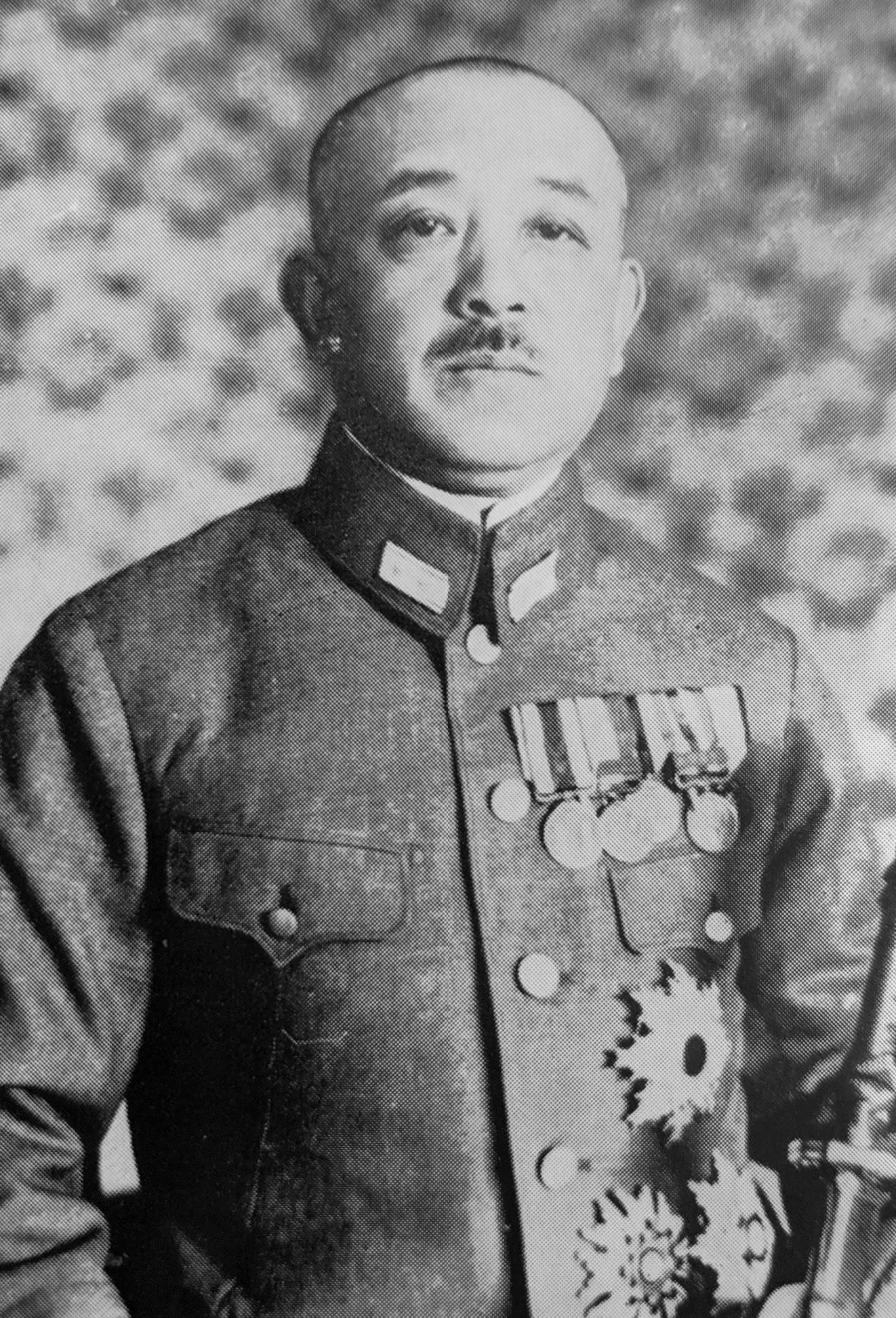
Lt. Gen. Yokoyama Isamu

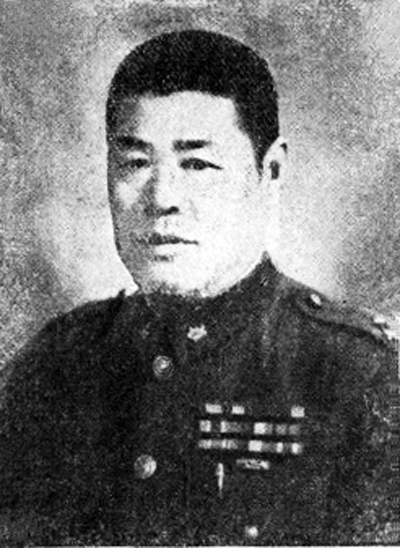
Gen. Sun Lianzhong

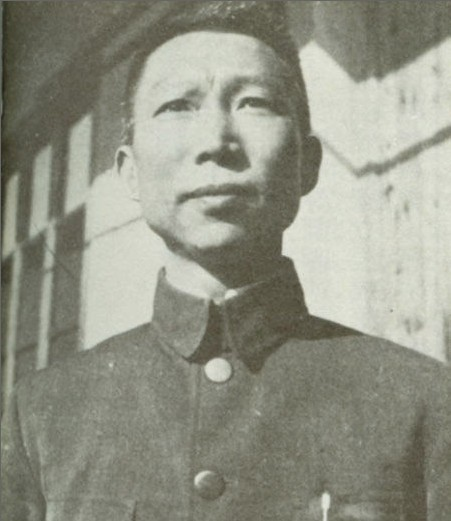
Gen. Xue Yue

The following units and commanders fought in the Battle of Changde in early November through late December 1943, part of the Second Sino-Japanese War.

== Japan ==
From end of October 1943.

=== Ground forces ===
Eleventh Army
Lieut. General Isamu Yokoyama

3rd Division
Lieut. General Mitsuo Yamamoto

3rd Infantry Brigade Group

6th Infantry Regiment
68th Infantry Regiment
34th Infantry Regiment

3rd Field Artillery Regiment
3rd Cavalry Regiment
3rd Engineer Regiment
3rd Transport Regiment

13th Division
Lieut. General Tsutomu Akashika

13th Infantry Brigade Group

65th Infantry Regiment
104th Infantry Regiment
116th Infantry Regiment

19th Mountain Artillery Regiment
17th Cavalry Regiment
13th Engineer Regiment
13th Transport Regiment

32nd Division (elements)
Lieut. Gen. Yoshio Ishii

32nd infantry Brigade Group

210th Infantry Regiment
211th Infantry Regiment
212th Infantry Regiment

32nd Recon Regiment
32nd Field Artillery Regiment
32nd Transport Regiment
32nd Transport Regiment

34th Division (elements)
Lieut. General Takeo Ban

34th infantry Brigade Group

216th Infantry Regiment
217th Infantry Regiment
218th Infantry Regiment

34th Recon Regiment
34th Field Artillery Regiment
24th Transport Regiment
34th Transport Regiment

39th Division
Lieut. General Raishiro Sumida

39th Infantry Brigade Group

231st Infantry Regiment
232nd Infantry Regiment
233rd Infantry Regiment

39th Recon Regiment
39th Field Artillery Regiment
39th Military Engineer Regiment
39th Transport Regiment

40th Division (elements)
Lieut. General Seiichi Aoki

40th Infantry Brigade Group

234th Infantry Regiment
235th Infantry Regiment
236th Infantry Regiment

40th Cavalry Regiment
40th Mountain Artillery Regiment
40th Military Engineer Regiment
40th Transport Regiment

68th Division
Lieut. General Tamejin Sakuma

57th Infantry Brigade

61st Independent Infantry Battalion
62nd Independent Infantry Battalion
63rd Independent Infantry Battalion
64th Independent Infantry Battalion

58th Infantry Brigade

65th Independent Infantry Battalion
115th Independent Infantry Battalion
116th Independent Infantry Battalion
117th Independent Infantry Battalion

Labor troops
Signal communication unit
Transport team

116th Division
Lieut. General Hiroshi Iwanaga

116th Infantry Brigade Group

109th Infantry Regiment
120th Infantry Regiment
133rd Infantry Regiment

122nd Field Artillery regiment
116th Military Engineer Regiment
116th Transport Regiment

17th Independent Mixed Brigade (elements)
Lieut. General Kenichi Kishigawa

87th Infantry Battalion
88th Infantry Battalion
89th Infantry Battalion
90th Infantry Battalion
91st Infantry Battalion
Independent artillery troops
Independent labor troops
Independent signal communication unit

=== Naval forces ===
100 motorboats and junks

== China ==
As of end of October 1943.

=== Ground forces ===
National Military Council

Sixth War Area
General Sun Lianzhong

29th Army Group
Wang Tsan-hu

44th Corps – Wang Zezhun

105th Division
161st Division

162nd Division
73rd Corps – Wang Zhibin

15th Division
77th Division
5th Provincial Division

10th Army Group
Wang Jingjiu

79th Corps – Wang Jiaben

98th Division
194th Division
6th Provincial Division

66th Corps – Fang Jing

185th Division
199th Division

River Defence Force
Wu Jiwei

18th Corps – Luo Guangwen

118th Division
18th Division
55th Division

86th Corps – Zhu Dingjin

13th Division

26th Army Group
Zhou Ai

75th Corps – Liu Jiming

6th Division
16th Division
4th Reserve Division

32nd Corps – Song Gendang

139th Division
141st Division

33rd Army Group
Feng Zhi'an

59th Corps – Liu Chen-san

38th Division
180th Division
34th Provincial Division

79th Corps – He Jifeng

30th Division
132nd Division
179th Division

Wang Yaowu's Army

74th Corps – Wang Yaowu

51st Division
57th Division (Defended Changde)
58th Division

100th Corps – Shi Zhongzheng

19th Division
63rd Division

Ninth War Area
General Xue Yue

Li Yutang's Army

99th Corps – Liang Hanming

92nd Division
197th Division
54th Provincial Division

10th Corps – Fang Xianjue

3rd Division
190th Division

10th Reserve Division

Ou Zhen's Army
Ou Chen

58th Corps – Lu Daoyuan

New 10th Division
New 11th Division

72nd Corps – Fu Yi

New 13th Division
New 15th Division

7th Provincial Division – Wang Zuohua

=== Air forces ===
100 bombers and fighters

== Sources ==
=== Print ===
- Hsu Long-hsuen and Chang Ming-kai (1971). History of The Sino-Japanese War (1937-1945). Translated by Wen Ha-hsiung (2nd ed.). Chung Wu Publishing. pp. 412–416, Map 38.

=== Web ===
- "抗日战争时期的侵华日军序列沿革 (Japanese army that invaded China)". Archived from the original on 2007-09-28.
- "Generals from Japan". The Generals of World War II.
- "Battle of Changde". Axis History Forum.
