= Battle of Hengyang =

1944 battle in mainland China

Coordinates: 26.89°N 112.57°E

- Part of of Operation Ichi-Go in the Second Sino-Japanese War of World War II
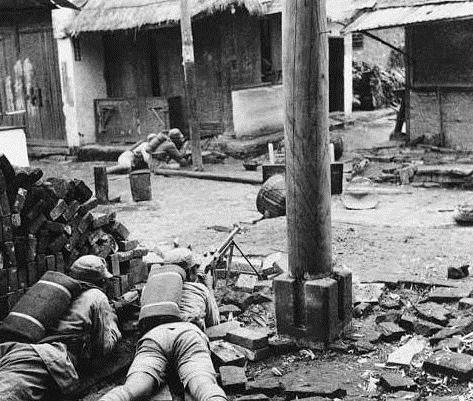
- Chinese soldiers open fire with a captured Japanese machine gun
Date	June 23 – August 8, 1944 (1 month, 2 weeks and 2 days)
Location	Hengyang city, Hunan province, Republic of China
Result	Japanese victory
Territorial changes	Japanese capture of Hengyang

Belligerents
(Republic of China (1912–1949)) Republic of China; United States (air support only)	Empire of Japan

Commanders and leaders
(Republic of China (1912–1949)) Fang Xianjue	(Empire of Japan) Isamu Yokoyama

Strength
10th Army, 16,275 men	11th Army, 110,000+ men

Casualties and losses
Japanese source: Approximately 4,100 abandoned corpses (excluding many bodies buried by the Chinese Army); Approximately 13,300 captured (including wounded and sick); Chinese sources: 10th army's battle report : More than 11,000 killed in action or died from various causes after being wounded; More than 3,000 wounded who had not recovered; Post-war estimate : 7,400 killed in action; 1,000 severely wounded who were killed in hospital; 5,000 captured and tortured to death; 3,000 captured and escaped	Japanese source: 19,000 dead and wounded Chinese sources: 10th army's battle report : More than 25,000 killed or wounded; 43 captured and shot before the capture of Hengyang; Post-war claim : 48,000–60,000 dead and wounded
- 3,174 civilian volunteers killed

The Battle of Hengyang (Chinese: 衡陽保衛戰) 23 June – 8 August 1944 was fought between Chinese and Japanese forces in mainland China during World War II. Although the city fell, Japanese casualties far exceeded the total number of Chinese troops defending the city. It has been described as "the most savage battle ever fought in the smallest battlefield with the greatest casualties in the military history of the world". Japanese military historians equate it to the most arduous battle in the Russo-Japanese War, calling it a "Battle of Ryojun in South China". A major Chinese newspaper of the day compared it to the Battle of Stalingrad.

== Strategic importance ==
Hengyang in Hunan Province lies in an oval basin surrounded by mountains and hills, with Guangdong and Guangxi to the south, Guizhou and Yunnan to the west, and Jiangxi and Shanghai to the east. The city proper sits where two rivers merge into the Xiang River, a major tributary of the Yangtze. Such a unique geographical position destined Hengyang to be a strategic crossroads throughout China's history, a must for industrial and commercial enterprises to use as a home base and for military forces to control.

In the 1930s, the Japanese occupation of major East Coast cities such as Shanghai, Nanjing, and Wuhan forced China's industries to relocate inland. The Chiang Kai-shek government chose Hengyang to be a light industry center. By the beginning of 1944, both banks of the Xiang River for ten miles had been built up with mills and factories. The bustling commercial activities brought the city the nickname "Little Shanghai".

That same decade, two major railway lines, Wuhan-Guangzhou and Hunan-Guangxi, were built that met in Hengyang, further elevating the strategic importance of the city as a gateway to Guangxi, Guizhou, Yunnan and Sichuan. A Chinese failure to hold the city could result in the Japanese crossing into Guilin and driving west towards Guizhou, from where they could directly attack Chongqing, thus placing the Chinese wartime capital and military headquarters in imminent danger.

== Ichigo plan ==
By the summer of 1943, American military forces on the Pacific front had won a great victory against Japan in the Guadalcanal campaign and continued to advance into the western Pacific. On November 25, the US Air Force, from a base in eastern China, bombed a Japanese naval base in Taiwan. All this caused great anxiety in the upper echelon of the Imperial Japanese Armed Forces. They realized that Japan must now set up an overland transport route through central China and destroy the American air bases there. In January 1944, the Japanese military plan "Ichigo" was drawn up and approved by the emperor. Two phases were projected: Henan Campaign aiming at the control of Beijing-Wuhan Railway, and Hunan-Guangxi Campaign to take over Wuhan-Guangzhou and Hunan-Guangxi Railways.

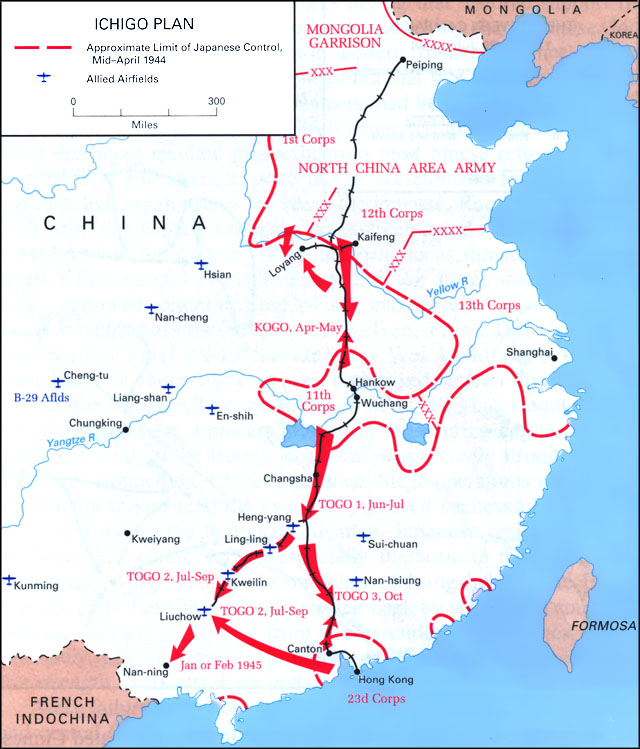
Ichigo_plan

Ichigo was formally put into action on 17 April. Japanese troops met with hardly any effective Chinese resistance during the subsequent six weeks, and on 26 May Japan launched the offensive on Hunan with forces growing to "80,000 to 90,000". Changsha fell on June 18, and two days later, when the order came to take Hengyang, Lieutenant General Isamu Yokoyama (橫山 勇) expected the battle to last no more than a day.

== Allied leadership ==
As Japan was launching its daring Ichigo Operation in China, Chinese supreme commander Generalissimo Chiang Kai-shek was mired in struggles on almost every front. A memorandum by the Office of Strategic Services on April 4, 1944 describes Chiang as being "under great strain", and even "half crazy".

Even before Pearl Harbor, the US government had started quietly helping China by sending the American Volunteer Group (AVG) of aviators and technicians, led by Claire Chennault and popularly known as the Flying Tigers. Once the U.S. had entered the war, American General Joseph Stilwell became chief of staff to Chiang Kai-shek and U.S. Commander of the China-Burma-India Theater (CBI). Tensions soon began to rise. A defeat of the Allied troops in Burma, including the Chinese 5th and 6th Armies, said by Chiang to be China's crack troops, made Stilwell obsessed with avenging his failure. In most of his tenure in the CBI, only Burma was his priority.

In the months leading up to the epic Battle of Hengyang, Americans stepped up their pressure on the Chiang government for two things: sending his Yunnan forces to Burma and allowing American observers to go to Yanan to make contact with Chinese Communist leaders. Roosevelt's April 3 letter was quickly followed by General Marshall's instruction to Stilwell that air supplies over "The Hump" from British India would cease if Chiang did not order his Yunnan forces to move into Burma. The pressure finally became unbearable, and on April 15, 1944, two days before Ichigo began, the Yunnan forces, one of Chiang's best-equipped and best-trained armies, left China.

Chiang Kai-shek's only consolation and trust lay in Chennault, who by now had become the head of the newly established U.S. 14th Air Force in China. Chennault's antagonism towards Stilwell was fully displayed in his letter to Roosevelt on 26 January 1944, urging that Stilwell be replaced. As the 14th Air Force exerted every bit of its strength but failed to halt the aggressively advancing Japanese troops, Chennault blamed Stilwell for not allocating enough materials to his forces.

The total collapse of Chinese armies in the Henan Campaign and rapid fall of Changsha exposed Chiang Kai-shek's perilous state on the home front. The military was rife with corruption, low morale, disobedience, lack of discipline, top officers deserting their command posts, and even high-ranking commanders disobeying his orders. While losing control of his own armies, the Generalissimo also was losing the trust of the U.S. On 6 July, with the Battle of Hengyang raging, President Roosevelt telegraphed Chiang Kai-shek, requesting him to make Stilwell the commander of all Chinese and American forces.

In the meantime, the supreme commanders of China's Ninth, Seventh, and Fourth War Areas, together with high-ranking politician Li Jishen, were also plotting to seize power from Chiang Kai-shek. The idea of setting up a sort of separate government was thrown out early in 1944 and fermented through spring and summer. Those initiators informed Stilwell and asked him for American equipment, to which Stilwell agreed.

It was in the middle of this conflict among the leadership that the Battle of Hengyang was fought.

== American involvement ==
By the Lei River on the east side of Hengyang lay an airfield, first built in 1934. In March 1943 when the American 14th Air Force was formally established, the airfield was significantly upgraded for heavy bombers and became a base for the Chinese-American Composite Wing (Provisional), who inherited the nickname "Flying Tigers". At its peak, Hengyang Airfield held 400 planes including bombers, fighters, and photo reconnaissance, with more than 2,000 pilots and ground personnel.

As early as 6 May 1944, when the Allies became better aware of the Japanese military goals, the Hengyang squadron pilots started extensive and intensive bombing and strafing missions. For six weeks, they bombed Japanese military storage areas, supply barges and gunboats; strafed Japanese troops; and engaged in dogfights. On June 17, the Japanese bombed the Hengyang air base heavily, and the squadron was ordered to evacuate. They flew back to bomb the base on June 22, the day before the Battle of Hengyang formally began, so it could not be used by the advancing Japanese troops.

The 14th Air Force continued to fly missions all through the Battle of Hengyang, attacking Japanese supply lines along the Yangtze and Xiang rivers and supporting Chinese defensive positions around Hengyang, taking a heavy toll of Japanese. Japanese air strength had to be dedicated to defensive activity, denying air cover to front line Japanese forces. The Chinese defenders agreed: "The American-Chinese Air Force dominance in the air during the daytime gave Japanese troops no choice but to attack at night, which made offensives more difficult. ... Hengyang would not have held out for 47 days without Chennault and his Flying Tigers."

The ground troops defending Hengyang especially credited Brigadier General Earl S. Hoag, who commanded the India–China Division, Air Transport Command. Visiting Hengyang a week before the battle on a supply inspection tour, Hoag put the Chinese in direct radio communication with Zhijiang Airport (Chinese: 芷江机场), which could relay their messages to Chongqing.

Also active and contributing to the city before the battle were American missionaries and medical staff working at Ren Ji Hospital, run by the Presbyterian church. The hospital evacuated at the beginning of June 1944, when Hunan Campaign had already begun and roads and transportation facilities were extremely congested. The equipment and medicines left behind, particularly sulfa drugs, greatly helped wounded soldiers to recover fast, an indirect factor in Hengyang holding out for so long.

== Tenth Army, Chinese National Revolutionary Army ==
Ordered to defend Hengyang was the 10th Army of the Chinese National Revolutionary Army, formally established in 1940. (The Chinese word "军" is usually translated as "army", although it is only the size of an army corps in the military of other countries. The Kuomintang Order of Battle entry in the Pacific War Online Encyclopedia has a discussion of this.) The Army was built on the foundation of the 190th Division that had won the title "Division of Bravery and Loyalty" in the Battle of Wuhan in 1938. Having played a decisive role in the victory at the Third Battle of Changsha at the end of 1941, the 10th Army was awarded the honorary title "Mt. Tai Army". Mt. Tai, one of the Five Sacred Mountains in China, symbolizes reverence and respect.

Lieutenant General Fang Xianjue, commander of the 10th Army, was also well known to Hunan people. In the fiercest life-and-death moment during the Third Battle of Changsha, Fang, then a major general commanding the 10th Reserve Division, wrote his "last" letter to his wife after promising the Supreme Commander of the Ninth War Area, General Xue, to hold his battle lines for a week. The letter was published under the heading "Determined to Defend Changsha to his Death, Commander Fang Made his Will" on the first page of Changsha Daily on 2 January 1942.

Fang's promotion in 1942 was resented by 190th Division Deputy Commander Zhu, a General Xue confidante. This sowed seeds of trouble for Fang. In the Battle of Changde the following year, the 10th Army failed in a rescue mission mainly because Zhu delayed carrying out Fang's orders. Flying into a rage, Fang threatened to execute Zhu. This offended Xue, who then convinced Chiang Kai-shek to remove Fang from his command. But when Japan launched the Hunan Campaign, Fang's replacement changed his mind and declined the new appointment. Xue had to ask Fang to resume his post, but Fang refused. On the night of 29 May 1944, Chiang Kai-shek called Fang directly from Chongqing, ordering him to resume his command and deploy to Hengyang immediately. He should prepare to defend the city for ten days to two weeks.

At the time of its deployment, the 10th Army was still undergoing the process of replenishment. It had suffered immense losses, including the death of the commander of its 10th Reserve Division, in the Changde battle. The 190th Division was being reorganized, with only one regiment complete and the other two waiting for new recruits. One regiment of the 54th Division that happened to be stationed in Hengyang was ordered to take part in the defense under Fang's command. However, the commander, said to be close to General Xue, allowed two battalions to leave after Hengyang airfield was lost on the third day of the battle, leaving only a single battalion in Hengyang.

Including in the combat strength of the 10th Army were also one field artillery battalion, one mountain artillery battalion, and one anti-tank company. On paper, the corps had 4 divisions, but in reality it only had the strength of 7 regiments. Not included in the specific number of "16,275 men" provided by Hengyang historian Pei Xiao was a battalion of 700 troops from the 46th Army deployed to nearby Hengshan on 14 June as a force under Fang's command to deter advancing Japanese.

== Defenses ==
An official order to defend Hengyang reached the 10th Army from the National Military Council on May 31, and troops started marching to the city that night. The mayor of Hengyang organized a hearty welcome as the 10th Army entered the city. Immediately afterwards, General Fang took his chief of staff and division commanders to reconnoiter the surrounding terrain.

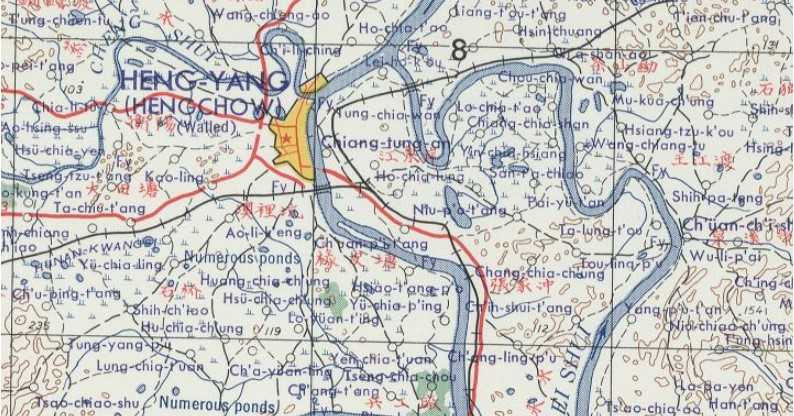
Map of Hengyang China

Formally becoming a municipality in 1942, Hengyang occupied an area of 23 square kilometers, but the city proper measured only 0.5 kilometers east to west and 1.6 kilometers north to south. Rivers lie to the east and north of the city. On the north and west sides were vast flooded rice fields and marshlands full of fish and covered with lotuses. At the southern end of the western boundary, the topography changed to hills stretching for about a kilometer up to the Xiang River that formed the eastern boundary.

After two days' terrain reconnaissance, the senior officers of the 10th Army concluded that Japanese forces might attack Hengyang from either the northwest or south and southwest. General Fang was sure of the latter, which became the rationale for his troop deployment and defense preparations. The two understrength divisions, the 190th and 54th, were deployed to the east of the Xiang River, with the 54th still defending the airfield. The two full-strength divisions, the 10th and 3rd, were posted to the west of the Xiang. With a long-term strategy in mind, Fang deployed the 10th Reserve Division, the weaker of the two, to the major frontline on the south and southwest; and the stronger 3rd Division to the secondary battleline on the north and west, ready to provide relief and support.

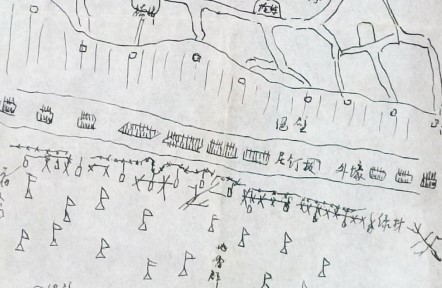
Fang's moat, June 1944

General Fang set strict standards for defense works: For the rice fields and marshlands on the north and west, dig through and connect ponds and rice fields to make large, flooded areas, and build pillboxes on all in-between footpaths. For the rolling hills on the south and south-west, build bunkers linked by trenches, with machine guns deployed on summits flanking saddles so as to create tight killing zones over open grounds. The sides of all the hills facing the enemy should be cut to sheer cliffs, with trenches on top for soldiers to throw grenades from. Ditches five meters deep and five meters wide, dearly called "Fang's Moats" by his men, should be dug further out all along the south and southwest, with pillboxes at the edge to deny the enemy any chance to hide inside. Fill them with water or place spikes at the bottom. On the enemy side of the moats, build two or three layers of barbed wire and abatises. In most outside areas, lay mines. (See External links: "Mr.Tan's Talks on Military History, episode 130" for more information.)

Around mid-June, Chang Kai-shek sent Mr. Yu, his head of Logistics, to Hengyang to help with supplies. With Chang's order in hand, Mr. Yu had all the nearby military warehouses to send whatever 10th Army wanted. As a result, the 10th Army received 5.3 million machine gun bullets, 3,200 mortar shells, and 28,000 hand grenades which were going to play an enormous role in the battle.

== Civilian evacuation ==
On 18 June, Changsha fell. War was now imminent for Hengyang. General Fang decided to evacuate all Hengyang residents. This would avoid civilian casualties, allowing military forces to completely focus on combat fighting, and prevent traitors and spies from hiding amongst the civilian population. The 10th Army requested the railways to provide free rides, and staff members and companies directly under the Headquarters were sent to the railway stations to help the old and young to board. Within four days and nights, the 300,000 Hengyang population was evacuated.

Reuters journalist Graham Barrow witnessed the evacuation of Hengyang in person: "I was lying asleep by the railway station one night in the rain, then I woke up because there was a train going by. They were stuffed on roofs and in boxcars. They had lashed themselves to couplings between cars. There were refugees on the cowcatcher in front; underneath the trains they had laid some boards across the rods between the wheels. They stretched their mattresses on the boards and there they were, lying one on top of the other between the rods and trains."

Before the mass evacuation, the mayor of Hengyang called for volunteers to assist the 10th Army in their fighting. 32,000 Hengyang citizens signed up and stayed behind. The mayor organized them into six teams: transporting munitions, fixing damaged defense works, extinguishing fires, carrying stretchers, attending to wounded soldiers, and collecting corpses.

== Battle ==
On 20 June 1944, the Japanese commander, Lieutenant General Yokoyama of the 11th Imperial Army, issued the operational deployment for Hengyang: his troops should take the city rapidly, annihilating any Chinese reinforcements on their way. The 116th Division was to attack the city from the southwest, and the 68th Division from the east to take Wuhan-Guangzhou railway and Hengyang Airfield. The 218th Regiment was to occupy the east end of the railway bridge to assist the 68th Division with crossing the Xiang River.

According to Japanese military historians, a Japanese regiment had the fighting strength equivalent to a Chinese division. Therefore, the Japanese forces initially deployed to attack Hengyang already outgunned the Chinese defenders by a ratio of almost two and a half to one. Knowing that his 116th and 68th divisions were among his strongest forces, Lieutenant General Yokoyama believed that Hengyang would be taken within one day.

On 22 June, the Imperial Japanese Army Air Service dropped incendiary bombs on the city, burning many houses to the ground. At eight that evening, the advance troops of the Japanese 68th Division arrived at the eastern outskirts of the city. Early next morning, on 23 June, 68th Division was trying to cross the Lei River when a Chinese battalion from the 190th Division fired at them and their boats. The Battle of Hengyang had begun.

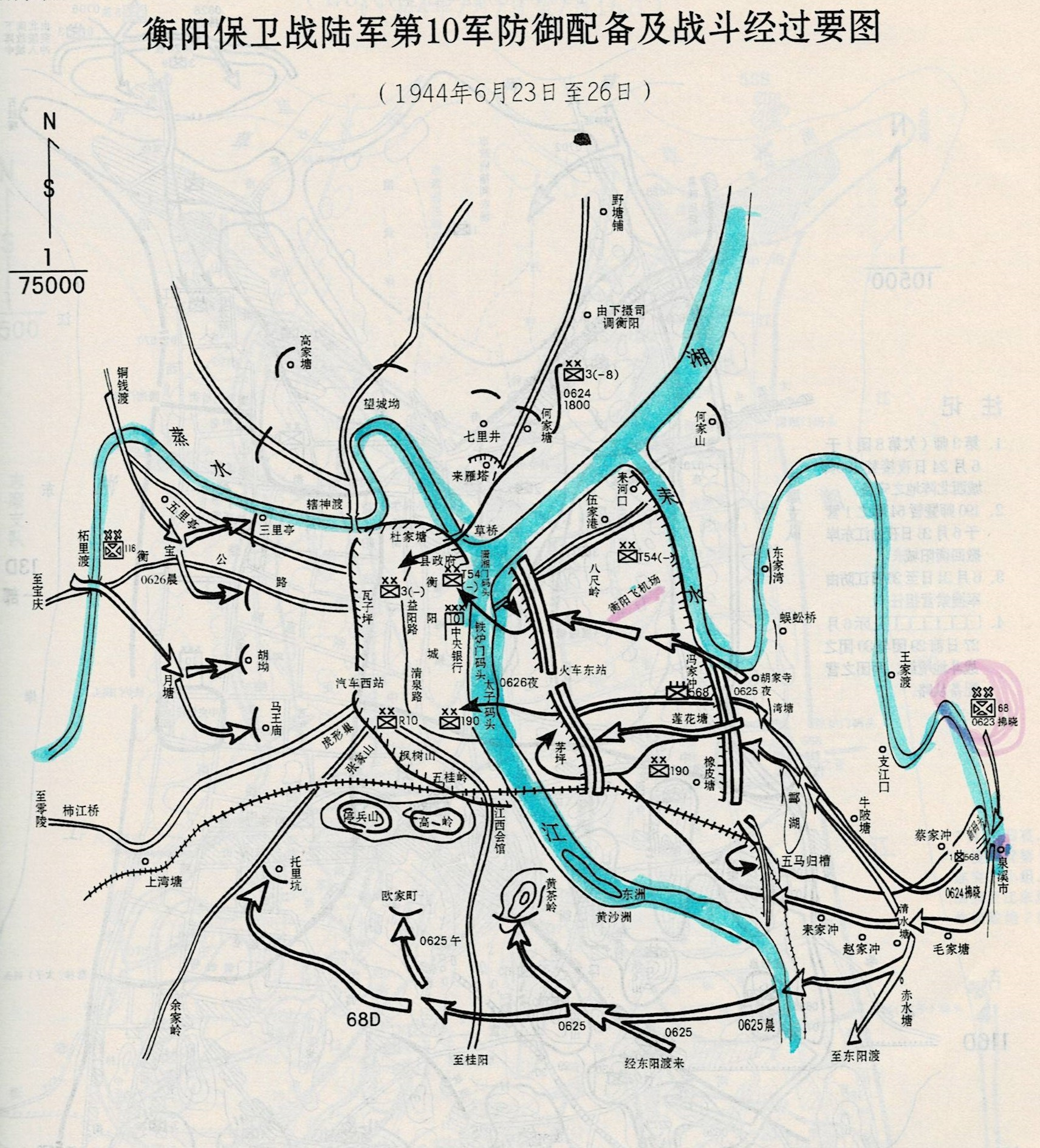
Battle of Hengyang map June 23–26, 1944

The next four days, the Japanese Air Service continued bombing Hengyang, and its infantry deployed poison gas repeatedly. Once they crossed the Lei River, the 68th Division moved in two prongs: one northwest to attack the Airfield, and the other toward the west and southwest to cross the Xiang River and take the city from the south. On the map, the place where fighting began is circled in red, and the red underline is the airfield.

In the fighting at the airfield, two of the three battalions of the Chinese 54th Division fled, leaving only one battalion in position. General Fang sent the 570th Regiment of 190th Division to reinforce, but intelligence smuggled out by a spy hidden in the regiment helped the Japanese take the airfield quickly. In the south, the small Chinese reconnaissance forces retreated from outposts to their main positions after brief skirmishes. On the night of the 25th, Lieutenant General Sakuma Tamehito (佐久间为人), commander of the 68th Division, moved his headquarters to Huangcha Hill (Chinese: 黄茶岭), the southernmost hill in Hengyang. Early the next morning, he began an offensive, with air bombing and artillery shelling paving the way for infantry charges. The 30th Regiment of the 10th Reserve Division deployed at the frontline in the southern hills, especially the two forward positions, Mt. Gao (Chinese: 高岭) and Mt. Tingbing (Chinese: 停兵山), fought back hard. The two officers commanding the defense of Mt. Gao and Mt. Tingbing swore to "live and die with the stronghold". At the end of the day, about 600 Japanese soldiers lay dead at the foot of the two hills, and casualties for the Chinese company reached 50%.

By 1:00 am, 27 June, the whole Chinese platoon fighting at Mt. Gao had died, and immediately the 68th Division launched large scale attacks at the Chinese 30th Regiment's positions at Jiangxi Hall (Chinese: 江西会馆), Wugui Hill (Chinese: 五桂岭), and Mt. Fengshu (Chinese: 枫树山). Seeing Japanese soldiers organized in groups of thirty rushing in wave upon wave and knowing his own forces were stretched thin with limited ammunition, the regiment commander ordered a "Three Don't-shoot" policy: Don't shoot when you cannot see clearly, don't shoot when you cannot aim accurately, and don't shoot when you are unsure of killing. He insisted on allowing the enemy to sabotage barricades and enter the moat before shooting at them. When the surviving Japanese started climbing the cliff, he ordered his men to throw hand grenades. His strategy worked. At dawn, about a thousand Japanese corpses were seen at the foot of each hill.

On the afternoon of that day, all the Japanese deployed to take Hengyang had arrived: the 68th Division on the south, 116th southwest, and the 57th brigade of the 68th Division on northwest. The two division commanders, Lieutenant General Sakuma Tamehito of the 68th Division and Lieutenant General O Iwanaga of the 116th Division, agreed to launch a general attack the following day and expected to take Hengyang within three days.

=== First Japanese offensive 28 June – 2 July ===
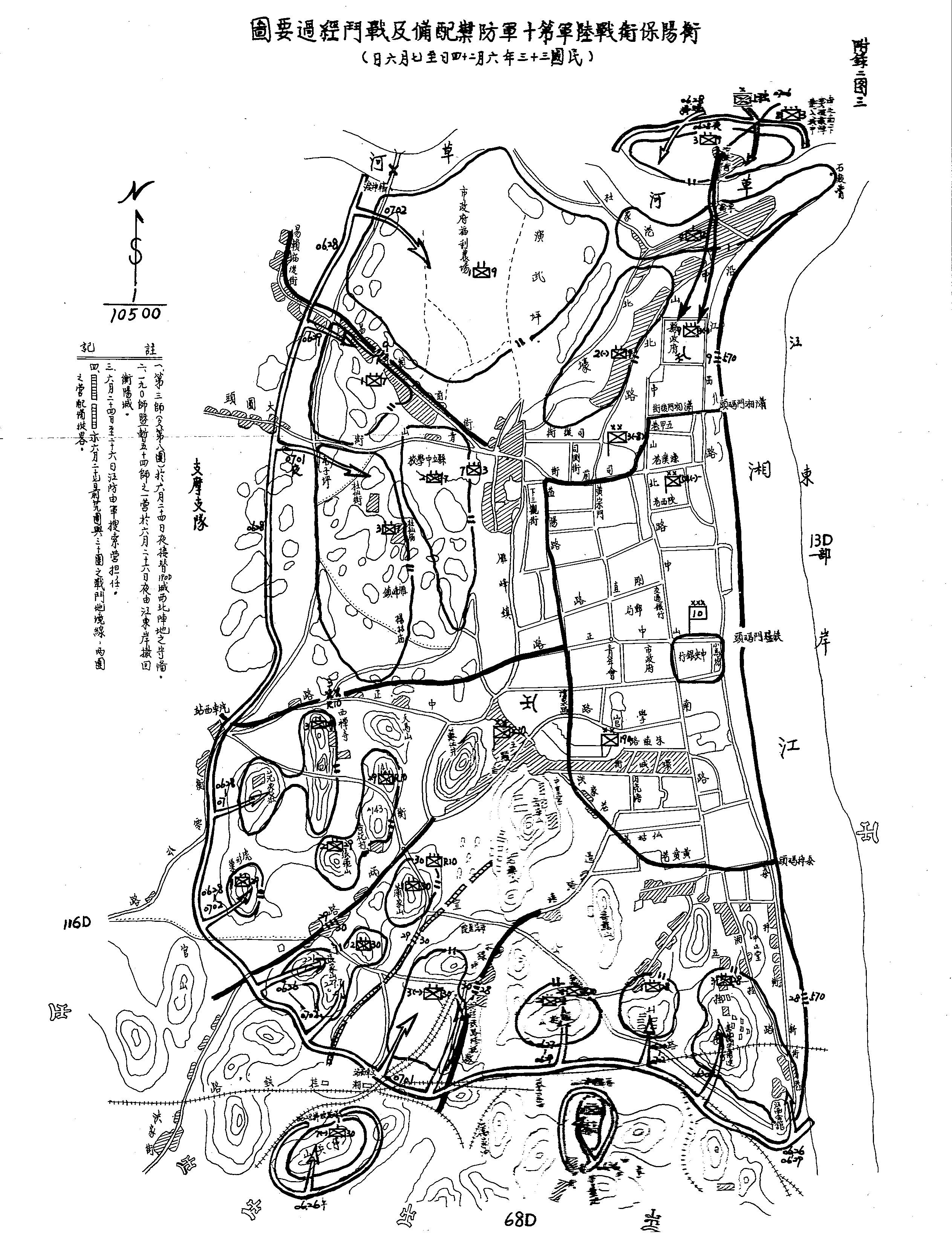
Battle of Hengyang June 24 - July 6, 1944

Before dawn on 28 June, the 117th battalion of the Japanese 68th Division charged the second forward position at Mt. Tingbing, held fast for the previous two days by the 7th company of the 30th Regiment. After an artillery barrage destroyed most of the barricades, Japanese infantry rushed onto the battlefield. Hand-to-hand combat ensued until the last four Chinese, including the company commander, died. Japanese casualties for that stronghold were about ten times as many as Chinese.

At 10:30 am, Lieutenant General Sakuma Tamehito took his chief of staff Colonel Saburo Harada (原田贞三郎) and a few other senior officers to Oujiating Heights (Chinese: 欧家町) near their headquarters to reconnoiter Chinese southern hill positions for their next move. Shortly, rounds of mortar shells from the Chinese positions landed on them, critically wounding all the Japanese officers. The command system of the 68th Division collapsed instantly before Lieutenant General Yokoyama urgently appointed Commander O Iwanaga (岩永旺)of the 116th Division to oversee both divisions. Already fully occupied with his own division and unfamiliar with the 68th, O Iwanaga could only appoint various deputies and order them to go ahead with their original plan.

The Japanese assaults typically followed their textbook principles and training drills: air bombing, heavy artillery, incendiary bombs and poison gas until Chinese troops should have become half paralyzed, then infantry charges onto the Chinese positions. The Chinese would usually stay in bunkers and trenches first to avoid bombs and shells and wait until Japanese artillery shells began to fall behind their positions. Then, they would get into position to shoot or throw hand grenades, or even leap out of trenches to conduct hand-to-hand combat. Because of the presence of the 14th Air Force during the day, Japanese attacks were often launched either at dusk or before dawn.

On the evening of 29 June, after employing flamethrowers and poison gas, Japanese combat troops implemented a novel "shock and awe" tactic: To the sound of bugles, conchs, bull horns, porcelain pipes, gongs, drums, and shouts of "Kill! Kill!", herds of bulls and horses with daggers bound to their heads were set on fire and stampeded toward the Chinese lines. The 2nd battalion of the 30th Regiment was overwhelmed and routed for a while, but commanders quickly calmed down, deployed reserve troops, and organized countercharges. Hand-to-hand combat ensued.

By the morning of 30 June, the battalion was decimated and was relieved at noon by the 3rd battalion of the 28th Regiment. Late that afternoon, a southernly wind prevailing, the Japanese seized the chance to utilize poison gas together with relentless bombing and shelling. All 80 men of the 7th company waiting out the bombardment in trenches were poisoned to death. The New York Times on July 7, 1944 reported Japanese use of gas.

More savage onslaughts followed at Mt. Zhangjia (Chinese: 张家山), which consisted of three hills – 227.7 on southeast, 221 on northwest, and Zhangjia northeast – forming a triangle. Japan did capture the three hills several times, but each time the Chinese 10th Reserve Division managed to take it back. First, the 29th Regiment drove back Japanese troops three times, though half its forces died or were wounded. Division headquarters sent the 2nd Battalion of the 30th Regiment under Lieutenant Colonel Shengxian Xu (Chinese: 徐声先)to reinforce them. After the 29th Regiment was relieved, Lieutenant Colonel Xu's battalion had to tackle Japanese breakthroughs twice more and lost 70% of its combat forces. The 1st Battalion was subsequently sent in.

On the afternoon of 30 June, Colonel Kurose Heiichi (黑濑平一)of the 133rd Regiment of the Japanese 68th Division ordered preparations to start after sunset for a powerful attack the next morning. The artillery must start shelling at 5AM, then infantry troops to charge at six. The Colonel's deployment plan was detailed and perfect with a reminder that every battalion must bring bamboo ladders for climbing cliffs.

That night, with the help of darkness, some Japanese troops made it to the top of 227.7 and 221. It was overcast, and by the time the Chinese discovered the situation, hand-to-hand combat was the only option. Everyone kept quiet in order not to reveal his position. The Chinese figured out they could tell friend from foe by feeling the texture of the uniform: coarse cotton, a comrade; smooth khaki, enemy. Thus, in the deadly silence, a most ferocious game of hide-and-seek was played. Only the clash of bayonets and dreadful screams of those stabbed interrupted the feigned tranquility. The scene dumbfounded the reinforcements from both sides, who did not dare to enter until the first light of dawn.

The two heights were taken and retaken over the next two days. On 2 July, after Japan charged to the top, the commander of the 1st Battalion found most of his men unable to fight any more. When a regimental adjutant came to try to boost morale, the two Majors, ready to die, exchanged their names and home addresses. It was in the end General Ge, commander of the 10th Reserve Division, who rushed to the Chinese positions to regroup and repel the Japanese.

1:00 am 3 July, Lieutenant General Yokoyama of the 11th Imperial Army halted the first offensive. The reasons listed in his report were: a. topography (numerous ponds everywhere) and strong positions (fierce flanking fire and stubborn enemy resistance) b. short of munitions c. enemy air force at an advantage.

The Chinese claimed that the overall casualty figures for the five days favored the Chinese side: 16,000 for Japanese 11th Army vs. 4,000 for the Chinese 10th Army. Hengyang defenders had lost two forward positions, Mt. Gao and Mt. Tingbing in the south, and four frontline positions in the north and west. The Japanese claimed that in the first phase of the battle from June 21 until July 4, there were 10,260 abandoned enemy corpses and 1,375 enemy prisoners while their own losses were at 834 killed and 2,488 wounded (including 265 killed and 318 wounded from enemy aircraft).

=== Second Japanese offensive 11–16 July ===
While replenishing its forces and supplies during the week of 3 – 10 July, Japan changed from an overall offensive to nightly attacks at key Chinese positions, mainly in the hilly south and southwest. In addition to deploying the 34th and 117th divisions to Hengyang, the headquarters of the 11th Army sent extra artillery: ten mortars, five mountain guns, eight 100mm cannons, three 150mm howitzers.

For the Chinese 10th Army, the only thing General Fang could do was to recall the 8th Regiment of the 3rd Division that had been deployed outside the city to deter advancing Japanese troops. On 8 July, the Chinese Composite Wing of the 14th Air Force airdropped articles of consolation and appreciation such as towels, soap, and tiger balm. What inspired the 10th Army most was that day's Ta Kung Pao (Chinese: 大公报), the major newspaper of the day. It carried the story of General Ge, commander of the 10th Reserve Division, being awarded the Order of Blue Sky and White Sun.

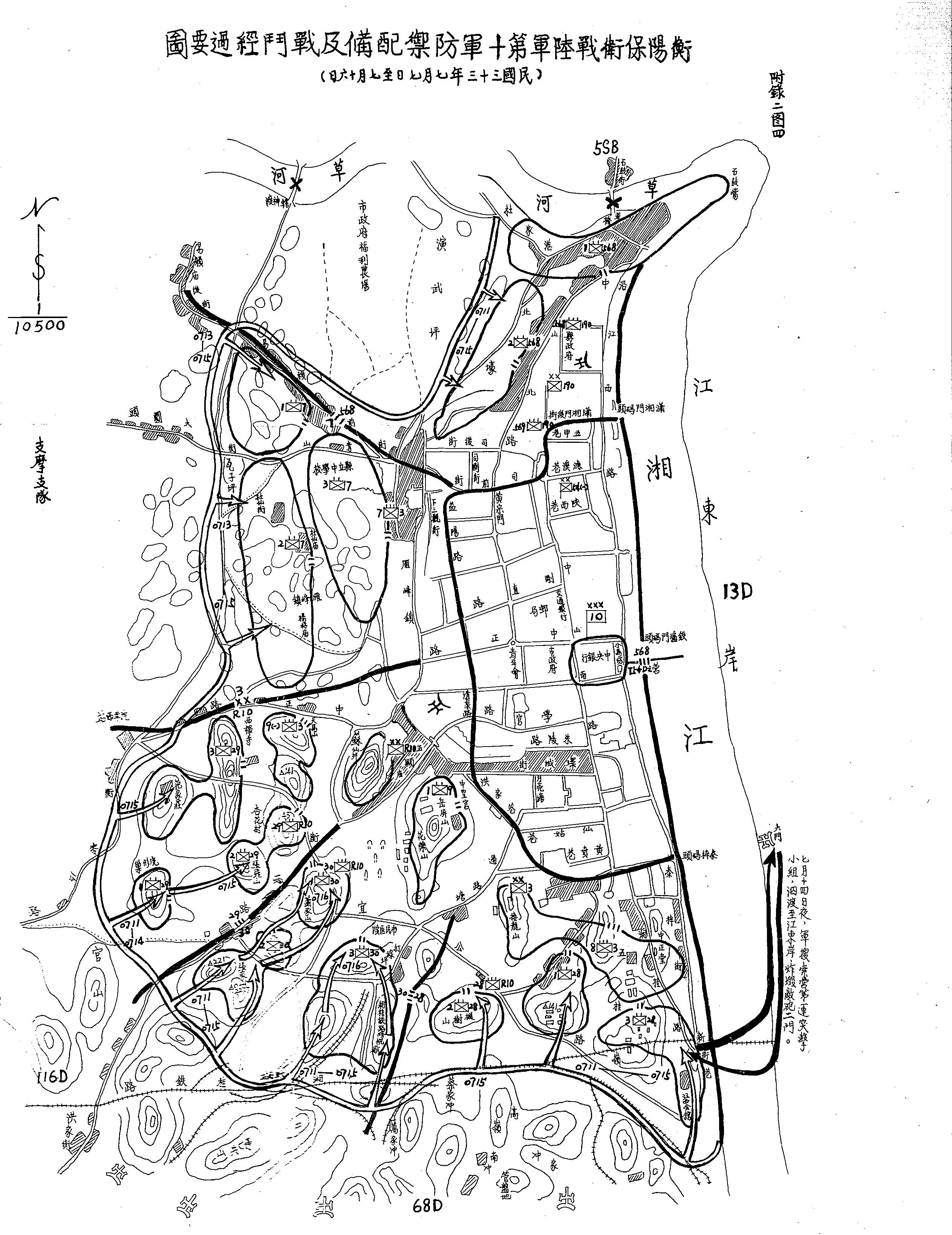
Battle of Hengyang July 7–16, 1944

On 8 July, the Japanese 11th Army headquarters ordered its 116th Division to take all the frontline positions in southwest Hengyang on 11 July and from there conquer the city.

At the same time, the 44th Air Squadron from the Japanese Army Air Service was deployed to the Changsha – Hengyang area to assist their ground troops. From Hengyang Airfield, and despite attacks from the American 14th Air Force, it continuously bombed artillery positions and defense works of the Chinese 10th Army in the southeast, southwest, and west of the city.

Early in the morning on 11 July, Japan started its second offensive. That same day, Lieutenant General Tsutsumi Mikio(Chinese: 堤三树男), newly appointed Commander of the 68th Division, assumed his command. Entrusted to oversee the whole offensive was Commander O Iwanaga of the 116th Division, with a total force of 15 infantry battalions and 12 artillery battalions, plus the 5th Air Group.

The positions at the eastern end in the southern hills, Jiangxi Hall, Wugui Hill, 141 Heights, and Mt. Fengshu, were now defended by the 28th Regiment of the 10th Reserve Division. A whole platoon from 9th Company died after a fierce all-night struggle on 11 July at Jiangxi Hall. At other positions, battles raged on ceaselessly with each side driving the other back several times. Casualties for both Japanese and Chinese mounted rapidly. At Waixin Street (Chinese: 外新街), early on 15 July, over a hundred Japanese troops broke through, and the Chinese 8th Company fought back house by house. Around noon, all but two soldiers and one squad leader of the 8th Company died. Xiaoxia Zang (Chinese: 藏肖侠), company commander from the 10th Army Reconnaissance Battalion, was sent with a special assault group to the rear of the Japanese line to set fire to their command post that night. Synchronizing with him, the reinforcements launched a counterattack from the front. By the next morning, all the Japanese, including their battalion commander and other field officers, had died. The story at 141 Heights and Mt. Fengshu was the same: Japanese forces, a hundred at a time, charged repeatedly, and again and again the 28th Regiment lost and regained their positions. Hundreds of troops died on each side, with 28th Regiment losing one battalion and three company commanders.

The major targets for the Japanese were however Mt. Zhangjia and Huxingchao Heights (Chinese: 虎形巢) in the southwest, regarded to be the two gates into the city, a must for Japan to conquer.

Assaulting Huxingchao was the 120th Regiment of the 116th Division and defending it the 2nd Battalion of the 29th Regiment from the 10th Reserve Division. The big open field in front of the cliff defense works posed extreme difficulties for the 120th Regiment to get across. After failing the first two days, they pushed their heavy artillery forward, and the infantry feigned an attack to expose the six Chinese machine-gun positions, which were then destroyed. With barrages of heavy weapons at close distance, the Japanese finally overcame all the barriers and cliffs and were able to storm up the hill. Colonel Wanimoto Taka (和尔基隆 わに もとたか), the regimental commander, took the lead. Halfway up, Chinese soldiers suddenly jumped out of hidden foxholes and threw hand grenades at the Japanese. Wanimoto Taka was mortally wounded and later posthumously promoted to major general according to Japanese military practice.

Zero Hour, 14 July, the 120th Regiment, commanded by a new colonel, charged again. Three quarters of the 2nd Chinese Battalion having died or been wounded, Battalion Commander Zhenwu Li (Chinese: 李振武) and a few dozen soldiers were cornered on the top of the hill. They each tied hand grenades to their bodies and blew themselves up together with the Japanese swarming around them. The 1st Battalion then moved up to continue the fight until the next day.

More savage was the combat at Mt. Zhangjia, the 133rd Regiment of the Japanese 116th Division attacking the Chinese 30th Regiment of the 10th Reserve Division. Colonel Kurose Heiichi (黑濑平一)had the regimental banner unfurled and declared: "So long as one of us lives, this banner must be planted on Mt. Zhangjia!"

For three days and nights from 11 to 13 July, waves of Japanese troops, a hundred at a time, continuously assaulted 227.7 and 221 heights under cover of air and artillery bombardment. The battles seesawed on a field covered with corpses, both sides engaged in the cruelest stabbing, slashing, and bayoneting. After the position was lost to the Japanese on the first night, two leftover depleted companies of the 2nd Battalion waged a counterattack. At noon on 12 July, with that battalion almost wiped out, Japanese seized the position again. The division Antigas Company joined with regimental troops and took it back, only to lose it again after the whole company with its commander died. The third counterstrike was by two engineering companies from the headquarters of the 10th Army. On the morning of 13 July, the surviving Chinese piled up dead bodies and covered them with dirt, turning those heaps into parapets. In the early afternoon, the Japanese 133rd Regiment assailed the battered heights even more ferociously than before. The two Chinese engineering companies fought to the last man, and towards dusk both 227.7 and 221 were conquered by the Japanese. Immediately Colonel Kurose Heiichi turned to the third hill named after the site itself, Mt. Zhangjia, and General Fang also deployed the 1st Battalion of the 8th Regiment from the 3rd Division there. Brutal combat continued all night through, the small hill taken and retaken three times. Surviving veterans recalled the scene on the morning of 14 July affirming that the corpses of both Chinese and Japanese soldiers were piled high.

By then, the Chinese 10th Reserve Division existed in name only, having sustained immense losses for a month. A large fraction of both logistics and combat soldiers had died. Seeing the division no longer able to continue, General Fang had to order General Ge to fall back to the second line of defense. On the night of 16 July, the 10th Reserve Division, with many men deployed from other divisions, withdrew from the southern end of Wugui Hill, 141 Heights, Mt. Fengshu, Mt. Zhangjia, Huxingchao Heights and all other first line defensive positions in the southwest.

The Japanese were just as frustrated by their lack of significant progress at the cost of heavy casualties, including the deaths of many senior officers. Their military history recorded "the prospect of the battle did not appear to be any more optimistic, and therefore, the offensive stopped again".

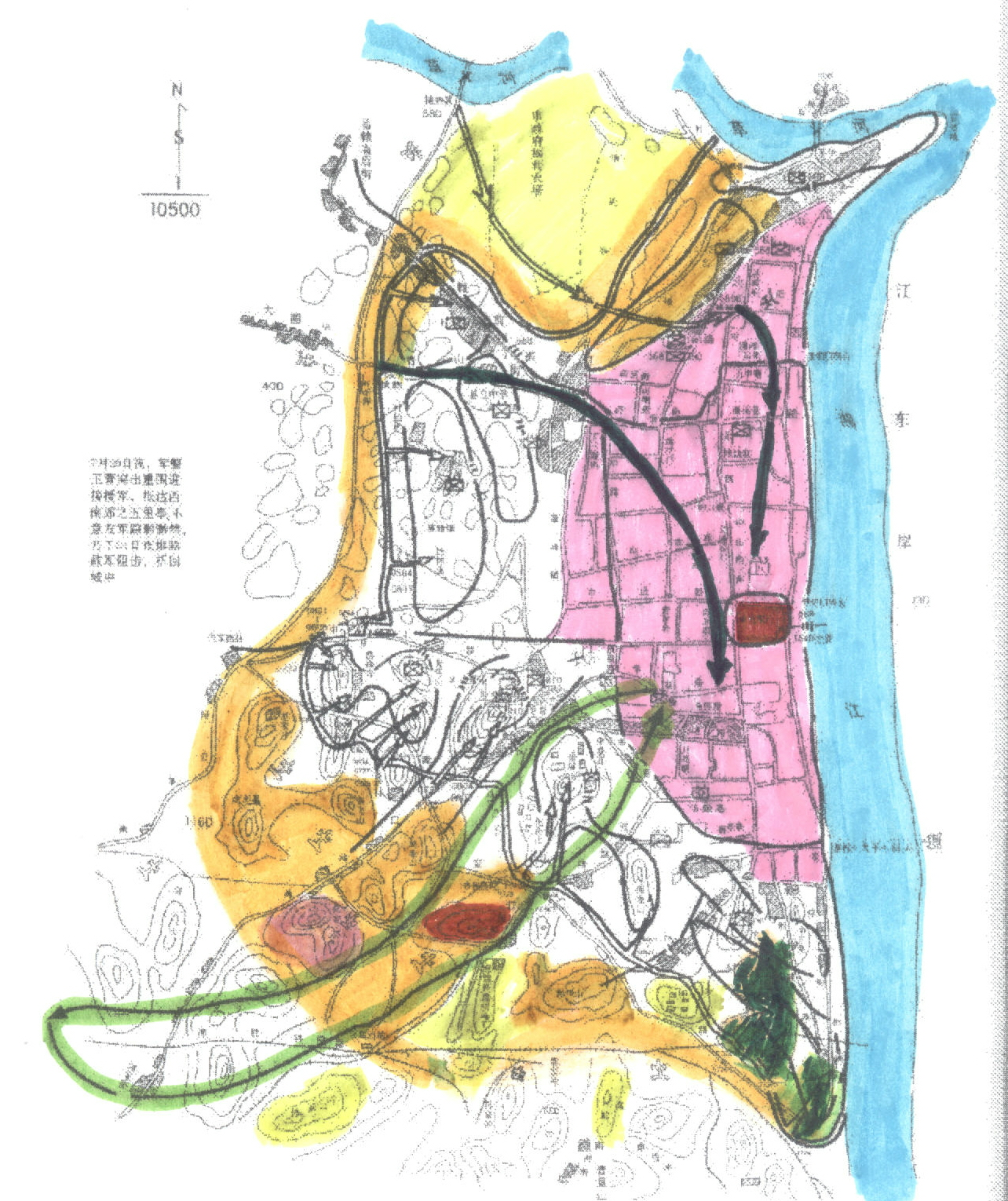
Battle of Hengyang July 17 - August 8, 1944; note at left reads "On the night of 20 July, the 10th Army Security Battalion broke through Japanese siege to meet the Chinese reinforcements at Five-Li Pavilion [1 li ≈ 0.3 miles] in the southwest outskirts of Hengyang, only to see not a single soul there. The battalion fought their way back into the city the following night."

Very early on the morning of 17 July, ferocious battles unfolded on Nameless Heights behind Municipal Hospital (Chinese: 市民医院后无名高地) defended by the 2nd Battalion of the 30th Regiment. Incessant bombardment was followed by infantry charges and then hand-to-hand combat. At 8:00 am, Battalion Commander Shengxian Xu (Chinese: 徐声先) was struck in the head by an artillery shell and died minutes later. Major Wei Xiao (Chinese: 萧维) took over, and was himself seriously wounded at noon. Major Wo Gan (Chinese: 甘握) stepped in as the third battalion commander of the day. At 2:00 pm, Gan's right hand was wounded, and at 5:30 pm, he was hit again in the thigh, the bullet remaining there until after the battle.

The headquarters of the Japanese China Expeditionary Army, dissatisfied with progress in Hengyang, sent their operations director to Changsha on the same day, formally requesting Lieutenant General Yokoyama to mass his forces around Hengyang right away. Facing the reality of 8,000 Japanese casualties in exchange for only small advances in the south and southwest of the city, Yokoyama knew he must comply. At 5:00 pm on 20 July, he suspended the 2nd offensive and actively prepared for a more powerful 3rd offensive. Fang Xianjue's telegram on 24 July 1944 painted a bleak picture regarding his corps' situation by the end of the second offensive. He reported that out of the 16,275 officers and soldiers who participated in the defense of Hengyang, there were 22 school officers and 594 junior officers who were killed or wounded, 7,898 soldiers who were killed in action or died of their wounds, and 5,564 soldiers who were wounded by July 19. The whole corps had only more than 2,000 combat troops left.

Japan however did not completely cease their nightly assaults. From 21 July to 3 August, they attacked all the Chinese positions in the west, southwest, and south, and even attempted crossing the Xiang River to take Hengyang from east. Both sides incurred heavy casualties as a result. On the Japanese side, in just the crossing of the Xiang River on 21 July, over 5,000 troops were shot and drowned. On the morning of 28 July, at a small height between Wuxian Temple (Chinese: 五显庙) and Suxian Well (Chinese: 苏仙井), over 600 Japanese soldiers became entangled in barbwire laid in a deep V-shaped moat and became easy targets for machineguns. According to the memoir by Company Commander Yoshiharu Izaki, in taking a small mound south of the city hospital the 133rd Regiment of the 116th Division paid the price of 2,750 lives, leaving only 250 survivors. As for the Chinese, the situation was even more dire. By the end of July, only 3,000 combat troops had remained, with fewer than 500 from the 10th Reserve Division, fewer than 2,000 from the 3rd Division, 400 from the 190th Division, and few remaining from the one battalion of the 54th Division, plus around 100 artillery troops. Due to its dire situation, the Ninth Military Front was not able to fully account for the losses of the Tenth Corps, recording its casualties from the start of the battle until July 30 at 1,465 killed and 3,289 wounded and Japanese casualties in the same period at 2,781 killed and 5,670 wounded.

Despite airdrops from the 14th Airforce, food, medicine, and munitions dwindled day by day in the besieged city. Rice buried underground before the war was mostly burnt by the Japanese use of napalm, so the burnt rice cooked in salt was the only food available. Cats, rats, fish, and shrimp had long been completely devoured, and an occasional old saddle was regarded as a delicious treat.

Field hospitals and clinics were filled with wounded soldiers. Nurses only had salt water to clean wounds. When gauze and bandages ran out, they boiled cotton quilts and tore up sheets and blankets for dressing. Gradually, lightly wounded soldiers did not bother to seek medical treatment, and some of the severely wounded either committed suicide or remained in battle to blow themselves up together with as many enemy soldiers as possible. A surviving doctor from the battle Hongchuan Zhou (Chinese: 周宏遄) recalled a scene he would never forget: His fellow doctor Captain Xingsan Jia (Chinese: 贾省三) was hit in the abdomen, the intestines oozing out from a gaping wound. On their way to the field hospital, Captain Jia asked to be taken to the Xiang River for a drink of water. With his own eyes, Zhou witnessed Jia deliberately falling into the river to drown.

Company Commander Xiaoxia Zang's story testifies to a severe shortage of ammunition on the Chinese side: "At dusk 28 July, dozens of enemy soldiers appeared in the gully about a hundred meters away from our position. I requested mortar fire but it stopped after only a few rounds. Later, I found out they had long run out of 81mm bombs. We now only have 82mm ones, and the non-combatant staff from headquarters have been using bricks and rocks to grind them down by 1mm. They've been working hard, their hands blistered and bleeding, but could never keep up with the demand. They've tried everything they could think of but failed. This is really crazy, never heard of such a thing."

The Japanese also experienced ammunition shortages. The moment the Changsha-Hengshan Motor Road was opened to traffic on 25 July, Japan had thirty-six tons of munitions trucked to Hengshan, then carried to the Hengyang frontlines using horses.

=== Third Japanese offensive 4–8 August ===
By 1 August, five Japanese divisions totaling 110,000 troops, five heavy artillery, and fifty mountain artillery, with 40,000 shells, had assembled outside Hengyang. Lieutenant General Yokoyama, wearing a hierogram of the grand shrine for the celestial sun goddess, flew to Hengyang, ready to command the third offensive himself the next day. On 3 August, he instructed: "Preparations for capturing Hengyang with 116th, 68th, 58th, and 13th Divisions have been done. There will never be a better opportunity to take the city if we miss this moment. This army is expecting certain success, eagerly looking to conquer Hengyang with one strike."

Zero hour on 3 August, three squadrons, 6th, 16th, and 44th, of the Japanese Army Air Service started bombing the city, including the location of the 10th Army headquarters inside the city and battle positions in the suburbs. The artillery troops joined the air bombardment at noon, carpet-bombing everything, with some mountain artillery pieces pushed to within a hundred meters from Chinese positions to fire directly at the front line.

The next day, 4 August, Japan launched a formal, all-round assault, with 40th Division in the northwest, 58th north, 116th west, 68th assisted by the 13th to the south, and the 3rd Division ready to partake any moment. All the Chinese troops put up a resistance as tough as ever. At North Wugui Hill, soldiers of the 2nd Battalion of the 8th Regiment from the 3rd Division kept fighting from trenches filled with waist-deep water, and their battalion commander died. They took back their position in the end. Short of shells and bullets, the Chinese mainly relied on hand grenades bound together to increase the power of killing. The 6th Company of the 9th Regiment at the 141 Heights between Mt. Tianma (Chinese: 天马山) and Xichan Temple (Chinese: 西禅寺) kept their stronghold for the whole day using the bound hand grenades, an invention by the 10th Army.

On 5 August, ferocious attacks and counterattacks continued. Commander of the Japanese 133rd Regiment of the 116th Division, Kurose Heiichi (黑濑平一), just promoted to major general four days before, decided to lead in person the handful of two hundred men left in his regiment on a suicidal charge that night. The division commander prevented him, commenting that the plan would only result in more Japanese casualties. The commander of the 120th Regiment of the 116th Division that were attempting to occupy Mt. Tianma and Xichan Temple watched with horror as his soldiers climbing up the cliffs were hit by hand grenades and fell to their deaths one after another: "The battle at Xichan was a savage and heroic scene rarely seen in modern-day fighting." By the end of the day, the Chinese reconnaissance company of the 3rd Division defending Xichan had only a dozen men surviving. The 58th Division had luck grabbing some Chinese outposts in the north, but not without all-night fighting and casualties.

At 3:00 pm that day, Chinese 10th Army Commander General Fang called his four division commanders together for a summit meeting. All agreed that they could at most hold on for three more days unless reinforcements arrived. Commander of the 3rd Division, Qingxiang Zhou (Chinese: 周庆祥), suggested that they should try to break through. One senior staff member objected. He reminded the others of a Division Commander, Chengwan Yu (Chinese: 余程万), who broke through at the end of the Battle of Changde (Chinese: 常德会战) leaving wounded soldiers behind and was scolded by Chiang Kai-shek and court marshalled. All cried, realizing that it would be wrong to leave more than 6,000 wounded comrades-in-arms behind. The only choice was to soldier on and die with the city.

3:00 am on 6 August. Japanese 58th Division took Yanwuping (Chinese: 演武坪) in the north, killing all three dozen Chinese combat soldiers left of the 5th Company of the 568th Regiment from the 190th Division. Noon at North Wugui Hill, the Mortar Company commander of the 8th Regiment from the 3rd Division saw a Japanese commander waving his sword ordering his troops to charge. The Chinese company commander determined to fire his last eight rounds to eliminate what his gut told him must be a high-ranking officer. In this way Japan lost the commander of the 57th Brigade, Major General Shima Genkichi (志摩源吉). A little after 3:00 pm, Japanese 68th Division broke through North of Wugui Hill and Mt Yueping (Chinese: 岳屏山), and after dark both Xichan Temple in the west and Waixin Street in the southeast were lost to Japanese attackers.

Noon that day. Chinese division commanders gathered at the 10th Army headquarters expressing their dismal view of the battle that they had been fighting for 45 days. They were now facing an army a hundred times as strong as theirs. Hengyang would fall at any time. General Fang ordered Chief of Staff Mingyu Sun (Chinese: 孙鸣玉) to draft a telegram to Chiang Kai-shek, now renowned as "the last telegram": "Enemy broke through North Gate this morning and started street fighting. We are practically wiped out and have no more soldiers to stop them now. We are swearing to perform a soldier's duty and die for the country so as to live up to your expectations. This can be our last telegram. See you in the next life." The signatories were General Fang, Chief of Staff Sun, and the four division commanders. The telegram was delivered to Chongqing via two channels: Zhijiang Airport and the south of Yangtse radiotelegraph network.

That afternoon, the 10th Army learned from a Japanese captive speaking some Chinese that Japanese were anxious to end the battle because almost 30% of their troops were suspected to have cholera. That evening, Chief of Staff Sun ordered that the saline drips be stopped for the two Japanese prisoners dying of cholera. Forty-one other prisoners going on hunger strike were shot and sank to the bottom of the Xiang River. Shortly before, thirty-two seriously wounded Chinese soldiers infected with cholera were euthanized. Another 1,000 wounded, suffering from diarrhea, were quarantined in an isolated area at Big West Gate (Chinese: 大西门) and later died in a bombing raid on 8 August.

General Fang, Chief of Staff Sun, and Qingxiang Zhou had a long discussion late into the night. Seeing the thousands of wounded men waiting to die simply because of no medicine available and a rapid spread of cholera, they realized that it was time to arrange a ceasefire.

Dawn 7 August. Three Japanese 100 mm cannons and 150 mm howitzers kept firing at Mt Yueping, Suxian Well, and remaining buildings in the city proper for two hours. Three squadrons from the air service also went all out as Yokoyama watched the battle himself at a south observation post. Soon the 68th Division pushed through to Qingshan Avenue (Chinese: 青山街) in the northwest where all the Chinese soldiers with their battalion and regiment commanders from the 7th Regiment of the 3rd Division died. At that stage, the surviving Chinese combat troops were no longer enough to guard every stronghold yet unoccupied by Japan, allowing Japanese troops to rush through the western outskirts of the city all the way to Yanglin Temple (Chinese: 杨林庙). There, they broke into the 69th Field Hospital and killed over 1,000 severely wounded Chinese.

That afternoon, half a dozen soldiers with dozens of the wounded received permission to retreat from Mt. Tianma. To prevent Japanese troops from pursuing them, Chief of Staff Sun advised that the last group to withdraw should put up a white flag to fool the enemy. By the time Japan realized the trick, the Chinese had all left the position.

That day, according to a Japanese history book, a captive Chinese officer released by the 120 Regiment of the 116th Division the previous night contacted the regiment commander, hinting at the Chinese willingness to surrender. Memoirs by the surviving Chinese veterans claim that General Fang sent a senior staff member who spoke Japanese, Guangkuan Zhang (Chinese: 张广宽), to negotiate a ceasefire as well as raise a protest against Japanese killing of wounded soldiers.

11:00 pm. Chief of Staff Sun accompanied by G. Zhang and a few other senior officers arrived at the 68th Division command post, where Lieutenant General Tsutsumi Mikio (堤三树男) agreed to have a formal negotiation for ceasefire at nine o'clock the next morning.

3:00 am 8 August. All three Japanese divisions pushed in: 68th northward to North of Yueping, 116th northeastward to North of Xichan Temple and Mt. Tianma, and 58th southward to downtown Hengyang, where the 10th Army had their headquarters in the basement of the Central Bank. All the telephone lines were cut. Hearing the Japanese gunshots getting closer, General Fang took out his pistol, ready to kill himself. The Baggage Regiment Commander and his aide-de-camp, who had been watching Fang, knocked the pistol from his hand just as the shot was fired.

5:00 am. Japanese broke into the 10th Army headquarters. General Fang, four division commanders, a few of their bodyguards, and remaining staff members were all captured, and later escorted to the Catholic church in the south of the city.

10:30 am. Lieutenant General Tsutsumi Mikio (堤三树男) arrived at the church for an official meeting. The Japanese record adopts the wording "measures of ceasefire are adopted after a formal confirmation of surrender" for that occasion. The Chinese survivors however always insisted that they never agreed to "surrender", but only to stop fighting.

Sporadic fighting continued throughout the day. Some Chinese soldiers were so isolated that the notice of ceasefire never reached them, others just did not want to put down their weapons. Finally, at sunset, the shooting died down.

== Relief efforts ==
Before the Battle of Hengyang began, Chiang Kai-shek promised help to General Fang of the 10th Army from both the air force and army. Chiang had a bold vision of his other armies surrounding the besieging Japanese troops, and they would be finally annihilated by his forces from inside and outside the city.

On 12 July, a day after the Japanese second offensive started in Hengyang, Chiang Kai-shek ordered two armies to rapidly relieve Hengyang. The 62nd Army should attack the rear of the enemy from the southwest of Hengyang, while the 79th should push vigorously towards the northwest to assist the 62nd.

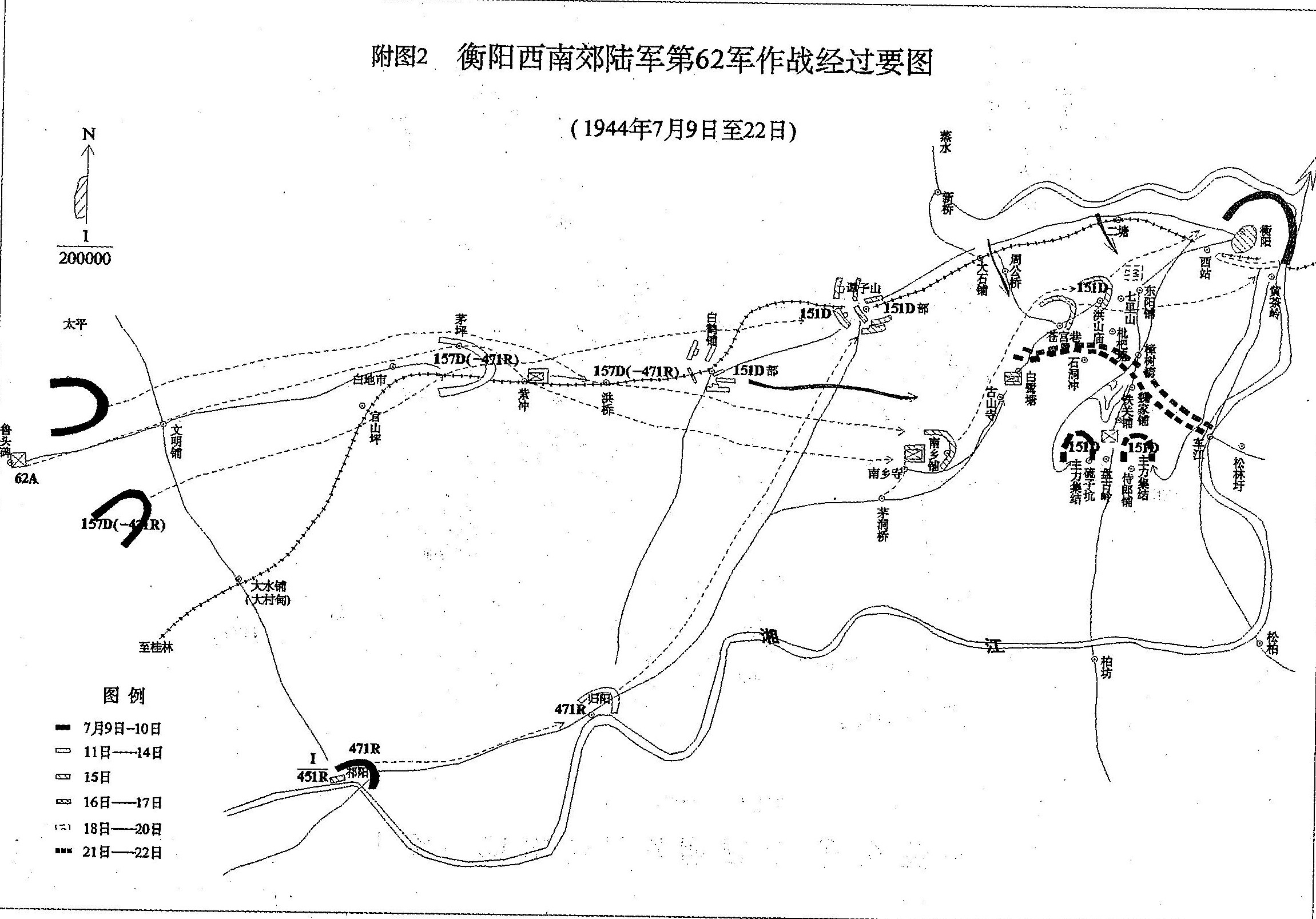
Battle of Hengyang 62nd Army relief effort July 9–22, 1944. The map covers an area of about 50 miles by 25 miles, with the city of Hengyang at the upper right. The legend indicates it is showing the units of the 62nd Army advancing from the southwest for dates from the 9 - 10 of July through the 21 - 22 of July.

The next day, the 151st Division of the 62nd took Baihepu (Chinese: 白鹤铺), about 20 miles from Hengyang. On 14 July, the 194th Division of the 79th Army fought their way to Xinqiao (Chinese: 新桥), ten miles from Hengyang. On 16 July, the 10th Army sent another urgent request for reinforcements, and the Military Council ordered the 62nd Army to press more forcefully and swiftly to Hengyang without getting hung up battling Japanese troops on the way. After occupying Mt. Yumu (Chinese: 雨母山), a position six miles from Hengyang on 17 July, the 151st Division immediately continued fighting their way to Oujiading (Chinese: 欧家町) and Huangcha Hill (Chinese: 黄茶岭), two to three miles from Hengyang. In the meantime, the 79th Army formed six commando units to find their way to relieve the besieged 10th Army. On 20 July, both the 151st and 157th divisions of the 62nd Army arrived at Oujiading and Huangcha Hill.

That same day, Lieutenant General Yokoyama of the 11th Imperial Army suspended the second offensive on Hengyang, thus releasing more of his men to turn to fight the Chinese reinforcements. The two divisions of the 62nd Army met with intensive gunfire from Japanese forces when trying to advance to Hengyang West Train Station. Encouraged by the sight of the city of Hengyang right in front of them, soldiers of the 151st and 157th divisions threw themselves all into fierce combat. By early night, their main force managed to conquer Mt. Tingbing (Chinese: 停兵山) and the train station. Hearing gunshots in the southwest, the headquarters of the besieged 10th Army inside Hengyang believed that reinforcements must be approaching. Through radio communication with the 62nd Army, they soon agreed to send a small force to lead the 151st and 157th divisions into Hengyang. That night, the 10th Army Security Battalion broke through the Japanese siege to try to meet the 62nd Army at Five-Li Pavilion (Chinese: 五里亭) in the southwest outskirts, only to see not a single soul there.

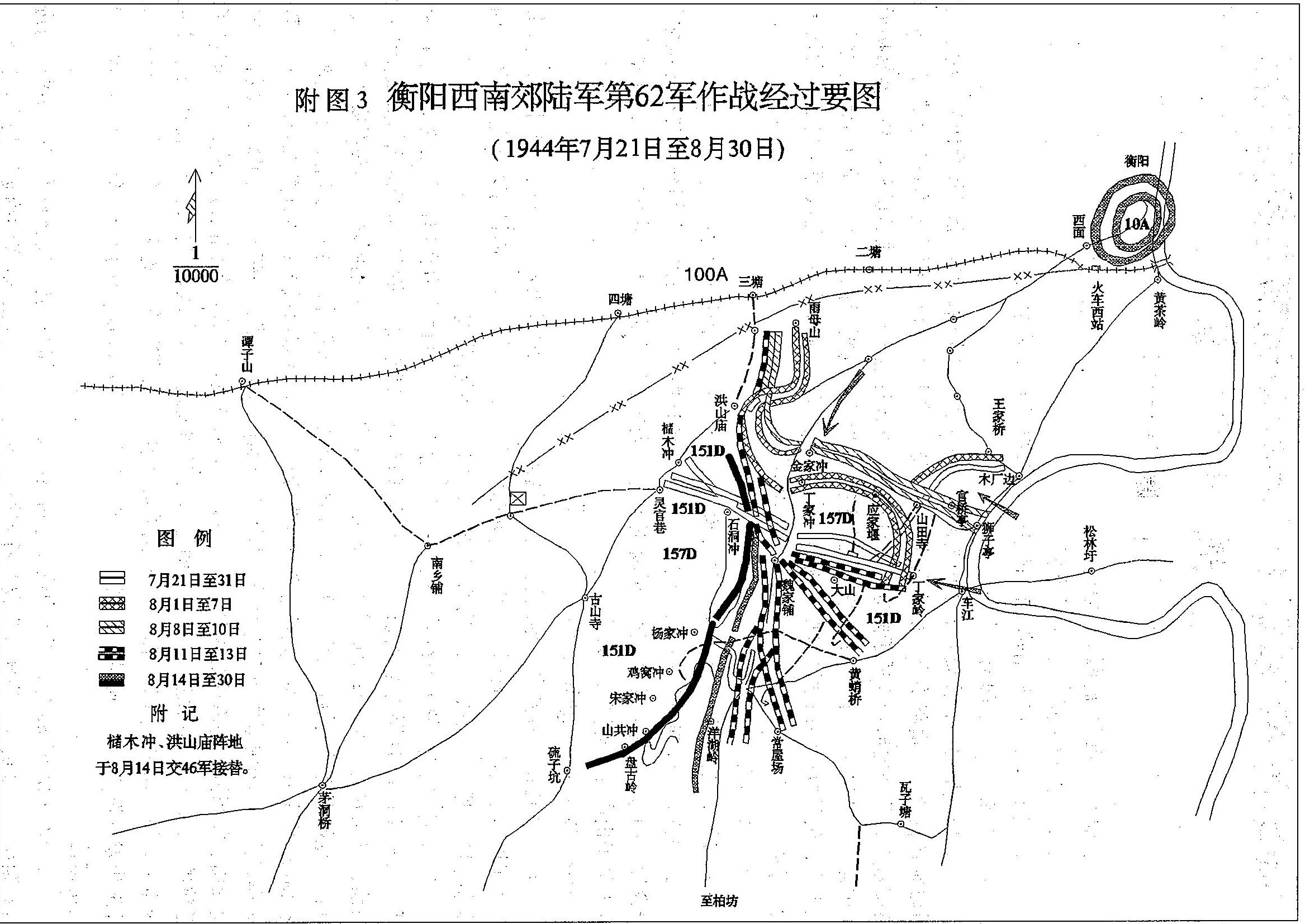
Battle of Hengyang 62nd Army relief effort July 21 - August 30, 1944. The map covers an area of about 30 miles by 15 miles, again with the city at the upper right. It shows the 62nd Army positions for dates from the 21 - 31 of July through the 14 - 30 of August.

On 21 July, the Japanese launched vehement assaults on the 62nd Army, inflicting heavy losses including the death of the commander of the 471st regiment of the 157th Division. The 62nd Army retreated back to Mt. Yumu. The 79th Army, further from Hengyang, also sustained counterattacks from the Japanese and stopped advancing. Two days later, the National Military Council ordered, in a much sterner tone, the two armies to relieve Hengyang without delay, making it clear that "relieving Hengyang is the ONLY task" for them. A few days later, the Council deployed three more armies, the 74th, 46th, and 100th (incomplete) to join the relief efforts.

From 23 July, Japan managed to break some Chinese radio codes and obtained quite a few important orders and maneuvering instructions from the National Military Council and army headquarters. In the following weeks leading up to 8 August when Hengyang fell, the Chinese reinforcements frequently met with large Japanese forces blocking their way. Many positions just outside Hengyang were taken and retaken, with mounting casualties on both sides. As a result, the Chinese reinforcements never really reached Hengyang. When the headquarters of the 10th Army fell into Japanese hands on early morning of 8 August, most of the reinforcements were lingering around ten miles away from the besieged city, with only a small force from the 79th Army attempting to take Mt. Gao, a forward position about two miles from the desperate 10th Army.

In the three-week relief attempt, the 62nd corps had suffered the most losses with 5,095 casualties including deputy divisional commander Yu Ziwu (余子武) killed. The 73rd, 74th, 79th, and 100th corps of the 24th army group suffered 17,622 casualties in the whole battle of Changsha-Hengyang. The 46th corps suffered 369 killed and 619 wounded.

A review of the Changsha-Hengyang Campaign by the Chinese National Defense admitted: "Our military applied our forces one by one, failing to bring the maximum power into play. While our enemy rapidly gathered their superior forces, we entered the battlefields slowly one after another. For example, the main force of the 74th Army from the 24th Army Group stayed in Changde for a long time, whereas the 46th Army from Guangxi arrived at the site at the end of the battle. In addition, just at the most pivotal moment, the 46th Army withdrew all their troops, providing chances for the enemy to defeat us one by one."

The Japanese military history gave a commentary that even the Chinese surviving veterans of the Battle of Hengyang thought fair: "In reality, our enemy's reinforcements (three divisions) were reaching the vicinity of Hengyang at the time. Then, our 40th Division counterpunched, and soon the Chinese gave up Hengyang, turned round, and retreated to the south."

Renowned war correspondent Theodore H. White himself witnessed the passivity of the Chinese reinforcements. One hot July afternoon, he and Graham Barrow of Reuters arrived at the headquarters of the 151st Division of the 62nd Army. They learned that the division "was certain that by next day the division would break through the Japs and the road to relieve Hengyang would be open". They heard guns and shells the second night, but the division's attack didn't seem to have materialized. On the third night, the division stopped attacking and was instead getting ready to shift into the hills. The fourth day, White and Barrow left in disappointment.

== Aftermath ==
After the battle, Hengyang was in a state of utter destruction, with most buildings levelled to the ground. The Catholic church near Huangcha Hill run by Italians had a painting of the Italian National Flag on its roof, and therefore escaped from being bombed. General Fang, Chief of Staff Sun, the four division commanders, and officers of the headquarters were imprisoned in that still intact church building. Other surviving soldiers and officers were detained in dozens of half-ruined government offices, schools, temples, bomb shelters, and even fortresses.

On the afternoon of 8 August, Major Takeuchi (竹内), an envoy sent by the headquarters of the 11th Japanese Imperial Army, visited General Fang at the church. After reaffirming that the 10th Army did not surrender without conditions, Fang made three requests: guarantee the safety of all surviving soldiers and officers and allow them to rest, provide the wounded with medical treatment and bury the dead in Chinese tradition, and not break up the structure of the 10th Army by sending any men away from Hengyang. On behalf of Lieutenant General Yokoyama, Takeuchi expressed a high respect for the 10th Army: "Your bravery was not only admired by the Japanese troops here, but also known to our base and even the emperor back in Japan." He then readily accepted all of Fang's requests.

In reality, there was neither food nor medicine. It happened to be the time of the year for the rice crop to mature in Hengyang, and so all captives, fit or wounded, so long as able to walk, were forced to go to the rice fields in the outskirts of the city to harvest. Only a small amount of what was brought in was allocated to Chinese prisoners, who threshed those few stalks of rice and cooked the grains into some kind of gruel to feed themselves. As for the seriously wounded, only officers above the rank of captain had the chance to see the doctor, and even then the treatment provided was rudimentary. Many soldiers and low-ranking officers were brutalized and killed by the Japanese or left to die from hunger or suicide.

Shortly, Japan wanted to have the 10th Army restructured into an army called "Xianhe" (先和). The first character came from General Fang's name meaning "first" and the second character from Japanese meaning "harmony" or "peace". Knowing that the so called "Xianhe" Army would be a puppet unit under Japanese control, General Fang refused. Japan killed those hospitalized Chinese soldiers as a means to pressure Fang. Chief of Staff Sun however suggested that they should pretend to accept the proposal, play along, wait for the Japanese to relax their vigilance, and then seize the chance to escape.

At the end of September, Xianhe Army was formally set up. Chief of Staff Sun and Commander Zhou of the 3rd Division sprang into action. On the stormy night of 9 October, they climbed out of the windows and escaped. They were followed on a later day by Division Commander Rao. Then on the night of 18 November, General Fang fled. With Japanese guards slacking off during that period, more and more men from the 10th Army escaped, and General Fang's getaway encouraged even more to flee, even those seriously wounded who had been contemplating ending their lives. At the same time, some previous Hengyang residents returned home. The residents' willingness and resourcefulness helped facilitate their beloved heroes breaking free from Japanese captivity. Of those who succeeded, many made their way back to join General Fang in Chongqing, and some others joined local guerrillas to resume their fight with Japanese.

133rd infantry regiment (Arashi Unit 6214) member Koichi Urata admitted that Japanese were slaughtered at the battle of Changde, saying "most of the wounded never returned" and they lost "heavy casualties" and that Japan needed entirely new green conscripts with no combat experience for the attack on Changsha, Hengyang and Guilin during Ichigo to replace the dead from Changde. He also admitted that the Japanese falsely boated they could take Hengyang in 3 days but then their commanding officers were massacred by the Chinese, including their battallion commander, Second Lieutenant Ikezaki and at Hill 33 Captain Hideo Ono. Only 40 men were left out of the entire 9th Company. The Chinese wiped out the entire Japanese 11th Company before the 9th Company attacked Hill 34. A Chinese mortar blew off part of Mitsuo Matsubara's head at the battle of Hill 55 and 56. He admitted the Japanese siege of Hengyang was far behind schedule. He admitted he got amoebic dysentery and wore the same clothes for 40 days. He drank dysentery infected pond water with corpses in it causing bloody diarrhea since he had no othere water supply.

== Recognition ==
When the news of Hengyang's fall was finally confirmed and sent to Chiang Kai-shek, he wrote in his diary: "This sorrow of mine has never been so intense and penetrating." Immediately, he ordered that on 20 August all the military forces of the nation must remain silent for three minutes to pay respect to those from the 10th Army who sacrificed their lives for their country.

All the top five commanders in the 10th Army were awarded the military's highest medal, the Blue Sky and White Sun, which was rare. The medals for two division commanders, Ge and Zhou, had been instantly approved and delivered onto the battlefield by the air force, and the other three for General Fang and division commanders Rao and Rong were bestowed after they escaped from captivity.

During July and early August, when the battle was still raging, major Chinese newspapers of the day had already enthusiastically commended the 10th Army, comparing the Battle of Hengyang to the Battle of Stalingrad. Then from September to December, the surviving fighters fleeing from Japanese captivity set off a new upsurge of praise for their lofty heroism, calling General Fang and his soldiers the "spirit of our resistance". The Dagong Daily pointed out the contributions made by the Battle of Hengyang: It "not only made our enemy pay dearly, but also set an example for all Chinese soldiers".

Mao Zedong published an editorial in the Liberation Daily on August 12, 1944, saying: "The defenders of Hengyang are heroic, and the people of Hengyang have made heavy sacrifices.""

China at War, an English language monthly published by the China Information Committee and distributed by the Chinese News Service, paid tribute in its September 1944 issue: "The 200,000 Chinese soldiers in and around Hengyang must now take their proper place along with the defenders of Changteh and Stalingrad in the history of mankind." and "The Battle of Hengyang is an epic of the war."

In contrast, public opinion in Japan regarded the Battle of Hengyang in China and Imphal Battle in India, as well as the earlier Guadalcanal Battle in the South Pacific, as the three biggest military losses. These constituted a major cause for the downfall of the Tojo Government.

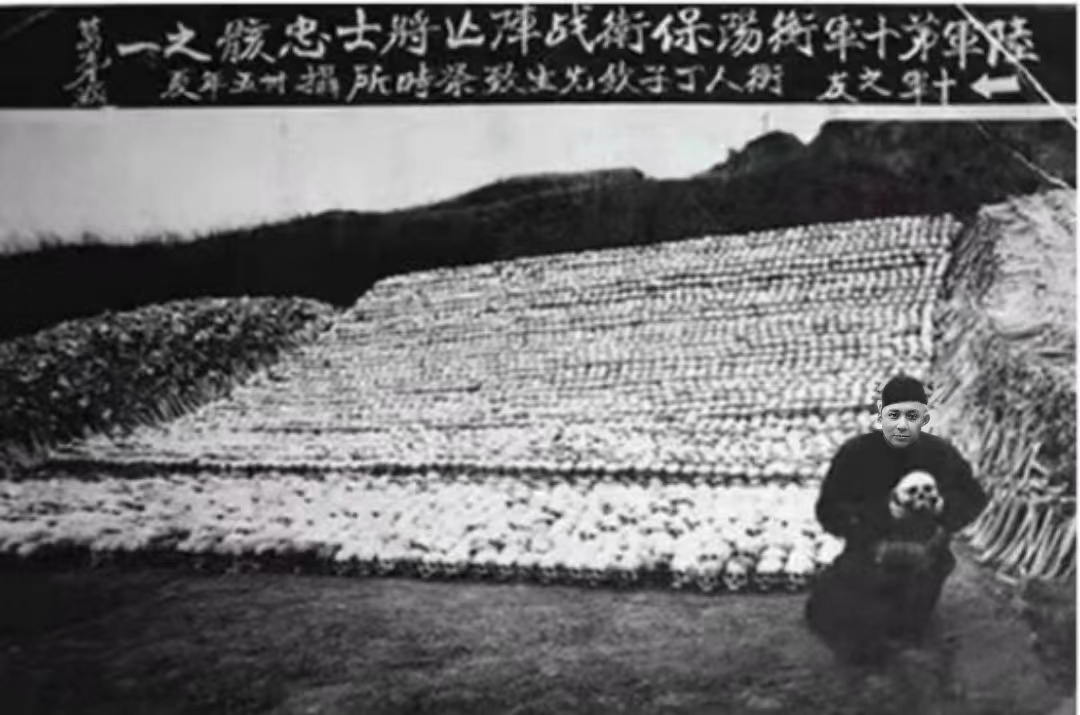
Skulls gathered after the Battle of Hengyang

On 17 February 1946, six months after Japanese surrender, Chiang Kai-shek ordered General Ge, the previous commander of the 10th Reserve Division of the 10th Army, to go back to Hengyang to collect the bones of the dead to create a hero's cemetery there. With the help of over sixty surviving battle soldiers, Ge's team worked doggedly and conscientiously for more than four months, digging out skulls and bones, washing them, sprinkling them with perfume, and neatly laying them on the slope of Mt. Zhangjia, where the battle was the most ferocious and cruelest. General Ge then contracted a photographer to commemorate the occasion. Eight weeks later, an ossuary was built and a white marble stela erected with the words: Tomb of the soldiers of the 10th Army who died in the Battle of Hengyang.

October that year, a delegation led by Xiaolu Yang (Chinese: 杨晓麓), President of the Hengyang Senate, left Hengyang for Nanjing to petition for honoring Hengyang as the first and only "Memorial City in Resistance of Japan", and for appropriating funds to rebuild the city.

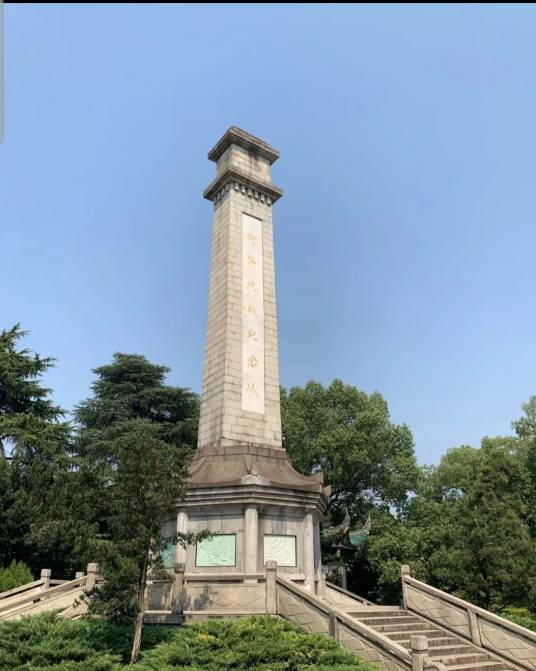
Memorial erected after the Battle of Hengyang

On January 23, 1947, Chiang Kai-shek received the delegation and promised to do his best to grant their wish. On August 10, a ceremony for naming Hengyang "Memorial City in Resistance of Japan" and laying the foundation of a monument was held on the top of Mt Yueping (Chinese: 岳屏), where there had been fierce see-saw fighting in the second and third offensives during the Battle of Hengyang. Chiang Kai-shek's speech, written solely for the occasion, began as follows: "During the eight years of resistance, there were more than a hundred big campaigns and numerous battles. Of all of them, Hengyang Battle stands out singularly. Holding out for so long, sacrificing so much, affecting me so deeply, it simply shocks the world."

== Legacy ==
For thousands of years, Chinese believed in the slogan "rather die than surrender". Early on the morning that Hengyang fell, General Fang took out his pistol to shoot himself, but it was knocked out of his hand by his aide-de-camp, who had been watching him closely. Later, after Fang escaped and reported back to Chongqing, the rumors spread that Fang had surrendered, even though Chiang Kai-shek himself had proclaimed admiration for General Fang and his army.

1949 saw Chiang Kai-shek take the government of the Republic of China to Taiwan, and with the bureaucracy went the whispers about General Fang. The subject of the Battle of Hengyang was thus avoided for decades. As late as 2006, the Museum of the History of the National Military Forces did not even mention the battle by name.

Back in mainland China, on October 1, 1949, the Communist Party founded the People's Republic of China, and began to expunge from the record contributions made by the Nationalists in the resistance of Japan. All the educational and propagandistic organs toed the line that Chiang Kai-shek and his government had a policy of non-resistance. So, the generations born during and after WWII were all taught that only the Communists put up a fight. Some descendants of the Battle of Hengyang heroes would not even trust stories about their fathers sacrificing their lives in the Battle of Hengyang. For one, they never heard of the battle; and two, they believed that all Nationalist officers were cowardly and corrupt and would not willingly die for the cause of resistance.

In 1950, Chiang Kai-shek's words "Hengyang Memorial City in Resistance of Japan" on the monument were chiseled out and replaced by "Hengyang Liberation". Then in 1958, the ossuary and the white marble stela engraved with "Tomb of the soldiers of the 10th Army who died in Hengyang Battle" on Mt. Zhangjia were demolished to make way for a meteorological station. Further construction of dormitories, dining halls, and garages in the following two decades resulted in dead soldiers' bones being dug out, scattered, and shipped to wastelands in distant suburbs.

Outside China, Chiang Kai-shek's troops' "furious resistance in Hengyang" remained little known, perhaps under the influence of "the memoirs of a bitter General Stilwell". According to the diary by Yongchang Xu (Chinese: 徐永昌), head of the Department of Military Operations, in mid-July 1944, "President Roosevelt telegraphed Chiang Kai-shek, remarking that the Nationalist defeats in Henan and Hunan had damaged China's credibility and suggesting the appointment of General Joseph Stilwell to command Allied forces in China, including those of the Chinese Communists." The time coincided with the second Japanese offensive in the Battle of Hengyang, when the 10th Army was fighting tooth and nail and repulsed Japanese charges hundreds of times, but their valor was not perceived. On the contrary, when "Chennault went directly to Stilwell, begging him to send a tiny amount of support, some 1,000 tons, to the Chinese front-line troops, Stilwell vetoed that plea with three words: 'Let them stew.'" Consequently, the Battle of Hengyang never became well known in the English-speaking world.

=== Contemporary status ===
In 1980, the head of the Taiwan Academia Historica noticed the stark difference between Japanese and Chinese archives about the Battle of Hengyang: Japan kept meticulously detailed records about the battle, chronicling its intensity and cruelty and, surprisingly, expressing admiration for the fighting spirit of the Chinese 10th Army and its commander General Fang; the Chinese archives however contained only a few sketchy and obscure notes. He called the battle survivors together to remedy the deficiency. At the end of the meeting, Tianlin Bai, a company commander in the battle, was entrusted to write a book on behalf of the survivors. It took him four years to produce the most crucial and authoritative written record of the Battle of Hengyang.

In 1984, at the fortieth anniversary of the battle, Taiwan's Nationalist Party held another meeting for the surviving veterans to recall the "national sacred battle buried for forty years". Ten old soldiers took the floor, and their remembrances of the battle were recorded and later published in General Fang and the Hengyang Campaign, another book full of first-hand information.

In the meantime, surviving veterans of the Japanese 116th and 68th divisions also wrote memoirs and gathered regularly, reminiscing about the barbaric battle of four decades before. Hearing the news of General Fang's death in 1983, they organized a large delegation to Taiwan to pay respect at the general's tomb. Subsequently, on the first and third anniversary of Fang's death, up to a hundred veterans attended memorial services. In their eulogies, the Japanese Hengyang veterans expressed their admiration for General Fang and his 10th Army: "Merely field positions surrounded with earthen trenches, the Hengyang defense works were far inferior to those solid and substantial fortresses at Ryojun in the Japanese-Russian War. Yet, your honorable army could hold out as long as forty-seven days, making us Japanese troops pay a tremendously heavy price, which was indeed an unprecedented undertaking rarely seen in war history during the last eighty years. ... General Fang, in my opinion, has superior understanding and capabilities in making use of topography, deploying troops and weaponry, gunnery training, and war commanding. ... the 10th Army is the staunchest, and General Fang, the worthiest proud hero in the world."

At the fortieth anniversary of the Battle of Hengyang, the veteran's association of the Japanese 68th Division went on a ten-day trip to Hengyang, paying respects to their comrades whose bodies had been forever left behind on foreign soil.

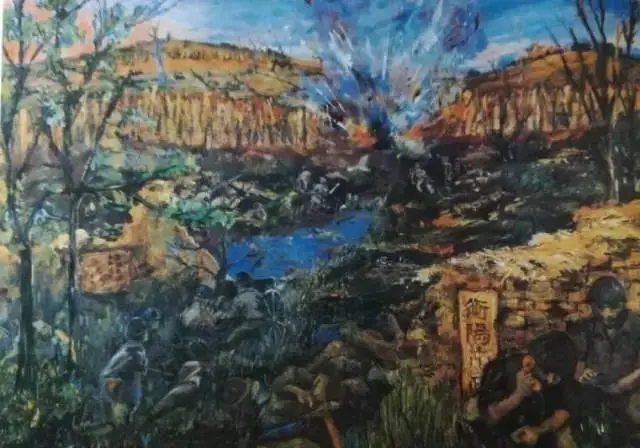
Japanese oil painting "The Battle of Hengyang"

Brought back with them were water from the Xiang River, which they would present to General Fang's soul at his tomb, and dirt of the city, which was to serve as the color sample for an artist to produce an oil painting The Battle of Hengyang. The painting depicts Chinese soldiers in the background high on the hills throwing hand-grenades, while in the foreground at the foot of the hills dead bodies of Japanese troops pile up, a nightmarish scene at Mt. Zhangjia that had been haunting the survivors of the 68th Division for four decades.

Back in mainland China in 1984, the local Hengyang government restored the words "Hengyang Memorial City in Resistance of Japan" to the monument and even increased its height. Two years later, Mr. Zhonglin Wu (Chinese: 邬仲麟), who had helped the 10th Army with timber supplies for defense works forty-two years earlier, ventured to submit a letter to Hengyang People's Political Consultative Conference, appealing for reconstruction of the tomb of the dead 10th Army soldiers. Around the same time, Pei Xiao, a local historian, also quietly started researching the Battle of Hengyang.

The public consciousness and recognition nationwide in mainland China, nevertheless, had to wait for two more decades. In 2005, the sixtieth anniversary of the end of World War II, then Party leader Jintao Hu (Chinese: 胡锦涛) was the first to openly admit that Chiang Kai-shek's National Revolutionary Army made crucial contributions on the battlefield. This pushed open the gates to a flood of books about the Battle of Hengyang. In the following two decades, the remaining survivors of the battle, who had for half of a century tried not to reveal their service in the Nationalist army, stood up and told combat stories about Hengyang. More and more people, including many descendants of the battle, became involved in studies of the battle, producing books, memoirs, essays, novels, art works, exhibitions, documentaries, TV series, YouTube programs, TikTok videos, and a film. The torn-down tomb of the soldiers of the 10th Army who died in the Battle of Hengyang is yet to be rebuilt, even though multiple appeals have been made, including by Bocun Hao (Chinese: 郝柏村), former Premier of Taiwan, who strongly advocated it on his visit to Mt. Zhangjia in 2015.

In the English-speaking world over the last decade, the Battle of Hengyang is gradually emerging from efforts to raise awareness of the Chinese contribution on the Asian Front in World War II. In 2010, Qisheng Wang's essay claiming that Hengyang was "one of the most ferociously contested battles of World War II" was collected in a book on the Sino-Japanese War of 1937-1945. Rana Mitter, in his 2013 book, criticized Joseph Stilwell's insistence that Chiang Kai-shek must send his best troops on a "quixotic journey into Burma" and allow two State Department officials to go to Yan'an at the same time that "Nationalist armies were attempting to hold the line at Hengyang". And a whole chapter of Decisive Battles in Chinese History, published in 2018, is devoted to the Battle of Hengyang, in which the author comments justly: Chiang Kai-shek's "disagreements with Stilwell represented the conventional but mistaken view of Chinese weakness and supposed lack of desire to fight. The Battle of Hengyang ... was one of the most desperately fought and intense conflicts of the entire war, yet few outside of China seem to know about it or care."

== Sources ==
- Atkins, Carolyn; Isbister, Betty A., eds. (1987). Where the Cranes Fly: The Adventures of Edith F. Millican, M.D. in China, 1943 -1948. Muriel Boone – Consultant. Albuquerque, New Mexico: Albuquerque Printing Company.
- Bai, Tianlin (1984). 抗日圣战中的衡阳保卫战 [The Battle of Defending Hengyang in the Sacred War against Japanese Invasion] (in Chinese). Taiwan: Defense Department Printing Works.
- "衡阳保卫战" [Battle of Hengyang] (in Chinese). China.
- "The Far Eastern Front". China at War. XIII (3). New York, U.S.A.: China Information Committee, Chungking Chian, printed and distributed by the Chinese News Service, an Agency of the Chinese Government. September 1944.
- Deane, Morgan (2018). Decisive Battles in Chinese History. Yardley: Westholme. ISBN 978-1594162893.
- Ge, Xiancai (2005). 葛先才将军抗战回忆录 [General Ge's Resistance Memoir] (in Chinese). Taiwan: Wangyangming Educational Foundation. ISBN 986-81871-0-9.
- Headquarters Fourteenth Air Force. Maxwell Air Force Base, AL: USAF Historical Archives, Air Force Historical Research Agency (AFHRA).
- Hengyang Committee of Chinese People's Political Consultative Conference (PCC) (2005). 衡阳抗战铸名城 [Hengyang Battle Makes City Famous] (in Chinese). Beijing: China Culture and History Press. ISBN 7-5034-1711-0.
- Huang, Qiang (1974) [1st edition 1973, 2nd edition 1977]. 衡阳抗战四十八天 [Forty-eight Days fighting for Hengyang] (in Chinese). Taibei: Yanzheng Printing House. Taiwan License 6343.
- Huang, Tianhua (November 2020). "抗战后期地方军人筹组"西南联防政府"及各方因应" [Local Military Organizing "Southwest Joint Defense Government" and Responses From All Parties Late in the Sino-Japanese War]. Journal of Sichuan Normal University (Social Sciences Edition) (in Chinese). 47 (6): 148–163.
- Jiang, Hongxi (2005) [posthumous, written in 1946]. 血泪忆衡阳 [Remembering Hengyang in Blood and Tears] (in Chinese). Nanjing: Jiangsu Literature and Art Publishing House. ISBN 7-5399-2245-1.
- "Kuomintang Order of Battle". Pacific War Online Encyclopedia.
- Liu, Taiping (2007). 衡阳保卫战: 遥远的枪声 [Hengyang Battle: Sound of Guns from Long Ago]. Taibei: Shiying Publishing House. ISBN 978-986-7762-88-7.
- Lopez, Donald S. (1997). Into the Teeth of the Tiger. Washington: Smithsonian Books. ISBN 1-56098-752-9.
- Mitter, Rana (2013). China's War with Japan, 1937-1945: The Struggle for Survival. London: Allen Lane. ISBN 978-1846140105.
- Mitter, Rana (2013a). Forgotten Ally: China's World War II, 1937-1945. Houghton Mifflin Harcourt.
- "American Confirms Japanese Use of Gas: Army Chemical Officer Reports Effects on Chinese". The New York Times. 7 July 1944. p. 8.
- President's Secretary's File (PSF). Hyde Park, NY: FDR Library Digital Archives, Franklin D. Roosevelt Presidential Library and Museum.
- Romanus, Charles F.; Sunderland, Riley (1987). Stilwell's Command Problems. United States Army in World War II, China-Burma-India Theater. Washington D.C.: Center of Military History, United States Army. ISBN 978-1516805785.
- Wang, Qisheng (2010). "The Battle of Hunan and the Chinese Military's Response to Operation Ichigo". In Drea, Edward; DeVen, Hans Van; Peattie, Mark (eds.). The Battle for China: Essays on the Military History of the Sino-Japanese War of 1937-1945. Translated by Yin, Shuxi. Stanford CA: Stanford University Press. pp. 403–420.
- Wang, Yizhi (2006) [compilation]. 方先觉与衡阳会战 [General Fang and Hengyang Campaign] (in Chinese). Taibei: Fang Jun, printed by New Culture Color Printing House Ltd.
- Wang, Xuan; Lu, Hualei (2012). 1944: 从中日两军史料解读47天 [1944: Interpreting 47 Days From Both Chinese and Japanese Military Historical Materials] (in Chinese). Beijing: Xiyuan Publishing House. ISBN 978-7-5151-0237-5.
- White, Theodore H. (31 July 1944). "All we had to tell". Time. Vol. XLIV, no. 5.
- Wu, Changgong. "张家山"白骨塔"遗址寻踪记" (September 2022) [textual record]. Vol 11 Source of Hengyang Local History, pp. 162-172. Office of the Local Chronicles.
- Wu, Changgong (23 October 2016). "偶遇1946年"搜瘗忠骸"亲历者" [A Chance Meeting of a Real Participant in the Work of "Collecting and Burying Hero Bones" in 1946]. Hengyang Evening News (in Chinese). p. 4.
- Xiao, Pei (2007). 浴血孤城 [A Besieged City Bathing in Blood] (in Chinese). Hunan: Geological Mapping Printing Works.
- Xiao, Pei (2014). 衡阳保卫战 [Hengyang Battle] (in Chinese). Beijing: Unity Press. ISBN 978-7-5126-2839-7.
- Zhou, Ming (2008). 喋血孤城: 中日衡阳攻防战 [Bloodshed in a Besieged City: a Battle between China and Japan] (in Chinese). Taibei: Zhibingtang Publishing House. ISBN 978-986-84380-3-3.
- Zhou, Ming (2019). 三湘镇神泰山军: 国民革命军第十军 [Mt. Tai Army, a God Protecting Hunan: The Tenth Army of the National Revolutionary Army] (in Chinese). Taibei: Jingang Publishing Company. ISBN 978-986-97216-3-9.
