= Battle of Changde =

Battle during the Second Sino-Japanese War

Coordinates: 29.0333°N 111.6830°E

- Part of Operation 5 in the Second Sino-Japanese War of World War II
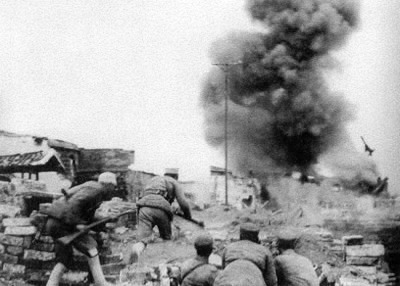
- Chinese troops in combat at Changde
| Date | 2 November 1943 – 5 January 1944 (2 months and 3 days) |
| Location | Changde city and vicinity, Hunan province, Republic of China |
| Result | Chinese victory |
| Territorial changes | Japanese capture the city, but later withdraw in January 1944 |

Belligerents
| (Republic of China (1912–1949)) Republic of China | Empire of Japan |

Commanders and leaders
| (Republic of China (1912–1949)) Sun Lianzhong (Republic of China (1912–1949)) Xue Yue (Republic of China (1912–1949)) Feng Zhi'an (Republic of China (1912–1949)) Li Yutang (Republic of China (1912–1949)) Wang Yaowu (Republic of China (1912–1949)) Liu Chen-san | (Empire of Japan) Isamu Yokoyama |

Strength
| Sixth and Ninth Military Fronts in the main battlefield: 194,594 Fifth, Sixth, and Ninth Military Fronts in supporting operations: 155,793 | 60,000+ |

Casualties and losses
| Chinese claim: Main battlefield: 23,485 killed 17,310 wounded 3,170 missing Supporting operations: (Note: The statistics of losses for the Fifth Military Front are mostly missing); 1,740 killed 2,109 wounded 360 missing Fifth Military Front supporting the Sixth Military Front: 1,159 killed 1,703 wounded 317 missing 378 unspecified casualties Japanese claim: Until 8 December 1943: 29,503 killed 14,025 captured Until 29 December 1943: 32,747 killed 14,325 captured | Japanese claim: Until 8 December 1943: 1,274 dead 2,977 wounded Until 29 December 1943: 1,666 killed Chinese claim: Main battlefield: 46,470 casualties American and British claims: 40,000+ killed and wounded Thousands of guns, ammunitions, shells, and prisoners taken and captured. |

The Battle of Changde (Battle of Changteh; traditional Chinese: 常德會戰; simplified Chinese: 常德会战; pinyin: Chángdé Huìzhàn) was a major engagement in the Second Sino-Japanese War in and around the Chinese city of Changde (Changteh) in the province of Hunan.

The purpose of the Japanese offensive was to maintain pressure on the Chinese National Revolutionary Army to reduce its combat ability in the region and its ability to reinforce the Burma Campaign.

The Japanese were initially successful in their offensive operation by bacteria-infected bombs and captured parts of the city of Changde, which forced civilians to evacuate. The Japanese were pinned down in the city by a Chinese division long enough for other Chinese units to surround them with a counterencirclement. Heavy casualties and the loss of their supply lines then forced the Japanese to withdraw, which returned territorial control to the original status quo.

Some contemporary Western newspapers depicted the battle as a Chinese victory. American government film footage showed victorious Chinese troops with Japanese prisoners and captured Japanese flags and equipment on display after the battle. In addition, an American newsreel titled Chinese troops drive Japs from Changteh showed Chinese troops firing, with dead and captured Japanese on display. A British newsreel titled Japs Loose Changteh Aka Japs Lose Changte showed similar footage.

== Japanese offensive ==
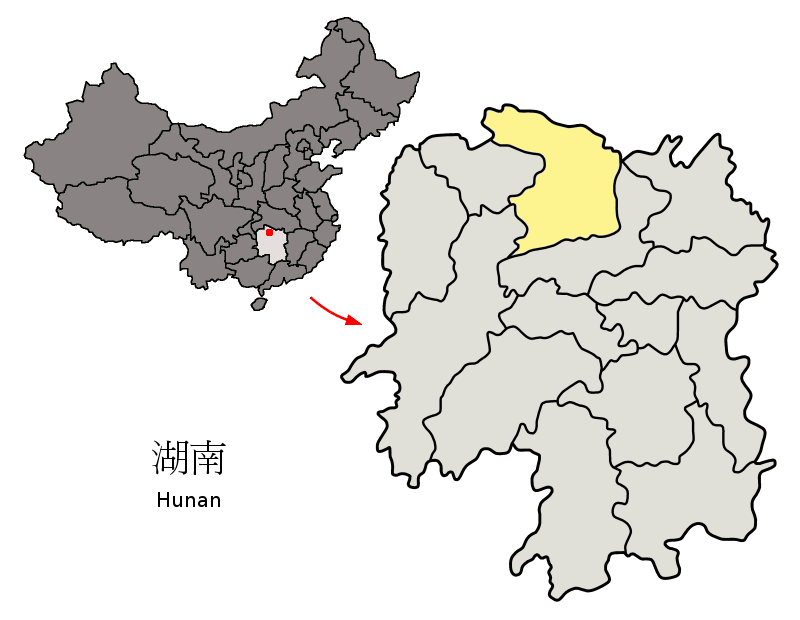
Location of Changde within Hunan Province of China

On 2 November 1943 Isamu Yokoyama, commander of the Imperial Japanese 11th Army, deployed the 39th, 58th, 13th, 3rd, 116th and 68th divisions—a total of around 60,000 troops—to attack Changde from the north and the east. The Changde region was defended by the Chinese 6th War Zone's 10th, 26th, 29th and 33rd Army Groups, as well as a river defense force and two other corps, for a total of 14 corps.

On 14 November the Japanese 13th Division, with aid from collaborators, drove south and broke through the defensive lines of the Chinese 10th and the 29th Group Armies. On 16 November, Japanese airborne forces landed in Taoyuan County to support the assault on the city proper. At the same time, the Japanese 3rd and 116th Divisions also joined the combined assault. The city was guarded by one Chinese division - the 74th Corps' 57th Division commander Yu Chengwan led 8,000 men to fight against the two invading Japanese divisions. Despite being outnumbered by more than three to one, the Chinese stubbornly held onto the city. Eleven days and nights of fierce fighting saw heavy casualties on both sides. When the Chinese reinforcements finally arrived in the city, they managed to evacuate the remaining 100 survivors in the 57th Division, all of whom were wounded, from the city. On 6 December the city of Changde fell to the Japanese control.

While the Chinese 57th Division pinned down the Japanese in the city, the rest of the 74th Corps, as well as the 18th, 73rd, 79th and 100th Corps and the 9th War Zone's 10th Corps, 99th Corps and Jiangxi's 58th Corps, arrived at the battlefield, forming a counter-encirclement on the Japanese forces.

== Chinese counteroffensive ==
Fang Xianjue's 10th Corps was first to strike, successfully retaking Deshan on 29 November before attacking the Japanese positions at Changde from the south. Unable to withstand the fierce Chinese assault, the Japanese utilized chemical weapons. The battle lasted for six days and nights, during which the Chinese Reserve 10th Division's commander Lieutenant General Sun Mingjin received 5 gunshot wounds to the body and was killed in action.

At this time other Chinese units were also pressing onto the Japanese positions. On 11 December Chinese reinforcements broke through the Japanese lines and into the city, which resulted in intense house-to-house fighting. The Chinese then proceeded to cut the Japanese supply lines. Depleted of food and ammunition, the Japanese retreated on 13 December. The Chinese pursued them for more than 20 days. By 5 January 1944 Japanese forces had withdrawn to their original positions before the offensive. Following the battle, the Chinese displayed an array of captured Japanese weapons and equipment, as well as numerous Japanese troops taken as prisoners, for inspection by allied military observers.

During this campaign, apart from the Reserve 10th Division's Sun Mingjin, two other Chinese division commanders were killed: the 44th Corps' 150th Division's Lieutenant General Xu Guozhang was killed at Taifushan in Changde's northwest, aged 37, while the 73rd corps' 5th Division's Lieutenant General Peng Shiliang(zh:彭士量) was killed at the Taoyuan-Shimen line, aged 38.

The Changde campaign saw the largest participation of the Chinese air force since the Battle of Wuhan.

Reporter Israel Epstein witnessed and reported on the battle. Witold Urbanowicz, a Polish fighter ace engaged in air combat over China in 1943, saw the city just after the battle.

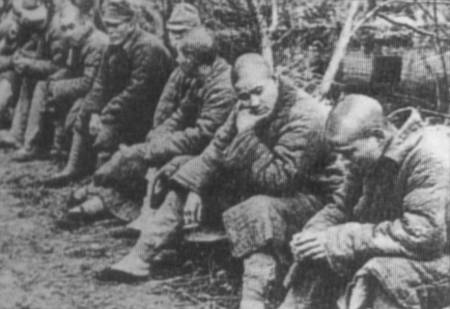
Japanese prisoners taken at Changde.

== Aftermath ==
After Yu Chengwan broke out and led his remaining men to counterattack Changde, the divisional commander was detained and held in trial for abandoning the city. The military court believed that his circumstance was forgivable as he had lead his troops to defend Changde for twelve days, and sentenced him to five years in prison. However, Chiang Kai-Shek initially did not approve it as he wanted the divisional commander executed. Eventually, with the pleas of Sun Lianzhong and others, Yu Chengwan was spared from execution. Fang Xianjue, the commander of the 10th corps, and Zhu Yue (朱岳), the commander of the 190th division, were both dismissed for the crime of 'preserving strength'. This accusation stemmed from the delaying of the 190th division from assisting the 3rd division in breaking through Changde due to resentments between the divisional commander and corps commander. However, similar to the case with the Second Battle of Changsha, the newly appointed commander of the 10th corps failed to take up post before the battle of Hengyang, resulting in Fang Xianjue continuing his post as corps commander.

After the battle, Sun Lianzhong ordered the burial of the 6,747 soldiers killed in action in the Changde city. The 74th corps "undertook the most arduous tasks. The officers and soldiers at all levels fought tenaciously with loyalty, bravery, and sacrifices. Their tragic and magnificent conduct, outstanding combat record, excellent training, and strict discipline made them exemplary models for the Nationalist army." The 57th division "defended Changde for fifteen bloody days and nights. The enemy employed aircraft, heavy artillery, poison gas, and incendiary attacks, yet our officers and soldiers held on with their flesh and blood. Especially on the 1st and 2nd of December, when all of our fortifications were completely destroyed, our remaining more than 100 officers and soldiers still used the corpses on the battlefield as obstacles, engaging the enemy in hand-to-hand combat with knives and throwing rocks with unprecedented brutality and heroism. The division was able to pin down the enemy's 3rd, 68th, and 116th divisions, and a portion of the 40th division, causing more than 10,000 losses and contributing to the success of encircling the enemy." The artillery regiment of the 74th corps "was assigned to the 57th division for the defense of Changde. The infantry and artillery coordinated well, allowing the artillery to unleash its full potential, completely annihilating the enemy. When they run out of shells, the artillerymen joined the infantry in combat, throwing grenades and charging the enemy, sacrificing down to the last man and bringing honor to the soldiers of the special forces." On August 3, 1944, the Nationalist Government awarded the Flying Tiger Flag for each of the three units.

133rd infantry regiment (Arashi Unit 6214) member Koichi Urata admitted that Japanese were slaughtered at the battle of Changde, saying "most of the wounded never returned" and they lost "heavy casualties" and that Japan needed entirely new green conscripts with no combat experience for the attack on Changsha, Hengyang and Guilin during Ichigo to replace the dead from Changde.

Harrison Forman at Changde took pictures of Chinese troops dressed up in captured Japanese equipment. Japanese soldiers captured by Chinese and a Japanese mustard gas munition being carried by a Chinese soldier.

Video was recorded of the battle including Japanese prisoners and captured Japanese equipment.

== In pop culture ==
The 2010 Chinese war film Death and Glory in Changde is based on the events in this battle.

== See also ==
- Battle of Changde order of battle

== Sources ==
- Long-hsuen, Hsu; Ming-kai, Chang (1971). History of The Sino-Japanese War (1937–1945). Translated by Ha-hsiung, Wen (2nd ed.). Taipei: Chung Wu Publishing. pp. 412–416 Map 38.
- Barenblatt, Daniel (2004). A Plague Upon Humanity. Harper Collins. pp. 220–221.
