= 116th Division (Imperial Japanese Army) =

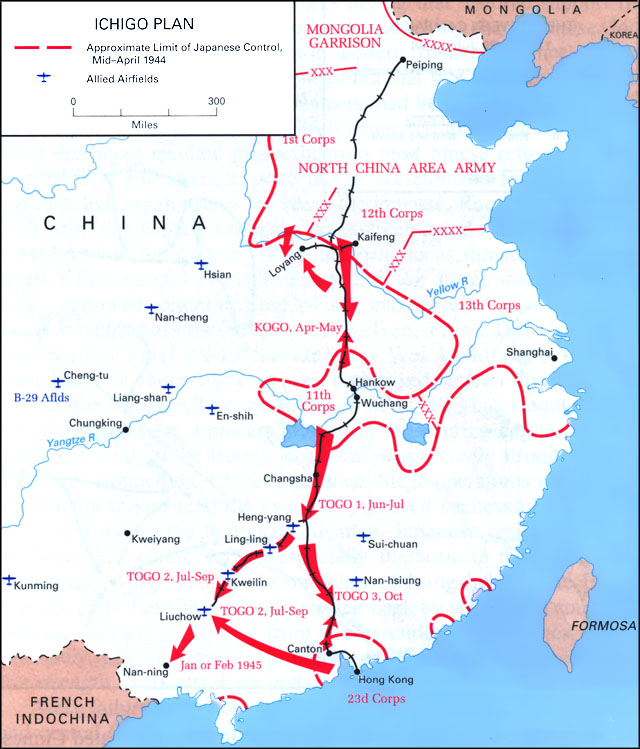
- A map of the Japanese Plan for Operation Ichi-Go
- Active: 1938 - 1945
- Country: Empire of Japan
- Branch: Imperial Japanese Army
- Type: Infantry
- Size: 25000
- Garrison/HQ: Kyoto
- Nickname: Storm Division
- Engagements: Battle of Wuhan; Battle of Nanchang; Zhejiang-Jiangxi campaign Battle of Changde; Battle of Changsha (1944); Operation Ichi-Go; Defense of Hengyang; Battle of West Henan–North Hubei

Commanders
- Notable commanders: Yoshishige Shimizu

The 116th Division (第116師団, Dai-hyakujūroku Shidan) was an infantry division of the Imperial Japanese Army. Its call sign was Storm Division (嵐兵団, Arashi Heidan). It was formed on 15 May 1938 in Kyoto as a B-class square division, simultaneously with the 106th Division. The nucleus for the formation was the 16th Division headquarters. The division was originally subordinated to the Central China Expeditionary Army.

== Action ==
The division landed in Shanghai on 24 June 1938, and was immediately sent to the Dabie Mountains and Battle of Wuhan through Anqing. From March 1939, a small part of the division participated in the Battle of Nanchang. After the Central China Expeditionary Army was abolished, the division was reassigned to Thirteenth Army.

In the aftermath of the Doolittle Raid 18 April 1942, the unit participated in the Zhejiang-Jiangxi campaign. In December 1942, the 138th Infantry Regiment was transferred to the 31st Division, therefore the 116th division became a triangular division.

In November 1943, the division fought in the Battle of Changde, and from May 1944 - in the Battle of Changsha (1944).

In October 1944, it was transferred to Twentieth Army and take a part in the Defense of Hengyang as a part of Operation Ichi-Go. During the intensive 40-day assault of Chinese positions, the division has suffered major losses but was able to capture the city. From March 1945, it also participated in the Battle of West Henan–North Hubei with the help of the newly created 86th Independent Mixed Brigade. By the day of the surrender of Japan on 15 August 1945, the division was still in Hengyang.

== See also ==
- List of Japanese Infantry Divisions

== Notes ==
- This article incorporates material from Japanese Wikipedia page 第116師団 (日本軍), accessed 17 June 2016
