= Isamu Yokoyama =

Japanese officer and war criminal (1889–1952)

- 横山 勇
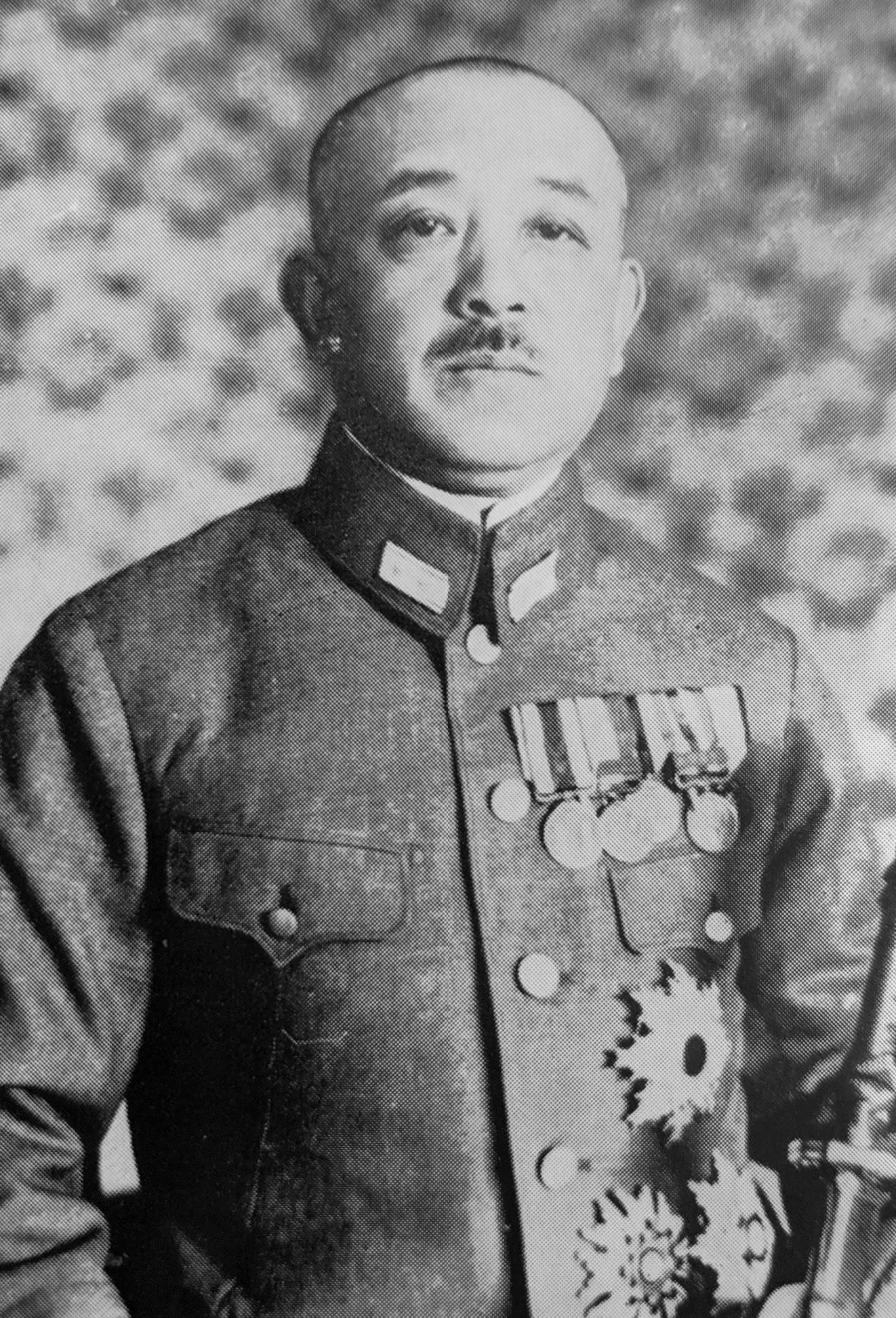
- Born: 1 March 1889; Chiba Prefecture, Empire of Japan
- Died: 21 April 1952 (aged 63); Sugamo Prison, Tokyo, Occupied Japan
- Military career
- Allegiance: Empire of Japan
- Branch: Imperial Japanese Army
- Service years: 1909–1945
- Rank: Lieutenant General
- Conflicts: Second Sino-Japanese War; World War II

Isamu Yokoyama (横山 勇, Yokoyama Isamu; 1 March 1889 – 21 April 1952) was a general in the Imperial Japanese Army, commanding Japanese ground forces in China during the Second Sino-Japanese War and Pacific War. In 1948, he was sentenced to death by a military commission for Yokohama War Crimes Trials due to his direct command responsibility for vivisection and other human medical experiments performed at the Kyushu Imperial University on downed Allied airmen. His sentence was later commuted to life imprisonment and he died in prison in 1952.

== Biography ==
Yokoyama was born in Chiba Prefecture as the son of a colonel in the Imperial Japanese Army; however, the Yokoyama clan was originally from what is now Fukushima Prefecture, where they were samurai in service of Aizu Domain. He attended military preparatory schools in Himeji and Osaka and graduated from the 21st class of the Imperial Japanese Army Academy in December 1909. He served with the IJA 3rd Infantry Regiment as a junior officer. He graduated from the 27th class of the Army Staff College in December 1915.

In his early career, Yokoyama served in the Imperial Japanese Army General Staff Office and at the Army Ministry. From January 1925 to March 1927 he was assigned as a military attaché to Germany. On his return, he again served in various bureaucratic posts involved in military production and resources planning. After his promotion to lieutenant colonel in 1929, he served as chief of the 2nd Section of the Cabinet Planning Board. He was transferred to the staff of the Kwantung Army in April 1932, and was promoted to colonel in August of the same year. After serving as chief of the Mobilization Section, Economic Mobilization Bureau at the Ministry of War in 1933, Yokoyama served as battalion commander of the IJA 2nd Regiment in 1934 and was promoted to the staff of the IJA 6th Division in 1936. In March 1937, he was promoted to major general.

A specialist in resources allocation, Yokoyama was appointed Head of the Planning Bureau of the Cabinet Resources Board in 1937. He was promoted to lieutenant general in August 1939. In September of the same year, he returned to Manchukuo as commander of the IJA 1st Division. In October 1941, he was promoted to commander of the IJA 4th Army, which was based at Bei'an, the capital of a northern Manchukuo province of the same name, that was heavily fortified with various ground emplacements against possible incursions by the Soviet Red Army. From 21 December 1942, he was commander of the IJA 11th Army, which was in combat at the Battle of Changde from 2 November 1943 – 20 December 1943. He was later involved in the capture of Henyang and the Battle of Changsha during Operation Ichi-Go in August 1944.

Yokoyama was reassigned back to mainland Japan as commander of both the Western District Army and the Japanese Sixteenth Area Army in November 1944. These were home guard and garrison organizations responsible for recruitment and civil defense, and were intended to oppose the projected American invasion of western Japan. He was based in Fukuoka at the time of the surrender of Japan.

In July 1946, Yokoyama was arrested by the U.S. occupation authorities on suspicion of war crimes. In 1948, he was sentenced to death by a military commission for Yokohama War Crimes Trials due to his direct command responsibility for vivisection and other human medical experiments performed at the Kyushu Imperial University on downed Allied airmen. However, Yokoyama's sentence was later commuted to life in prison. He died in prison in 1952.
