= Fang Xianjue =

Chinese general (1903–1983)

- 方先覺
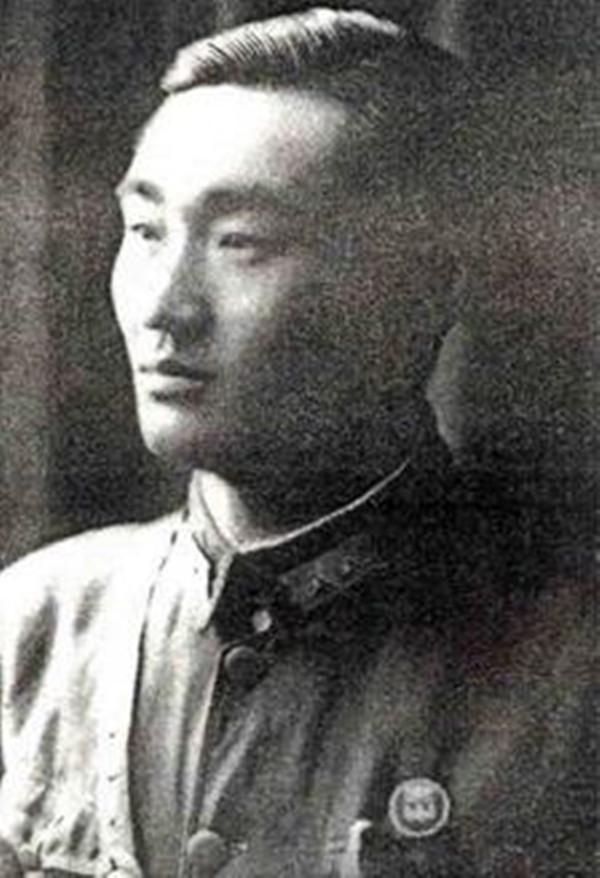
- General Fang Xianjue
- Born: 22 November 1903; Xiao County, Jiangsu, Qing China (now Xiao County, Anhui)
- Died: 3 March 1983 (aged 79); Taipei, Taiwan
- Military career
- Allegiance: Republic of China
- Branch: National Revolutionary Army; Republic of China Army
- Service years: 1926–1968
- Rank: General
- Commands: 10th Army
- Conflicts: Second Sino-Japanese War; Battle of Xuzhou; Battle of Taierzhuang; Operation 5; Battle of Changde; Operation Ichi-Go; Changsha-Hengyang campaign; Defense of Hengyang (surrendered)
- Awards: Order of Blue Sky and White Sun

Fang Xianjue (traditional Chinese: 方先覺; simplified Chinese: 方先觉; Wade–Giles: Fang Hsien-chueh; 22 November 1903 – 3 March 1983) was a Chinese National Revolutionary Army general during the Second Sino-Japanese War. Under his command, the Chinese 10th Army defended Hengyang for 48 days during Operation Ichi-Go in 1944.

== Biography ==
Fang was born in a small Jiangsu (now in Suzhou, Anhui) village in 1903. After studying in his village, he went to Xuzhou Provincial High School, and later studied at the Nanjing First Industrial School, then later went to National Central University (later renamed Nanjing University in mainland China and reinstated in Taiwan after 1949). After completing his formal education, he decided to attend the Whampoa Military Academy and graduated in the class of 1926. He started as a platoon leader in the National Revolutionary Army (NRA), and was eventually promoted to the rank of army general during the Second Sino-Japanese War, participating in the Battle of Taierzhuang, the Battle of Changde, and the Battle of Changsha.

From June 1944, Fang commanded the 10th Army in the Defense of Hengyang, where he was besieged for 48 days after fighting off numerous assaults by the Imperial Japanese Army. On the night of 8 August 1944 he telegraphed the Chongqing Nationalist government about the heavy Chinese resistance and his willingness to fight to the death for the sake of the country. After running out of ammunition and supplies, and with no hope of reinforcement, he surrendered to the Japanese on the condition that all POWs would not be harmed and all wounded Chinese soldiers would get medical treatment. Initially, he tried to kill himself with a sword given to himself by Chiang Kai-shek, but was dissuaded by his staff officers. The battle at Hengyang resulted in almost 30,000 Japanese casualties (nearly half of the casualties suffered during the entire Japanese offensive); on the other hand, the Chinese suffered 7,400 casualties. He was held at the Catholic church at Hengyang, on the night of 19 November, he escaped by disguising himself and climbing over the church wall. With the help of guerillas, he went to Chongqing and received a hero's welcome from Chiang Kai-shek, and was decorated with the Order of Blue Sky and White Sun. Fang later accused the Japanese of murdering Chinese prisoners and reneging on their promise to treat POWs by international law.

After the Kuomintang was defeated in the Chinese Civil War, Fang transferred to Taiwan and became the deputy commander of the Penghu Defense Command. He retired from the military in 1968 and died of a heart attack in Taipei on 3 March 1983. The surviving veterans of the Japanese 11th Army who personally participated in the battle of Hengyang organized a group trip to Taipei to pay their respects to Fang.
