= Liu Zhensan =

Chinese Nationalist general (1903–1982)

Liu Zhensan (traditional Chinese: 劉振三; simplified Chinese: 刘振三; pinyin: Liú Zhènsān; Wade–Giles: Liu Chen-san; 17 March 1903 – 13 June 1971) was a Chinese National Revolutionary Army general in the Second Sino-Japanese War.

== Biography ==
Liu was born in Hebei. He was a member of the Guominjun before joining the National Revolutionary Army.

At the beginning of the Second Sino-Japanese War, Liu commanded a brigade of the 38th Division in the Battle of Beiping–Tianjin that beat back the Japanese in the Langfang area. From late 1937 to 1943 he was the general commanding the 180th Division in the Battle of Xuzhou and Western Hebei Operation. In 1943, he was given command of 59th Corps which he held to the end of the war. He commanded the 59th Corps during the Battle of Changde and the Battle of West Henan–North Hubei.

In January 1949, Liu was transferred to the deputy commander of the Shanghai Guard Headquarters but resigned in May of the same year.

He died in Taipei in 1971.
