= Li Yutang =

- Born: 7 February 1899; Dongying, Shandong
- Died: 5 February 1951 (aged 51); Taipei, Taiwan
- Allegiance: Republic of China
- Service / branch: (Republic of China (1912–1949)) National Revolutionary Army
- Commands: 3rd Division; 36th Army Group; 27th Army Group
- Battles / wars: Second Sino-Japanese War; Battle of Shanghai; Battle of West Hunan

Li Yutang (Chinese: 李玉堂) was a KMT general from Guangrao County, Shandong. Li Yutang was a prominent member of the Hong Kong branch of the Tongmenghui (Chinese Revolutionary Alliance) in the late Qing dynasty. In 1937, he participated in the Battle of Shanghai as commander of the 3rd Division. In 1945, he fought in the Zhijiang Campaign, also known as the Battle of Xuefeng Mountains, in western Hunan.
