= Battle of Changsha (1944) =

Japanese invasion of Hunan, China during the Second Sino-Japanese War

- Part of Operation Ichi-Go in the Second Sino-Japanese War of World War II
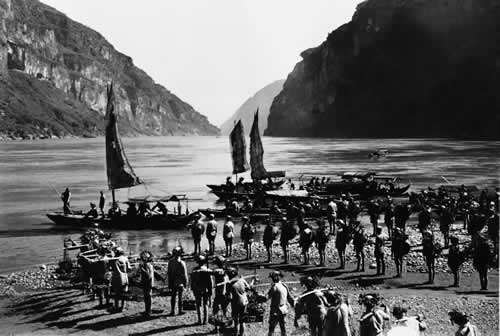
- Chinese Army in the battle
Date	26 May 1944 – 8 August 1944 (2 months, 1 week and 6 days)
Location	Changsha and Hengyang, China 28.2000°N 112.9670°E
Result	Japanese victory

Belligerents
China	Empire of Japan

Commanders and leaders
(Republic of China (1912–1949)) Xue Yue (Republic of China (1912–1949)) Fang Xianjue	(Empire of Japan) Isamu Yokoyama (Empire of Japan) Yasuji Okamura

Strength
Forty-three divisions totaling 286,000 troops	Chinese claim: ten divisions and four independent brigades totaling 200,000 troops

Casualties and losses
Chinese claim: 32,009 killed and 52,985 wounded (Note: From 25 May until 10 October 1944); 86,752 killed or wounded and 21,531 missing (Note: Until early September 1944) Japanese claim (until the fall of Hengyang): 66,468 killed and 22,460 captured	Chinese claim: 31,354 killed and 58,136 wounded 104,675 killed or wounded and 447 captured Japanese claim: Until 20th July 1944 : 3,860 killed 8,327 wounded 7,099 sick 19,286 total Estimated to have reached 40,000–50,000 casualties (including from illness) by mid-August and 60,000 by late August Until early September : 7,602 killed 13,174 wounded 20,183 sick

The Battle of Changsha of 1944 (also known as the Battle of Hengyang or Campaign of Changsha-Hengyang; Chinese: 長衡會戰) was an invasion of the Chinese province of Hunan by Japanese troops near the end of the Second Sino-Japanese War. As such, it encompasses three separate conflicts: an invasion of the city of Changsha and two invasions of Hengyang.

The Japanese military transferred the bulk of their troops from the Japanese homeland and Manchuria as part of Operation "Ichi-Go" or "Tairiku Datsu Sakusen" which roughly translates as 'Operation to Break through the Continent'. This was an attempt to establish a land and rail corridor from the Japanese occupied territories of Manchuria, Northern and Central China and Korea and those in South East Asia.

== Japanese objectives ==
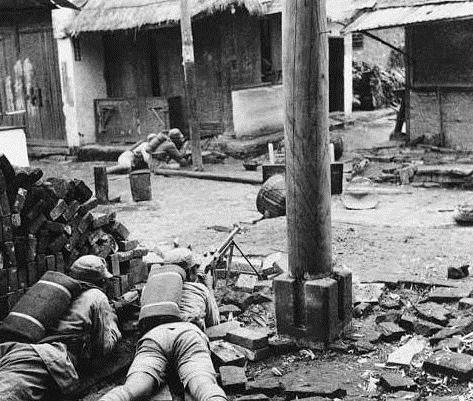
Chinese soldiers taking positions during the battle in May 1944

Changsha is the capital city of Hunan province and an important junction of two railroads in southern China: the tri-province railroad of Hunan-Guizhou-Guangxi and the one from Canton to Wuhan. Hengyang is also on the tri-province railroad and very close to the Canton-Wuhan Railroad. Furthermore, Lake Dongting and the cities of Changsha, Hengyang, and Lingling, are connected by the Xiang River. It was imperative for both sides to control the suburban areas of Changsha and Hengyang.

The tactical objective of the Japanese China Expeditionary Army was to secure the railroad of Hunan-Guizhou-Guangxi and the southern area of China. The United States 14th Air Force of United States Army Air Forces also stationed their fighters and bombers at several air bases along the three-province railroad: Hengyang, Lingling, Guilin, Liuzhou, and Nanning. From there, the American Flying Tigers led by Brigadier General Claire Lee Chennault, had inflicted heavy damage on Japanese troops both in China and Formosa and could launch air strikes against the home islands of Japan.

After several ineffective air strikes by the Imperial Japanese Army Air Service, the Japanese decided to use ground forces to deny Allied air power these air bases. By a direct order from Shunroku Hata, Commander-in-Chief of the Japanese China Expeditionary Army, the Japanese 11th Army stationed at Wuhan was given the mission to attack Changsha and advance southwest via the tri-province railroad. It was later to join forces with the Japanese 23rd Army of the Japanese Sixth Area Army from Canton.

General Isamu Yokoyama (橫山勇), the two-star general of the Japanese 11th Army, headed five divisions reinforced by four more divisions and three independent brigades. Shunroku Hata decided to stay at Wuhan from 25 May 1944 until the end of the second phase of Operation Ichi-Go.

== Battle of Hengyang ==
Two Japanese military detachments moved on to besiege Hengyang, but the NRA's understrength Tenth Corps under the command of Fang Xianjue repelled their advance twice. The predicament in Hengyang helped hasten the crumbling of Hideki Tojo's cabinet. In conjunction with the loss of Saipan on 9 July 1944, Tojo and his cabinet handed in their resignation on 18 July 1944.

In August 1944, Japanese troops led by three two-star generals again attacked Hengyang with air support. Chinese troops resisted fiercely aided by local knowledge and constructing effective barricades up to four meters high. The Chinese defenses were intelligently constructed and used crossfire zones to maximize firepower. This caused the Japanese 68th and 116th Divisions to lose morale and it began preparations for retreat. Morale rose, however, when the Japanese 58th Division broke into the northwest perimeter of the city, defended by the Chinese Third Division and the attack resumed. Reinforcements from five Corps: the 37th, 62nd, 74th, 79th, and 100th, attempted many times to reach Hengyang, but were blocked by four Japanese divisions: the 27th, 34th, 40th, and 64th.

The Japanese eventually captured the Chinese Tenth Corps commander Fang Xianjue, who surrendered Hengyang on 8 August 1944 after his Tenth Corps was decimated, down from seventeen thousand to three thousand men (including the wounded). This concluded the Campaign of Changsha-Hengyang.

=== The defeated Tenth Corps ===
The Chinese Military Affairs Commission reactivated the headquarters of the Tenth Corps at Yi-San in Guangxi after the defeat of Hengyang. Li Yu-tang was the commanding general of the parent unit of the Tenth Corps.

Some of the surviving Tenth Corps soldiers slipped through the Japanese lines and returned to the new corps headquarters on foot. Of the imprisoned three thousand wounded Chinese soldiers, one thousand died of starvation, injury, sickness or mistreatment by the Japanese.

Most of the captured Chinese general officers at Hengyang managed to break through the Japanese lines separately. On 19 September 1944, Fang Xianjue was rescued by a clandestine team from the Changsha Station of the "Military-Statistics Bureau" of the Military Affairs Commission and was personally received by Chiang Kai-shek at Chiang's Chongqing residence on 14 December 1944. Against the unofficial military traditions in east Asia, "Fang and his five tiger-like generals," who surrendered the Chinese Tenth Corps to the Japanese, were welcomed in Chongqing; they were also awarded the Order of Blue Sky and White Sun. Fang and two other generals were given full command of new full-strength divisions. At the same time, Fang was also assigned to the two-star deputy commander of the 37th Army Group. All six general officers remained on active military duty until after the end of the war.

== Aftermath ==
After 47 days of bitter fighting, Japanese troops managed to occupy Hengyang with a high price in casualties over the city of Hengyang - many people died, including 390 Japanese commissioned officers dead and another 520 wounded. One of the field hospitals of the Japanese 68th Division recorded that about 4,000 wounded and sick soldiers were received by the hospital during the battle of Hengyang, of whom ninety percent died. The 68th and 116th Divisions lost their combat strength and were reassigned to garrison duties. Thus, the Chinese troops to the north were able to expand their influence despite the loss of Hengyang city. The Japanese 11th Army received 100,000 additional soldiers to supplement the combat and non-combat losses in the Changsha-Hengyang campaign.

On the side of the Chinese National Revolutionary Army, Xue's Ninth Military Front in this campaign lost two effective corps loyal to Chiang Kai-Shek: the 4th and the 10th corps. This rendered "Tiger Xue" a toothless tiger until the end of the Second Sino-Japanese War.

Sequentially, the Japanese 11th Army moved toward Lingling, seizing it on 4 September 1944, and controlled Guilin on 10 November 1944. The Japanese China Expeditionary Army ostensibly had completed the strategic objective of the Imperial Japanese General Staff: linking up by occupation their territories in east Asia, (although they did not have enough manpower to maintain actual control over it due to their heavy losses).

Moreover, the United States Army Air Forces transferred all their bomber groups in the above Chinese air bases to newly captured Saipan in July 1944, during the battle of Hengyang. From Saipan, United States aerial fleets began their bombing campaign against the home islands of Japan. One of the Japanese tactical achievements in this bloody campaign, (Operation Ichi-Go), had been easily neutralized by a simple American military maneuver in the Pacific.

After the battle of Hengyang, the Japanese could not continue to fight effectively. During this period Japan discovered that government privileges from Wang Jingwei's puppet regime were useless. Consequently, they rejected plans to take more Chinese territory. At the same time their negotiating position with China became significantly less powerful—to the point where they agreed to set aside the "Tang Ju" treaty.

The Chinese government continued to pressure the Japanese to completely withdraw from the northeast. The Japanese, in a desperate measure, collected as many troops as possible in April 1945 to invade a heavy settlement (Zhijiang) in the west of Hunan, hoping to open a path to Sichuan. The troops were intercepted and almost completely wiped out in an ambush by the Chinese National Guard. China regained some of its territory. At this point, the course of the war had turned. The Japanese subsequently surrendered at the Zijiang River.

== See also ==
- Battle of Changsha (1939)
- Battle of Changsha (1941)
- Battle of Changsha (1941–1942)
- Battle of Changsha (TV series), the TV series depicting this event

== Bibliography ==
- Liu Taiping, 衡陽保衛戰 Defense of Hengyang, Taiwan Elite Publishing House, 2007, ISBN 978-986-7762-88-7
