= Xue Yue =

General of the National Revolutionary Army (1896–1998)

- 薛岳
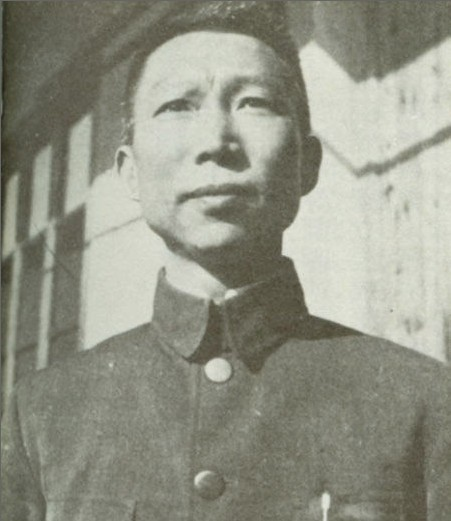
- Xue in 1938
- Born: December 26, 1896; Lechang County, Shaozhou Prefecture, Guangdong, Qing China (now Lechang city in Shaoguan, Guangdong, China)
- Died: May 4, 1998 (aged 101); Taipei, Taiwan
- Military career
- Allegiance: Republic of China
- Branch: National Revolutionary Army
- Service years: 1914–1950
- Rank: General
- Nicknames: Patton of Asia, God of War, Tiger of Changsha
- Conflicts: Northern Expedition; Chinese Civil War; Encirclement Campaigns; Long March; Dingtao Campaign; Landing Operation on Hainan Island; Second Sino-Japanese War; Battle of Northern and Eastern Henan; Battle of Lanfeng; Battle of Wuhan; Battle of Wanjialing; First Battle of Changsha; 1939–1940 Winter Offensive; Second Battle of Changsha; Third Battle of Changsha; Zhejiang-Jiangxi campaign; Operation 5; Battle of Changde; Operation Ichi-Go; Fourth Battle of Changsha
- Other work: Politician

Xue Yue (Chinese: 薛岳; Wade–Giles: Hsueh Yueh; December 26, 1896 – May 3, 1998) was a Chinese National Revolutionary Army general. A graduate of the Baoding Military Academy, he became one of the Nationalist Army's most effective and aggressive tacticians during the Second Sino-Japanese War and the Chinese Civil War. As the commander-in-chief of the Ninth War Zone, Xue masterminded the ingenious "Heavenly Furnace" (or "Attrition") tactic, successfully defending the vital city of Changsha against multiple major Japanese offensives and inflicting devastating casualties on Japanese forces. He was nicknamed the "Patton of Asia" by Claire Lee Chennault of the Flying Tigers.

== Early life ==
Xue Yue was born Xue Yangyue (薛仰岳) on 17 December 1896 in Xiaopingshi, a village in Lechang, Guangdong, into a Hakka farming family. He was the eldest of six brothers, three of whom also became army officers. In 1910, he went to Guangzhou to prepare for military school, and in January 1912, he joined the Tongmenghui.

Later in 1912, Xue entered the Guangdong Army Primary School at Whampoa, where his classmates included Zhang Fakui, Ye Ting, Li Hanhun, Huang Qixiang and Wu Qiwei. In 1914, he joined Sun Yat-sen's Chinese Revolutionary Party in opposition to Yuan Shikai. That September, he was arrested while travelling in French Indochina after the Guangdong military governor, Long Jiguang, told the French consul that he was a Vietnamese revolutionary, and he was released after Sun intervened. He attended the Third Army Preparatory School in Wuchang from 1915 and entered the 6th class of the Baoding Military Academy in January 1917.

== Military career ==
In 1918, Xue left Baoding without graduating to join Sun Yat-sen's army in Guangdong, and he served as a staff officer in its campaign in Fujian. In May 1921, he became commander of a battalion of Sun's presidential guard. During Chen Jiongming's revolt on 16 June 1922, his battalion defended the presidential office and helped to escort Soong Ching-ling to safety, after which he joined Sun aboard the gunboat Yongfeng. He later served under Xu Chongzhi in Fujian, where his regiment helped to recapture the Yanling Pass in May 1923, and in 1925, he took part in the second Eastern Expedition as deputy commander of the 14th Division.

In the Northern Expedition, Xue commanded the 1st Division of the 1st Army, which was the first unit to enter Hangzhou, on 18 February 1927. On 22 March, at the request of Shanghai's General Labour Union and against the objections of Bai Chongxi, he moved his division into Shanghai during a workers' uprising there. Chiang Kai-shek regarded the division as politically unreliable, and on 5 April, shortly before the purge of the Communists, he moved it out of the city and relieved Xue of his command.

Xue then joined Li Jishen in Guangdong. In the autumn of 1927, his division defeated the army of the Nanchang uprising at Tangkeng, and in December, under Zhang Fakui, it took part in suppressing the Guangzhou Uprising. Over the next four years, Xue moved between factions opposed to Chiang: he served as deputy commander of the 4th Army, joined the opposition led by Wang Jingwei, and fought alongside the New Guangxi clique in the Central Plains War of 1930. He was principal of the Liuzhou Military Academy until he resigned in January 1932.

== Campaigns against the Communists (1933–1937) ==
In May 1933, Chiang recalled Xue as commander of the 5th Army for the fifth encirclement campaign against the Jiangxi Soviet, reportedly at the urging of Chen Cheng. Commanding the 6th Route Army, he took Xingguo and, in October 1934, Shicheng, threatening the Communist capital at Ruijin. After the Red Army began the Long March, Xue led the pursuit through Hunan and Guangxi into Guizhou, where he became director of the Guiyang Pacification Office in 1935. His forces failed to trap the Red Army during its four crossings of the Chishui River, and it escaped across the Jinsha and Dadu rivers.

The campaign also extended the central government's control over Guizhou. Xue replaced the local garrison of Guiyang with central troops and pressed the provincial governor, Wang Jialie, to resign in favour of Wu Zhongxin. He was made a lieutenant general in April 1935 and given the rank of general in September 1936, and in May 1937, he became chairman of the Guizhou provincial government.

== Second Sino-Japanese War ==
In September 1937, Xue was given command of the 19th Army Group in the Battle of Shanghai, where his troops suffered heavy losses around Luodian and Nanxiang. After the Japanese landing at Jinshanwei in November, he directed the withdrawal of the Chinese left wing. In May 1938, as commander of the 1st Army Corps, he directed the Battle of Lanfeng against Kenji Doihara's 14th Division. His attempt to destroy the division failed after Kuei Yung-ching abandoned Lanfeng without orders and Huang Chieh withdrew from Shangqiu. During the Battle of Wuhan, Xue commanded the defence of the Nanchang–Jiujiang railway and the western shore of Poyang Lake. In October 1938, his forces surrounded the Japanese 106th Division in the hills around Wanjialing. Chinese accounts of the Battle of Wanjialing state that more than 10,000 Japanese troops were killed.

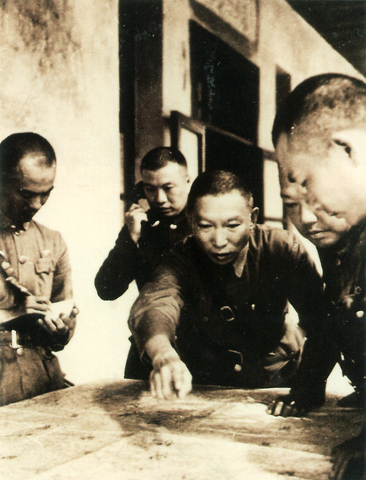
General Xue Yue discusses strategy

In January 1939, Xue became acting commander of the 9th War Zone, and in February, he also became governor of Hunan. After the fall of Nanchang in the Battle of Nanchang in March, he took responsibility for a failed counter-offensive in which the corps commander Chen Anbao was killed. In the first Battle of Changsha, in September and October 1939, Xue argued against abandoning Changsha. His forces fell back across the rivers north of the city and then attacked the Japanese flanks, and the Japanese withdrew by mid-October. During the battle, on 2 October, he was appointed commander of the 9th War Zone. In the second battle, in September 1941, Japanese forces under Korechika Anami briefly took the city before withdrawing.

Xue (center) with foreign representatives in Gannan Prefecture, China (1940s)

For the third battle, Xue developed what he called "Heavenly Furnace" tactics, in which the attackers were worn down in successive defensive belts and then encircled. The 10th Army under Li Yutang held Changsha while other armies closed in, and the Japanese withdrew in mid-January 1942. Chinese figures put Japanese casualties at about 57,000, while Japanese records give about 6,000 killed and wounded. Xue received the Order of Blue Sky and White Sun for the victory. Xue was promoted to general second class in February 1944. During Operation Ichi-Go, Changsha fell on 19 June 1944, and the garrison of Hengyang under Fang Xianjue surrendered on 8 August after a long siege.

The Kuomintang and commander of US forces in the China Burma India theater Joseph Stilwell would not support him or supply his soldiers with ammunition to fight the Japanese due to Stillwell's belief that there was rampant corruption in the Nationalist Army that resulted in generals or Kuomintang officials diverting resources away from the battlefield. To Stillwell's dismay, however, General Claire Chennault's Fourteenth Air Force supplied Xue with ammunition throughout the war, whenever this was possible. Xue's 9th Front was also responsible for protecting Chennault's airfields.

"As I prepared to leave, Hsueh walked down the long hill with me from his temporary headquarters to my plane. There was so much we were both thinking and so little either of us could put into words. Before I climbed aboard the transport I gave Hsueh the old Sam Browne belt from my pre-war Air Corps uniform. As he put it on, tears rolled down the leathery cheeks of that doughty warrior."

— Claire L. Chennault, Way of a Fighter, p. 359

Chennault and Xue became sworn brothers and remained close friends until Chennault's death in 1958. Chennault also recounts in his memoirs, "Way of a Fighter," that in July 1945, just as Chennault had resigned, he made a trip over enemy lines to see Xue Yue. Xue had marched for two days to get to the meeting, but Chennault was only able to disappoint him in his quest for arms and ammunition to launch a counteroffensive: Chennault's superiors had taken everything for an effort being organized in Chongqing.

=== Governor of Hunan ===
As governor of Hunan from 1939, Xue set out a programme summed up as "security, convenience and sufficiency", which was carried out through six policies covering public health, economic development, education, policing, social organization, and food supply and prices. His government built new provincial hospitals, banned opium and restricted prostitution. It encouraged land reclamation and the creation of farms and forestry stations, and expanded primary, secondary, teacher-training and vocational education. It also imposed severe penalties on collaborators, including summary execution for those caught guiding or supplying Japanese forces.

== Chinese Civil War (1945–1950) ==
After the Japanese surrender, Xue accepted the surrender of Japanese forces at Nanchang on 14 September 1945. In May 1946, he became director of the Xuzhou Pacification Headquarters and launched an offensive into southern Shandong. His forces lost the Reorganized 26th Division in January 1947 and were defeated in the Battle of Laiwu in February. Chiang removed Xue from the Xuzhou command in March 1947 and appointed him chief military aide to the Nationalist government. The Communist commander Su Yu described Xue as "relatively quick-witted and decisive", and he regarded his replacement by Gu Zhutong as a change for the worse.

In 1948, Xue campaigned for Sun Fo in the vice-presidential election. After the Huaihai campaign, he and other Cantonese leaders pressed for the replacement of T. V. Soong, and in December 1948, Chiang appointed Xue governor of Guangdong. In December 1949, he became commander of the defence of Hainan, where he deployed about 100,000 troops in three lines of defence known as the "Boling Line". The PLA Fourth Field Army under Deng Hua crossed the Qiongzhou Strait on 16 April 1950 and overran the island in the Battle of Hainan Island, and Xue flew to Taiwan at the end of April.

== Later life ==
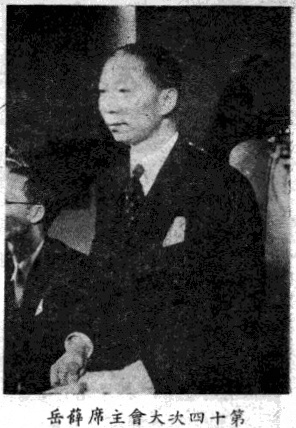
Xue at the First National Assembly of the Republic of China (1948)

Xue's relationship with Chiang became strained in Taiwan. In 1951, Chiang had the homes of Xue and Bai Chongxi searched for evidence of collusion with Li Zongren and Zhang Fakui. Xue served as a strategic adviser to the President, as a minister without portfolio in the Executive Yuan from 1958, and as chairman of the Planning Commission for the Recovery of the Mainland from 1966. He was promoted to general first class in 1965. In the 1980s, he proposed to President Chiang Ching-kuo that the commission be replaced by a body to promote peaceful reunification, and in 1986, he joined other party elders in staying away from consultations on ending martial law. He also helped to found the World Hakka Association and served as its chairman.

Xue spent his later years in Chiayi County. In 1992, his home county of Lechang invited him to a local festival. He did not attend because of his age, but he sent the county government an inscribed bronze mirror. In the mid-1990s, he was interviewed for the Taiwanese public television documentary series An Inch of Land, an Inch of Blood, about the war against Japan.

He died at Taipei Veterans General Hospital on 3 May 1998, aged 101, and was buried at the Wuzhi Mountain Military Cemetery in Xizhi, Taiwan.

== Assessment ==
Xue's wartime record has been praised by figures on both sides of the civil war. Zhang Zhizhong called him "a general of a hundred battles", and Bai Chongxi credited the victories at Changsha to his leadership. Claire Chennault described him as one of China's most resolute field commanders and reported that Japanese intelligence considered him China's ablest war-zone commander. According to China News Service, Mao Zedong urged caution against him before the invasion of Hainan. Some contemporaries were critical of him. A 1939 report to the Chinese Communist Party and a 1941 report by the Juntong described him as stubborn, vainglorious and impulsive, and Zhang Fakui called him rash and obstinate.

== Personal life ==
Xue married three times. His first wife was surnamed Zhu; his second, Fang Shaowen, his former secretary, died in 1947; and in 1950, he married Tan Xingshen, who died in 1994. He had nine children, including the architect Xue Zhaoxin.

== Honours ==
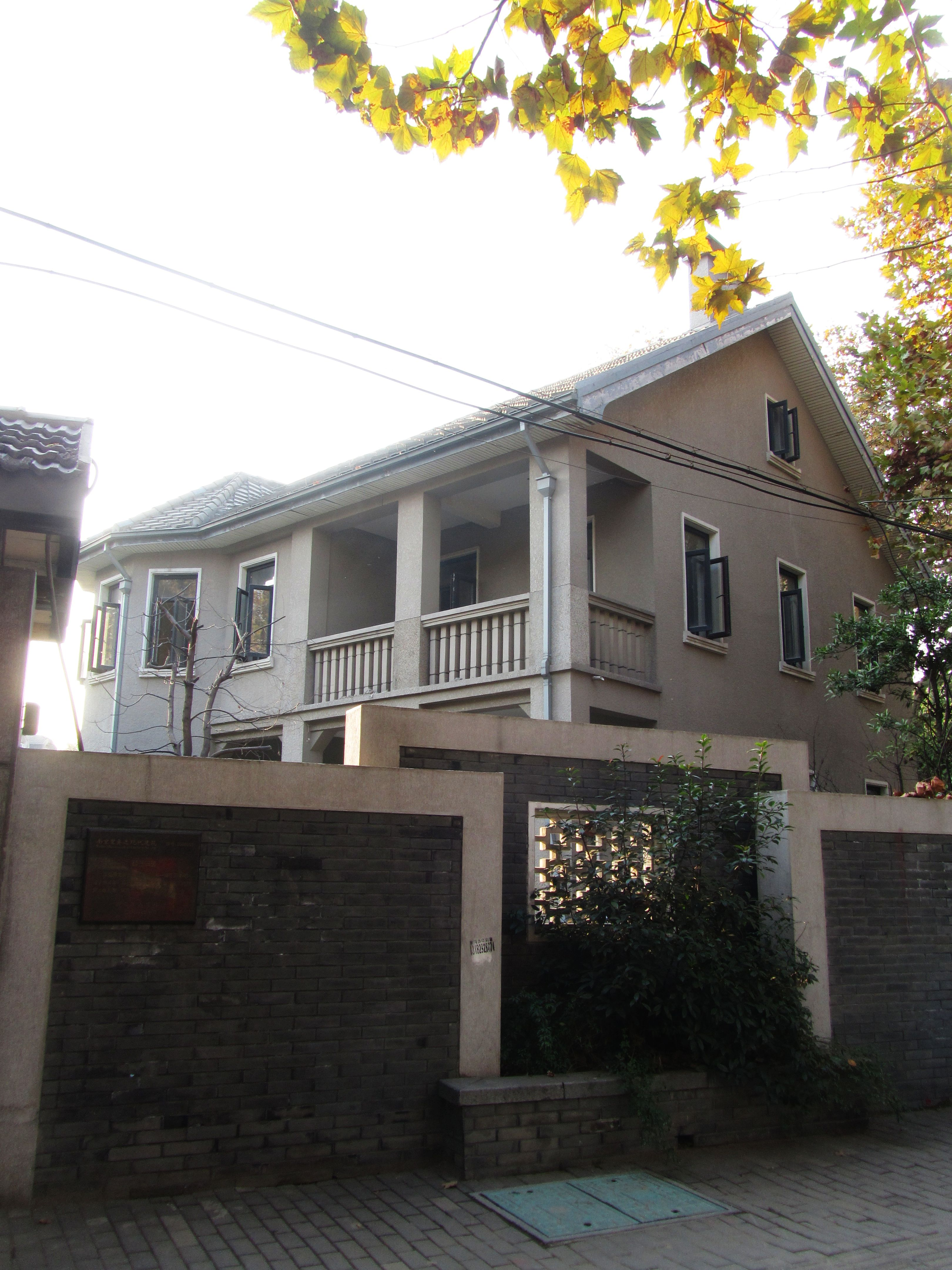
Former residence of Xue at Jiangsu Road in Nanjing, China

- Order of Blue Sky and White Sun (14 February 1942)
- First Class of the Order of the Sacred Tripod (February 1945)
- Second Class of the Order of the Sacred Tripod (Novembwer 1936)
- Third Class of the Order of the Sacred Tripod (1 January 1936)
- First Class of the Order of the Cloud and Banner (January 1948)
- First Class of the Order of Brilliant Star (1944)
- Order of Cosmic Diagram (1947)
- Order of Loyalty and Diligence (December 1945)
- Medal of the Armed Forces, A-1 (June 1937; again in 1949)
- Order of Victory of Resistance against Aggression (1946)
- Sun Yat-sen Medal (1985)
- War Memorial Medal (1946)
- Gancheng Badge First Class, Grade A (December 1940; again in 1949)
- Commemorative Medal for the 10th Anniversary of the Oath-Taking Ceremony of the Northern Expedition of the National Revolutionary Army (9 July 1936)
- Medal of Freedom with gold palm (United States) (10 October 1946)

Xue's former residence in Lechang, Bolingtang (伯陵堂), was restored in 2015 and is a protected heritage site of Guangdong province. His former residence at 23 Jiangsu Road in Nanjing is also recorded as a historic building.

== Works ==
Xue wrote accounts of several campaigns he directed, including Memoirs of the Eight-Year War of Resistance (抗战八年回忆记) and accounts of the battles of Lanfeng and Changsha.

Government offices
Preceded by Sun Xiwen	Chairman of the Guizhou Provincial Government; May 1937 – December 1937	Succeeded by Wu Dingchang
Preceded by Zhang Zhizhong	Chairman of the Hunan Provincial Government; January 1939 – June 1945	Succeeded by Wu Qihui
Preceded by Mou Zhongxing	Chairman of the Shandong Provincial Government; December 1944 – January 1945	Succeeded by He Siyuan
Preceded by Shang Zhen	Chief of Staff to the Military Affairs Commission of the Republic of China; May 1947 – May 1948	Succeeded by Office abolished
Preceded by T. V. Soong	Chairman of the Guangdong Provincial Government; January 1949 – October 1949	Succeeded by Office abolished
Preceded by Chen Cheng	Chairman of the Council for the Planning of the Recovery of the Mainland; May 1966 – June 1991	Succeeded by Office abolished
