= Junrokurō Matsuura =

- 松浦 淳六郎
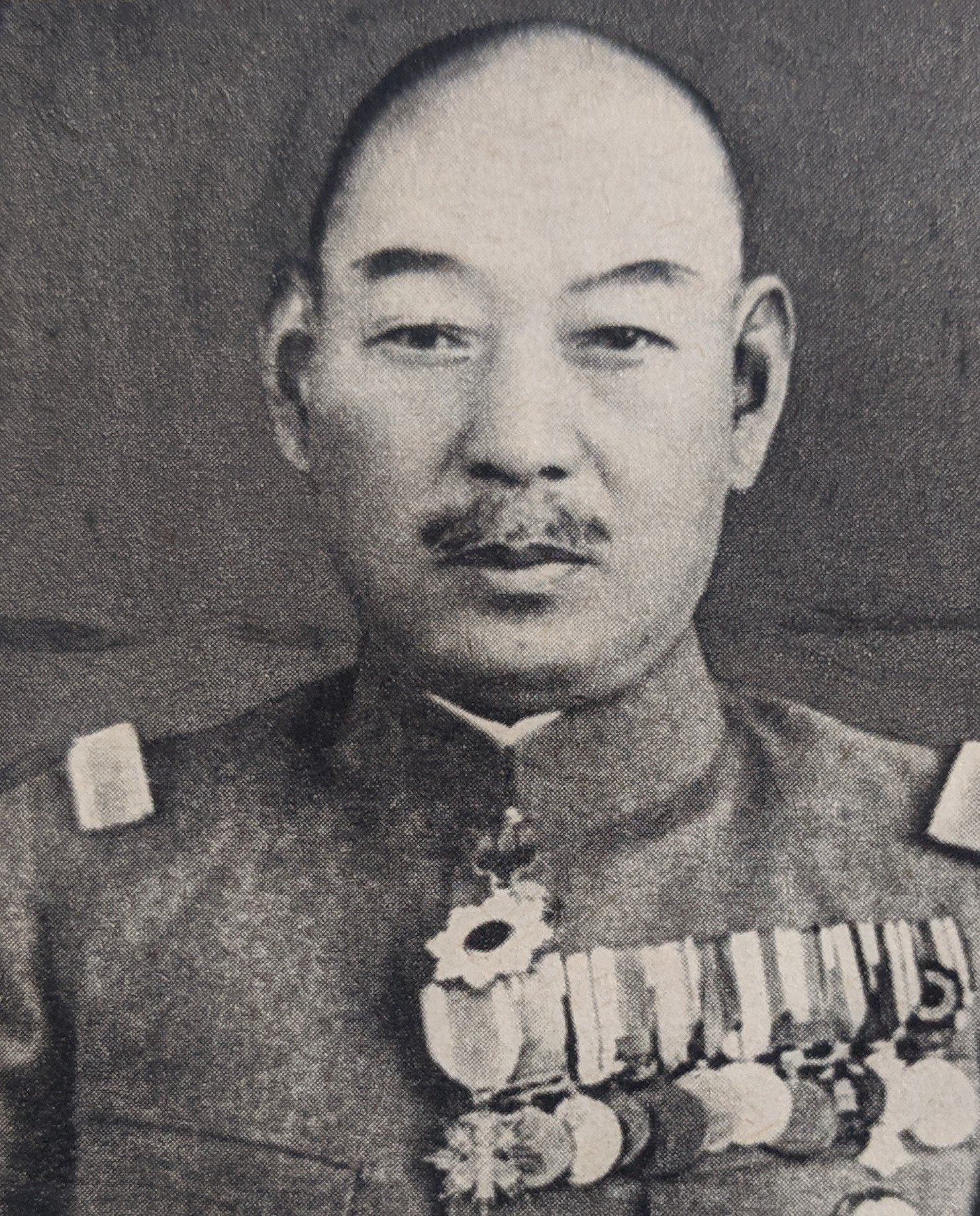
- Born: August 11, 1884; Fukuoka prefecture, Japan
- Died: February 12, 1944 (aged 59)
- Military career
- Allegiance: Empire of Japan
- Branch: Imperial Japanese Army
- Rank: Lieutenant General
- Commands: IJA 10th Division, IJA 106th Division
- Conflicts: Second Sino-Japanese War

Junrokurō Matsuura (松浦 淳六郎, Matsūra Junrokurō; 11 August 1884 – 12 February 1944) was lieutenant general in the Imperial Japanese Army in the Second Sino-Japanese War.

== Biography ==
A native of Fukuoka Prefecture, Matsuura graduated from the Imperial Japanese Army Academy in 1903. After graduation, he attended the Toyama Army Infantry School before entering the Army Staff College in 1912. From 1914–1916, he was attached to the Chosen Army.

Matsuura was attached to the General Affairs Section, 1st Bureau, of the Imperial Japanese Army General Staff from 1922 to 1924. Then he was then made Chief of General Affairs Section, 1st Bureau, and then sent to command IJA 13th Infantry Regiment from 1924 to 1926.

He then was made Chief of the General Affairs Section, of the Inspectorate General of Military Training until 1927. He was then made a Senior Adjutant, of the Ministry of War until 1932. From 1930 he was also the commander of the 12th Infantry Brigade of the 12th Division until 1932.

Matsuura was Head of the Personnel Bureau of the Ministry of War until 1935. Then Commandant of Toyama Army Infantry School in 1935, and that same year became the commander of IJA 10th Division until 1937 when he went into the reserves and retired.

In 1938, Matsuura was recalled to active service, and appointed the commanding officer of the IJA 106th Division in China during the Second Sino-Japanese War. His division was involved the Wuchang-Hankou Campaign especially the Battle of Wanjialing. He returned to Japan in early 1939 went into retirement.
