= Battle of Wanjialing =

1938 battle in China

- Part of the Battle of Wuhan in the Second Sino-Japanese War and the interwar period
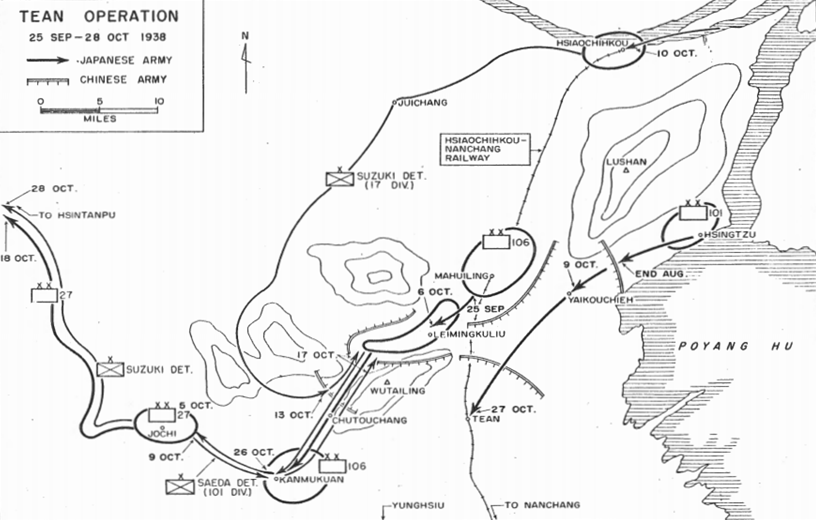
- Map outline of the battle
Date	10 August 1938 – 10 October 1938 (2 months)
Location	Wanjialing region in the Republic of China
Result	Chinese victory

Belligerents
China	Japan

Commanders and leaders
(Republic of China (1912–1949)) Xue Yue (Republic of China (1912–1949)) Wu Qiwei	(Empire of Japan) Junrokurō Matsuura

Strength
In the Wanjialing Front : 100,000 troops In the entire Nanchang-Jiujiang and Ruichang-Wuning Fronts : 245,777 troops in 31 infantry divisions from 12 armies, 1 separate brigade, and 2 Jiangxi peace preservation regiments	92,000 troops

Casualties and losses
In the battles along the Nanchang-Jiujiang, De'an-Xingzi, and Ruichang-Wuning Railways from 17 September until 4 October 1938 : 50,000+ combat casualties, including 15,000 in Wanjialing In the entire Nanchang-Jiujiang and Ruichang-Wuning Fronts from early August until mid-November 1938 (including 5,000+ combat casualties in the battle of De'an in late October 1938) : 38,067 killed 50,213 wounded 42,706 fallen ill	Initial Chinese claim : In the battles along the Nanchang-Jiujiang, De'an-Xingzi, and Ruichang-Wuning Railways from 17 September until 4 October 1938 : 20,000+ killed or wounded (including about 5,000 killed in Wanjialing), 110 captured Later Chinese claim : 30,000+ killed or captured (101st and 106th divisions, not including relief units (9th and 27th divisions) Japanese claim : 106th division (in the entire battle of Wuhan) : 3,321 killed 4,085 wounded 9,905 hospitalized from illnesses.

The Battle of Wanjialing, known in Chinese text as the Victory of Wanjialing (traditional Chinese: 萬家嶺大捷; simplified Chinese: 万家岭大捷; pinyin: Wànjiālǐng Dàjié), refers to the National Revolutionary Army's successful engagement during the Wuhan theatre of the Second Sino-Japanese War against the Japanese 101st, 106th, 9th and 27th divisions around the Wanjialing region in 1938. The two and a half month battle resulted in heavy losses of the Japanese 101st and 106th Divisions.

== Combatants ==
=== Chinese ===
The Chinese forces consisted of the 4th Army, the elite 74th Army, 66th Army, 187th Division, 91st Division, New 13th Division, 142nd Division, 60th Division, Reserved 6th Division, 19th Division, a brigade from the 139th Division and the New 15th Division, which totals up to 100,000 men. The chief commander in the frontline was the commander of the 9th Group Army Wu Qiwei. They were under the overall command of the supreme commander of the 9th Military Region Xue Yue.

=== Japanese ===
The Japanese forces consisted of the 106th Division, led by Lieutenant-General Junrokurō Matsuura. Under the 106th Division, there were the 111th Infantry Brigade (113th and 147th Infantry Regiments) and 136th Brigade (123rd and 145th Infantry Regiments), as well as regiments of cavalry, artillery, engineers and transport. During the battle, the 101st Division was also deployed. Later during the battle, the 9th and 27th divisions would also be deployed.

== Battle ==
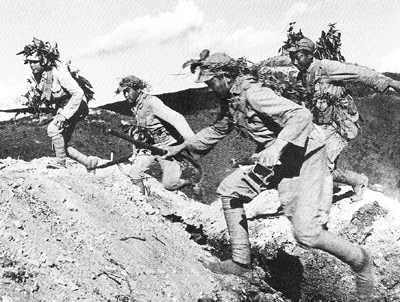
Chinese troops charging during the battle.

Under the orders of Yasuji Okamura, the Japanese 106th Division intended to cross the Wanjialing (萬家嶺) Region, hoping to cut through to the rear of De'an (德安) as a direct approach from Jiujiang (九江) along the railway line south and an approach by 101st Division by pushing through from the eastern foothills of Mount Lu was getting nowhere. The plan was discovered by Xue Yue, and the Chinese Army managed to surround the 106th Division with 16 divisions at Lushan. After capturing Jiujiang, the 106th Division tried to push south using the Jiujiang to Nanchang railway as the axis and capture De'an. It got a mauling at Shahe 沙河 just south of Jiujiang. On August 21, the Japanese 101st Division's Sato Detachment (commanded by Major General Sato Shozaburo (佐藤正三郎), 101 Brigade), consisting of two infantry battalions supported by a battalion of artillery, captured Xingzi as part of the push to De'an, but faced fierce resistance from Wang Jingjiu's 25th Corps and Ye Zhao's 66th Corps. Although reinforced with Saeda's detachment (commanded by Major General Saeda Yoshishige (佐村義重), 101st division) both forces were still unable to break through the Chinese lines. The Japanese proceeded to unleash poison gas on the Chinese positions. Although the Chinese had a severe shortage of protective equipment against chemical weapons, they were still able to repel the Japanese attack.

At the beginning of September, Okamura ordered the 9th and 27th Divisions to relieve the 106th division, but they were halted by fierce Chinese resistance. On September 24, the Japanese Army finally managed to punch through the Chinese lines in the west, but was then confronted by Ou Zhen's 4th Corps and Yu Jishi's elite 74th Corps and was once again surrounded. Desperate to break open a safe path for their trapped ground forces, the Japanese conducted heavy aerial bombardment on the Chinese positions with incendiary bombs, resulting in many Chinese deaths.

On October 7, the Chinese suddenly launched co-ordinated series of fierce counter-attacks, forcing the remaining Japanese units that were still intact to hastily retreat. Combat ended on October 10, which was coincidentally the Chinese National Celebration Day. On October 13, the Chinese forces withdrew from the battlefield.

== Aftermath ==
The two and a half month battle caused tremendous casualties for the Japanese army, especially their 101st and 106th divisions. These two divisions, which initially had a combined strength of over 47,000 troops, lost about 30,000 men in battle. The Japanese officer corps was hit particularly hard: the high casualty rate forced General Shunroku Hata to frequently airdrop replacement officers onto the bases of his besieged units throughout the battle.

For the Chinese, the successful defense of Wanjialing played a key role in the overall Wuhan campaign, halting the Japanese offensive drive towards Wuhan along the southern bank of the Yangtze River, and buying invaluable time for the Chinese government to evacuate its civilian population, war facilities, and industrial assets from the city and move them westward towards cities such as the new wartime capital of Chongqing.

== Sources ==
- Archives reveal China's key victory against Japanese aggressors
- (in Chinese) Battle of Wuhan: Smash the Japanese Ambition!
- (in Chinese) 打破日军不可战胜神话：万家岭大捷血战16昼夜(1)
