= Battle of Wuhan =

Battle in the Second Sino-Japanese War

Coordinates: 30.5667°N 114.2670°E

- Part of the Second Sino-Japanese War and the interwar period
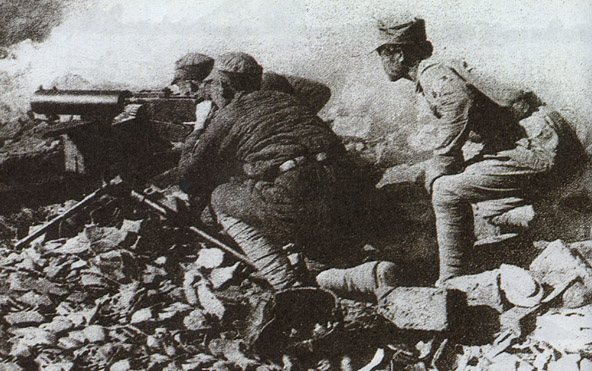
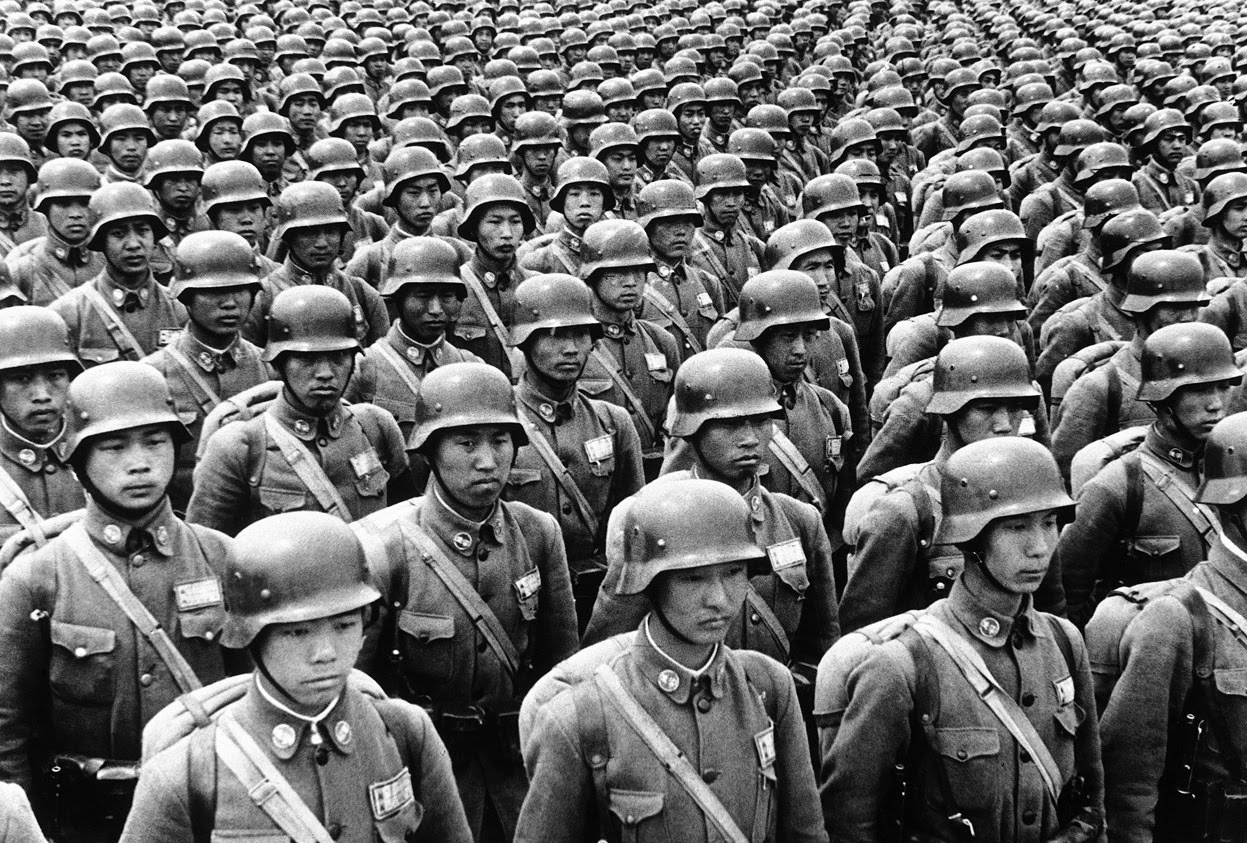
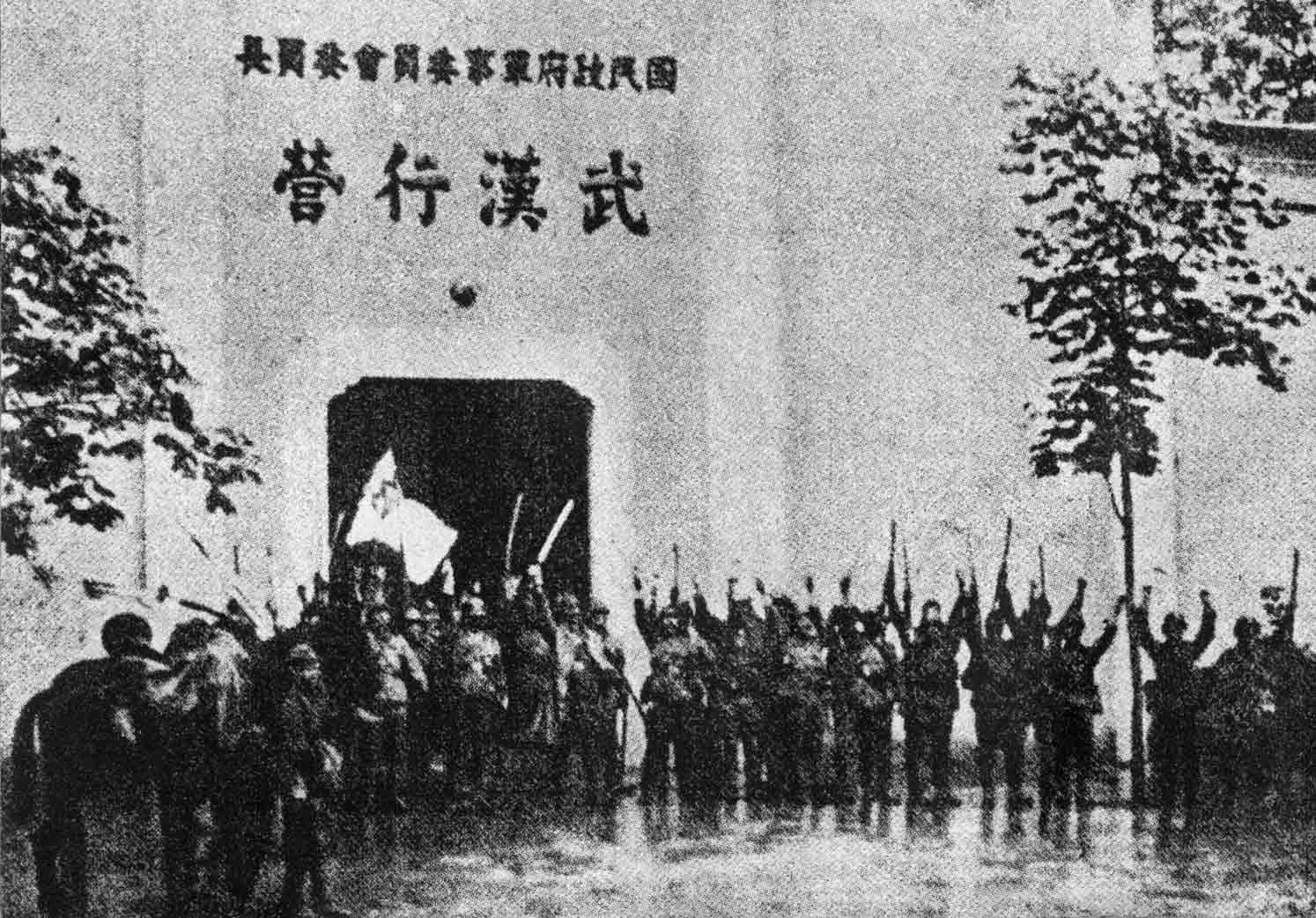
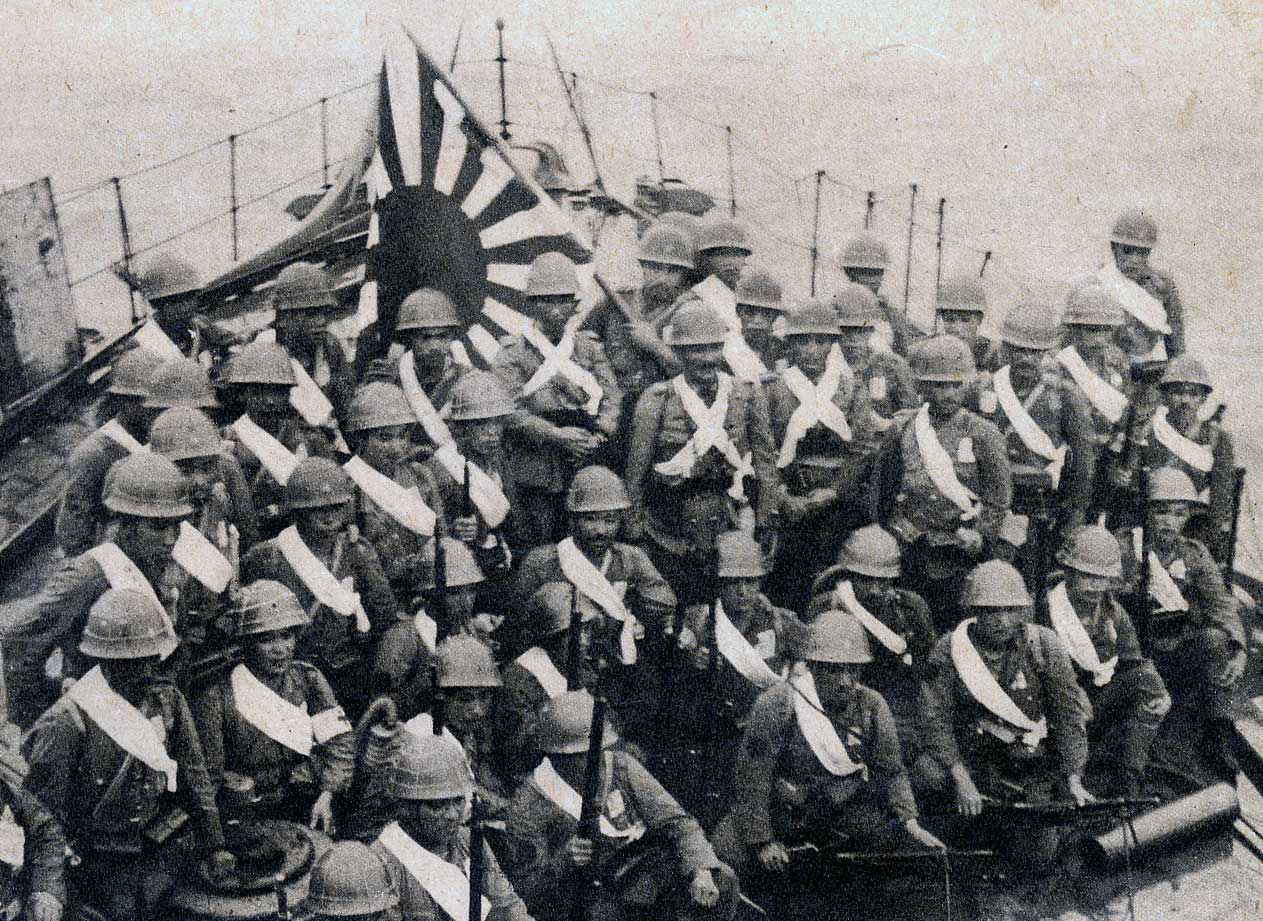
- Clockwise: Chinese machine gun position at Wanjialing; German-equipped divisions marching to Wuhan; Japanese SNLF on board to Anqing; Japanese celebrating the capture of the city
Date	11 June – 27 October 1938 (4 months, 2 weeks, and 2 days)
Location	Wuhan city and surrounding provinces (Anhui, Henan, Jiangxi, Hubei) in the Republic of China
Result	Japanese victory
Territorial changes	Capture of Wuhan by Japanese forces after Chinese withdrawal

Belligerents
(Republic of China (1912–1949)) China	(Empire of Japan) Japan

Commanders and leaders
(Republic of China (1912–1949)) Chiang Kai-shek; (Republic of China (1912–1949)) Chen Cheng; (Republic of China (1912–1949)) Bai Chongxi; (Republic of China (1912–1949)) Xue Yue; (Republic of China (1912–1949)) Wu Qiwei; (Republic of China (1912–1949)) Zhang Fakui; (Republic of China (1912–1949)) Wang Jingjiu; (Republic of China (1912–1949)) Ou Zhen; (Republic of China (1912–1949)) Zhang Zizhong; (Republic of China (1912–1949)) Li Zongren	(Empire of Japan) Prince Kan'in; (Empire of Japan) Yasuji Okamura; (Empire of Japan) Shunroku Hata; (Empire of Japan) Prince Higashikuni; (Empire of Japan) Shizuichi Tanaka; (Empire of Japan) Kesago Nakajima

Strength
Initially: 30 divisions (approx. 256,000); Later: 2,000,000 in the region (1,199,356 in about 122 divisions participating in the battle); 200 aircraft; 30 gunboats	350,000–403,200; 500+ aircraft; 120 warships and 315+ other naval vessels

Casualties and losses
Initial report: 254,628 killed or wounded (84,875 killed and 169,753 wounded); Postwar estimates: 400,000–500,000 killed, wounded, or missing	Japanese claim: 31,486–35,500 killed and wounded 105,945+ cases of illness Post-battle investigations by each army: 11th Army: 7,092 killed and 19,112 wounded 2nd Army: 2,505 killed and 7,427 wounded Chinese claim: Contemporary: 256,000 killed and wounded Academic: 200,000+ Zhang: 200,000+ killed and wounded 100 aircraft Dozens of vehicles destroyed 435+ naval vessels destroyed and damaged

Battle of Wuhan

Chinese name
- Traditional Chinese: 武漢會戰
- Simplified Chinese: 武汉会战
Transcriptions
Standard Mandarin
- Hanyu Pinyin: Wǔhàn Huìzhàn

Defense of Wuhan
- Traditional Chinese: 武漢保衛戰
- Simplified Chinese: 武汉保卫战
Transcriptions
Standard Mandarin
- Hanyu Pinyin: Wǔhàn Baǒwèizhàn

Japanese name
- Kanji: 武漢攻略戦
Transcriptions
- Romanization: Bukan koryakūsen

The Battle of Wuhan (traditional Chinese: 武漢會戰; simplified Chinese: 武汉会战; Japanese: 武漢作戦 (ぶかんさくせん)), popularly known to the Chinese as the Defense of Wuhan (traditional Chinese: 武漢保衛戰; simplified Chinese: 武汉保卫战), and to the Japanese as the Capture of Wuhan, was the largest, longest, and bloodiest battle of the Second Sino-Japanese War.

Engagements took place across vast areas of Anhui, Henan, Jiangxi, Zhejiang, and Hubei provinces over four and a half months. More than one million National Revolutionary Army troops from the Fifth and Ninth War Zones were put under the direct command of Chiang Kai-shek, defending Wuhan from the Central China Area Army of the Imperial Japanese Army led by Shunroku Hata. Chinese forces were supported by the Soviet Volunteer Group, volunteer pilots from the Soviet Air Forces.

The battle ended with the capture of Wuhan by Japanese forces. China took up to one million casualties, military and civilian. Japan, which suffered its heaviest losses of the war, diverted its attention north, prolonging the war until the attack on Pearl Harbor. The end of the battle began a strategic stalemate in the war, shifting from pitched to local battles.

== Background ==
After the Marco Polo Bridge Incident on 7 July 1937, the Imperial Japanese Army (IJA) launched a full-scale invasion of China. Both Beijing and Tianjin had fallen to the Japanese by 30 July, which exposed the rest of the North China Plain. To disrupt the Japanese invasion plans, the Chinese Nationalists decided to engage the Japanese in Shanghai, which opened a second front. The fighting lasted from 13 August to 12 November, with the Chinese suffering major casualties including "70 percent of Chiang Kai-shek's young officers." After the fall of Shanghai, Nanjing, which was the capital of China, was threatened directly by the Japanese forces. The Nationalists were thus forced to declare the capital an open city while they began the process of moving the capital to Chongqing.

With the fall of three major Chinese cities (Beijing, Tianjin, and Shanghai), there was a large number of refugees fleeing the fighting in addition to the government facilities and war supplies that needed to be transferred to Chongqing. Inadequacies in the transport systems prevented the government from being able to complete the transfer. Wuhan thus became the "de facto wartime capital" of the Republic of China for its strong industrial, economic, and cultural foundations. Assistance from the Soviet Union provided additional military and technical resources, including the Soviet Volunteer Group.

On the Japanese side, the IJA forces were drained by the large number and the extent of military operations since the beginning of the invasion. Reinforcements were thus dispatched to boost forces in the area, which placed a strain on the Japanese peacetime economy, leading Prime Minister Fumimaro Konoe to reassemble his Cabinet in 1938 and to introduce the National Mobilization Law on 5 May that year, which moved Japan into a wartime economic state.

=== Importance of Wuhan ===
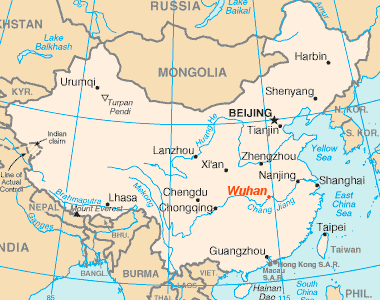
Location of Wuhan within China

Wuhan, located halfway upstream of the Yangtze River, was the second-largest city in China, with a population of 1.5 million in late 1938. The Yangtze River and the Hanshui River divide the city into three regions, which include Wuchang, Hankou and Hanyang. Wuchang was the political center, Hankou was the commercial district, and Hanyang was the industrial area. After the completion of the Yuehan Railway, the importance of Wuhan as a major transportation hub in the interior of China was further established. The city also served as an important transit point for foreign aid moving inland from the southern ports.

After the Japanese capture of Nanjing, the bulk of the Nationalist government agencies and the military command headquarters were in Wuhan although the capital had been moved to Chongqing. Wuhan thus became the de facto wartime capital at the onset of the engagements in Wuhan. The Chinese war effort was thus focused on protecting Wuhan from being occupied by the Japanese. The Japanese government and the headquarters of the China Expeditionary Army expected Wuhan to fall, along with the Chinese resistance, "within a month or two."

=== Preparations for battle ===
In December 1937, the Military Affairs Commission was created to determine the battle plan for the defense of Wuhan. After the loss of Xuzhou, approximately 1.1 million men or 120 divisions of the National Revolutionary Army were redeployed. The commission decided to organize the defense around the Dabie Mountains, Poyang Lake, and the Yangtze River against the 200,000 Japanese in 20 divisions of the Imperial Japanese Army. Generals Li Zongren and Bai Chongxi of the Fifth War Zone were assigned to defend the north of the Yangtze, and Chen Cheng of the Ninth War Zone was tasked with defending the south. The First War Zone, located in the west of the Zhengzhou-Xinyang section of the Pinghan Railway, was given the task of stopping the Japanese forces coming from the North China Plain. Finally, Chinese troops in the Third War Zone, located between Wuhu, Anqing and Nanchang, were given the task to protect the Yuehan Railway.

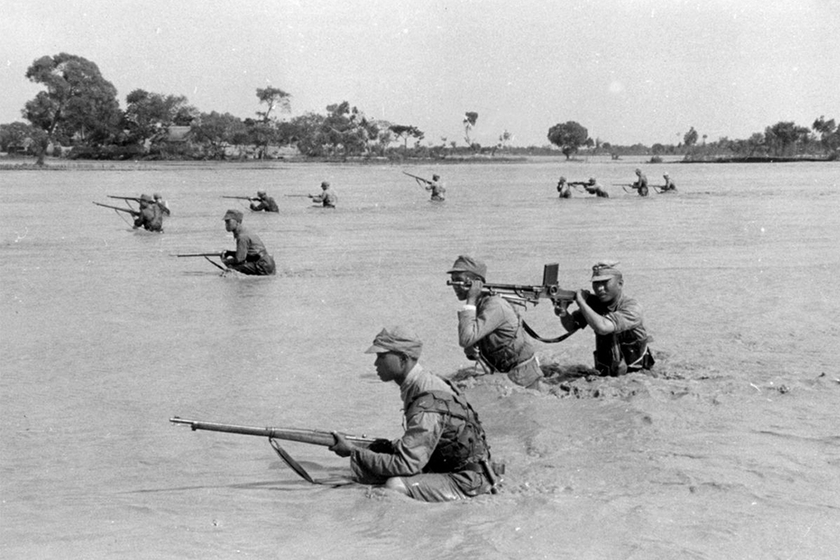
Chinese troops crossing the Yellow River in June 1938, the river was deliberately flooded by Chinese forces to buy time to defend Wuhan.

After the Japanese occupied Xuzhou in May 1938, they sought actively to expand the scale of the invasion. The IJA decided to send a vanguard to occupy Anqing for use as a forward base for an attack on Wuhan, for its main force then to attack the area north of the Dabie Mountains moving along the Huai River, and to occupy Wuhan eventually by the way of the Wusheng Pass. Later, another detachment would move west along the Yangtze. However, the Yellow River flood forced the IJA to abandon its plan of attacking along the Huai, and it decided to attack along both banks of the Yangtze instead. On 4 May, the commander of the IJA forces, Shunroku Hata, organized approximately 350,000 men of the Second and Eleventh Armies to fight in and around Wuhan. Under him, Yasuji Okamura commanded five-and-a-half divisions of the Eleventh Army along both banks of the Yangtze in the main assault on Wuhan, and Prince Naruhiko Higashikuni commanded four-and-a-half divisions of the Second Army along the northern foot of the Dabie Mountains to assist the assault. The forces were augmented by 120 ships of the Third Fleet of the Imperial Japanese Navy under Koshirō Oikawa, more than 500 planes of the Imperial Japanese Army Air Service, and five divisions of Japanese forces from the Central China Area Army to guard the areas in and around Shanghai, Beijing, Hangzhou, and other important cities, which would protect the back of the Japanese forces and complete the preparation for the battle.

== Prelude ==
The Battle of Wuhan was preceded by a Japanese air strike on 18 February 1938 that was known as the "2.18 Air Battle" and ended by Chinese forces repelling the attack. On 24 March, the Diet of Japan passed the National Mobilization Law, which authorized unlimited war funding. As part of the law, the National Service Draft Ordinance also allowed the conscription of civilians. On 29 April, the Japanese air force launched major air strikes on Wuhan to celebrate Emperor Shōwa's birthday. The Chinese, with prior intelligence, were well prepared. The battle was known as the "4.29 Air Battle" and was one of the most intense air battles of the Second Sino-Japanese War.

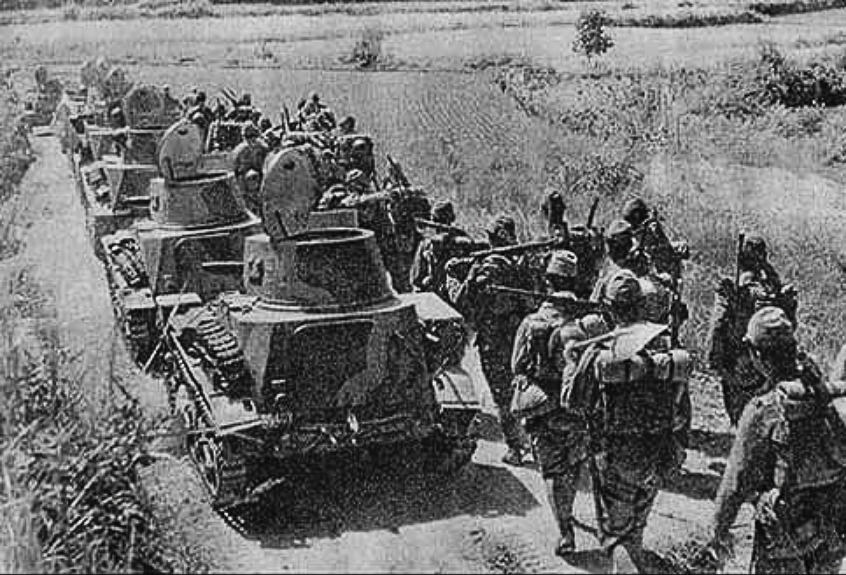
Japanese armored vehicles and pioneer troops approaching Wuhan

After the Battle of Xuzhou in May 1938, the Japanese planned an extensive invasion of Hankou and the takeover of Wuhan, and intended to destroy the main force of the National Revolutionary Army. The Chinese, on the other hand, were building up their defensive efforts by massing troops in the Wuhan area. They also set up a defensive line in Henan to delay the Japanese forces coming from Xuzhou. However, the disparity in Chinese and Japanese troop strength caused that line of defense to collapse quickly.

In an attempt to win more time for the preparation of the defense of Wuhan, the Chinese opened up the dikes of the Yellow River in Huayuankou, Zhengzhou on 9 June. The flood, now known as the 1938 Yellow River flood, forced the Japanese to delay their attack on Wuhan. However, it also caused around 500,000 to 900,000 civilian deaths by flooding many cities in northern China.

== Major engagements ==
=== Air war and preemptive strikes ===
On 18 February 1938, an Imperial Japanese Navy Air Service (IJNAS) strike-force composed of at least 11 A5M fighters of the 12th and 13th Kōkūtais, led by Lieutenant Takashi Kaneko, and 15 G3M bombers of the Kanoya Kokutai, led by Lieutenant Commander Sugahisa Tuneru, on a raid against Wuhan engaged in battle with 19 Chinese Air Force I-15 fighters of the 22nd and 23rd Pursuit Squadrons and 10 I-16 fighters of the 21st PS, all under the overall command of the 4th Pursuit Group CO Captain Li Guidan, as well as several more mix of Polikarpov fighters of the Soviet Volunteer Group. The 4th Group fighters would claim at least 4 of the A5Ms, and the Soviet group claimed no less than 3 of the A5Ms shot down. Both the Japanese fighter group commander, Lieutenant Kaneko, and the Chinese fighter group commander, Captain Li, were killed in action in the battle. A largely-intact A5M fighter plane that was downed in the battle was recovered with a damaged engine, and it was the second intact A5M to be recovered, repaired, and flight-tested in the war, the first recovered-intact A5M having been one downed by Colonel Gao Zhihang during an air battle over Nanjing on 12 October 1937.

On 3 August 1938, 52 Chinese fighters, with 20 I-15s, 13 I-16s, 11 Gloster Gladiators, and 7 Hawk IIIs intercepted at least 29 A5M fighters and 18 G3M bombers over Hankou. The former Guangxi warlord air force pilot Zhu Jiaxun and his squadron-mate, He Jermin, along with the Chinese-American fighter pilots Arthur Chin and Louie Yim-qun, all flying the Gladiators, would claim at least four of the A5Ms to be shot down that day.

=== Battles of Madang and Jiujiang ===
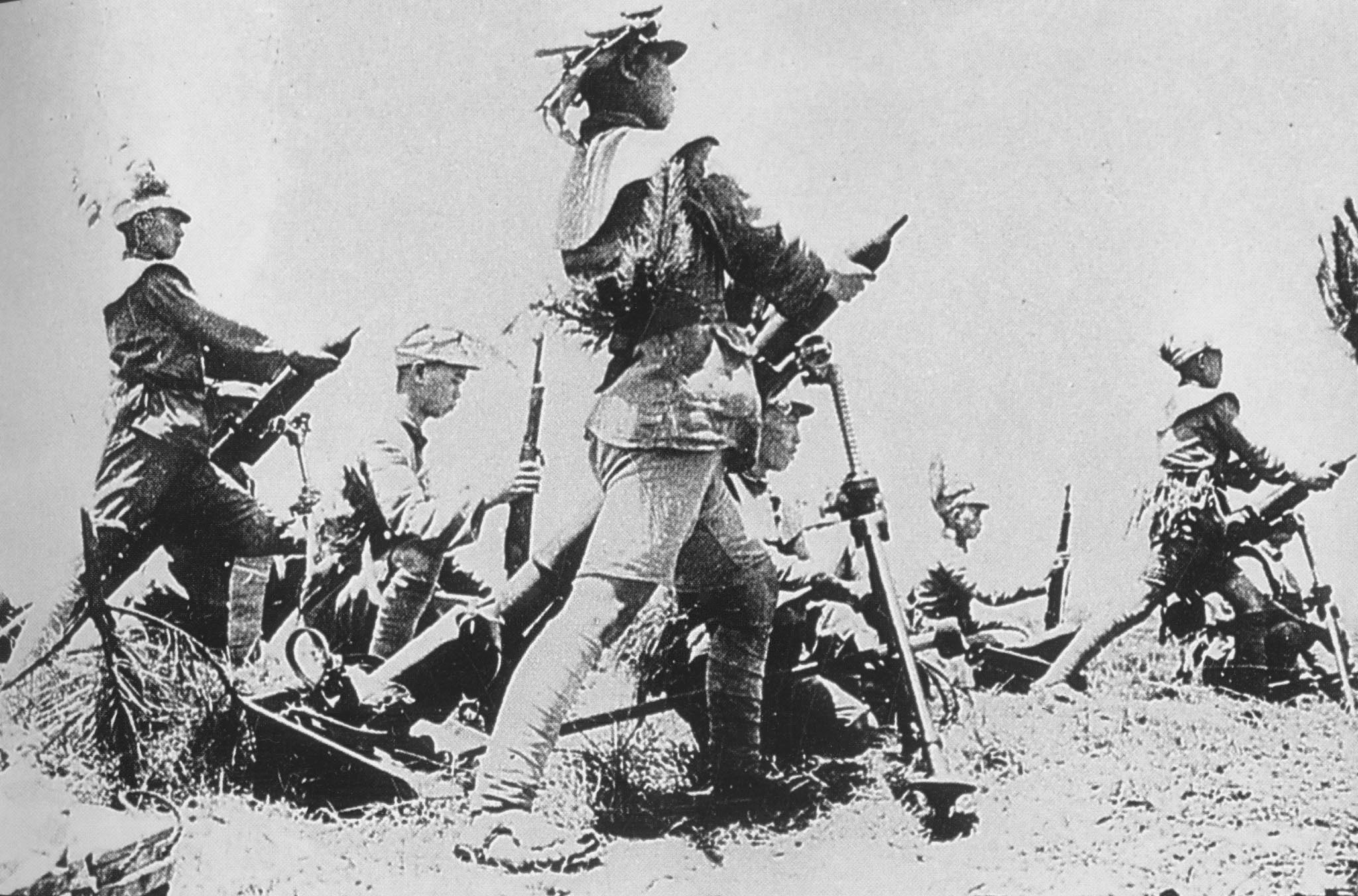
Chinese mortars in Xinyang

On 15 June, the Japanese made a naval landing and captured Anqing, which signaled the onset of the Battle of Wuhan. The capture Anqing's airbase enabled Japanese aircraft to assault Jiujiang, a major riverine port and railroad junction one hundred miles upstream.

On the southern bank of the Yangtze River, the Chinese Ninth War Zone had one regiment stationed west of Poyang Lake and another stationed in Jiujiang. To prevent a Japanese assault on Jiujiang, the Chinese had built defensive fortifications at Madang, including artillery emplacements, naval mines and bamboo river booms.

On 24 June, the Japanese forces made a surprise landing in Madang, while the main force of the Japanese Eleventh Army attacked along the southern shore of the Yangtze River. The Chinese garrison of the Madang river fortress repelled four Japanese assaults, but suffered casualties due to intense bombardment from Japanese ships on the Yangtze, as well as poison gas attacks. Due to a ceremony at a local military school by Li Yunheng (李韞珩), the overseeing general for the Madang defense, most of the Chinese officers responsible for Madang's defense were absent. Thus, only three battalions from the second and third marine corps and the 313th regiment of the 53rd division took part in its defense, totaling no more than 5 battalions. Moreover, when the 167th division stationed in Pengze was ordered by War Zone commander Bai Chongxi to march swiftly along the highway to reinforce the defenders, divisional commander Xue Weiying (薛蔚英) instead asked his direct superior commander Li Yunheng for instructions. Li Yunheng ordered Xue Weiying to take a harder-to-navigate path to avoid Japanese bombers. Reinforcements thus arrived too late, and Madang fell after a three-day battle. Chiang Kai-Shek immediately ordered a counterattack, offering a 50,000 yuan reward for the units responsible for the recapture of the fortress. On June 28, the 60th division of the 18th Corps and the 105th division of the 49th Corps successfully retook Xiangshan and were awarded 20,000 yuan, but could not make any further progress. Once the Japanese army attacked Pengze, the Chinese units turned to defense. Chiang Kai-Shek had Madang's overseeing general Li Yunheng court-martialed and divisional commander Xue Weiying executed.

The defeat at Madang opened up the route to Jiujiang. It took almost three weeks for the Japanese to clear the waterway around Madang of mines, costing them five minesweepers, two warships and a landing craft full of marines. After the fall of Madang, there were some two hundred thousand Chinese troops under the dual command of Xue Yue and Zhang Fakui in the Jiujiang-Ruichang area. The Japanese first captured the city of Pengze, but were met with resistance at Hukou, for which they deployed poison gas again in a five-day battle. During the break-out, there were not enough boats to evacuate the auxiliary soldiers of the defending 26th division from Hukou, and only more than 1,800 out of the more than 3,100 non-combat soldiers were taken in by the division. Most of the more than 1,300 missing soldiers drowned trying to cross the Poyang Lake.

The Japanese reached Jiujiang two weeks after the fall of Hukou. Chinese defenders tried to resist the Japanese advance, but were too disorganized and uncoordinated to repel the Japanese 106th Division. Jiujiang was captured on the 26th after a five-day battle. The decision to retreat by the Chinese forces came too suddenly for the civilian population to be evacuated, leaving many behind at the mercy of the Japanese occupiers.

Japan used chemical weapons to win after a Japanese army attack on 2 Chinese battalions was defeated at Ruichang, Jiangxi near Jiujiang on 22 August 1938.

Japanese used tear gas against Chinese positions on Moshan and Hungshan hills during fierce combat but were still defeated by Chinese after they tried the Japanese tried to advance from Ruichang to the southwst.

Near Jiujiang, at pagoda hill, a Japanese war journal seen by a western reporter admitted to severe Japanese losses on 29 July. The journal also admitted two thirds of each Japanese unit were ill and more than 100 Japanese were killed in the 8th Unit in fighting on 1 August. The reporter saw many captured Japanese journals, thousands stich belts, swords, gas masks, rifles and machine guns and testified that Japan was using chemical weapons.

=== Jiujiang Massacre ===
Following Jiujiang's capture, occupying Japanese forces engaged in a "mini-Nanjing Massacre" against the city's civilian population. Male civilians were indiscriminately executed alongside any POWs who had failed to retreat in time, whilst women and children were raped en masse. In addition, many of the city's urban districts and suburban villages were deliberately razed, including the city's ceramics factories and maritime transportation system.

As many as 90,000 civilians were massacred by the Japanese army in and around Jiujiang.

=== Southern Riverline Campaign ===
The Japanese Namita detachment moved westward along the river, landed northeast of Ruichang on 10 August, and mounted an assault on the city. The defending NRA 2nd Army Group was reinforced with the 32nd Group Army and initially halted the Japanese attack. However, when the Japanese 9th Division entered the fray, the Chinese defenders were exhausted, and Ruichang was captured on the 24th.

The Japanese 9th Division and the Namita detachment continued to move along the river, and the Japanese 27th Division invaded Ruoxi at the same time. The Chinese 30th Group Army and the 18th Army resisted along the Ruichang-Ruoxi Road and the surrounding area, which resulted in a stalemate for more than a month until the Japanese 27th Division captured Ruoxi on 5 October. The Japanese forces then turned to strike northeast, captured Xintanpu in Hubei on the 18th, and moved towards Dazhi.

In the meantime, other Japanese forces and their supporting river fleet continued their advance westwards along the Yangtze, encountering resistance from the defending Chinese 31st and 32nd Group Armies west of Ruichang. When the town of Madang and Fujin Mountain, both in Yangxin County, were captured, the Chinese 2nd Corps deployed the 6th, 54th, 75th and 98th Armies, along with the 26th and 30th Corps, to strengthen the defense of the Jiangxi region. The battle continued until 22 October when the Chinese lost other towns in Yangxin County, Dazhi and Hubei Provinces. The Japanese 9th Division and Namita detachment were now approaching Wuchang.

=== Wanjialing ===
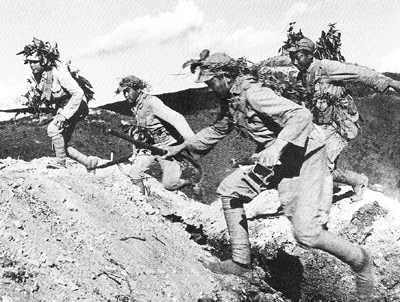
Advancing Chinese troops during the Battle of Wanjialing

While the Japanese Army attacked Ruichang, the 106th Division moved along the Nanxun Railway, now known as Nanchang-Jiujiang, on the south side. The defending Chinese 4th Army, 8th Army, and 29th Corps relied on the advantageous terrain of Lushan and north of Nanxun Railway to resist. As a result, the Japanese offensive suffered a setback. On 20 August, the Japanese 101st Division crossed Poyang Lake from Hukou County to reinforce the 106th Division, which breached the Chinese 25th Army's defensive line and captured Xinzhi. They attempted to occupy De'an County and Nanchang, together with the 106th Division, to protect the southern flank of the Japanese Army, which was advancing westward. Xue Yue, the commander-in-chief of the Chinese First Corps, used the 4th, 29th, 66th, and 74th Armies to link with the 25th Army and engaged the Japanese in a fierce battle at Madang and north of De'an, which brought the battle to a stalemate.

Towards the end of September, four regiments of the Japanese 106th Division circled into the Wanjialing region, west of De'an. Xue Yue commanded the Chinese 4th, 66th, and 74th Armies to flank the Japanese. The 27th Division of the Japanese Army attempted to reinforce the position but was ambushed and repulsed by the Chinese 32nd Army led by Shang Zhen in Baisui Street, west of Wanjialing. On 7 October, the Chinese Army mounted a final large-scale assault to encircle the Japanese troops. The battle continued for three days, and all of the Japanese counterattacks were repelled by the Chinese.

By 10 October, the Japanese 106th Division, as well as the 9th, 27th, and 101st Divisions, which had gone to reinforce it, had suffered heavy casualties. The Aoki, Ikeda, Kijima, and Tsuda Brigades were also destroyed in the encirclement. With Japanese forces in the area losing combat command capabilities, hundreds of officers were airdropped into the area. Of the four Japanese divisions which had gone into the battle, only around 1,500 men made it out of the encirclement. The event was later called the Victory of Wanjialing by the Chinese.

In 2000, Japanese military historians admitted the heavy damages that the 9th, 27th, 101st, and 106th Divisions and their subordinate units had suffered during the Battle of Wanjialing, increasing the number of martyrs of Japanese shrines; allegedly, the damages had not been admitted during the war to maintain public morale and confidence in the war effort.

=== North of the Yangtze ===
In Shandong, 1,000 soldiers under Shi Yousan, who had defected multiple times to rivaling warlord cliques and was then independent, occupied Jinan and held it for a few days. Guerrillas also briefly held Yantai. The area east of Changzhou all the way to Shanghai was controlled by another non-government Chinese force, led by Dai Li, who used guerrilla tactics in the suburbs of Shanghai and across the Huangpu River. The force was made up of secret society members of the Green Gang and the Tiandihui and killed spies and traitors. It lost more than 100 men during its operations. On 13 August, members of the force sneaked into the Japanese air base at Hongqiao and raised a Chinese flag.

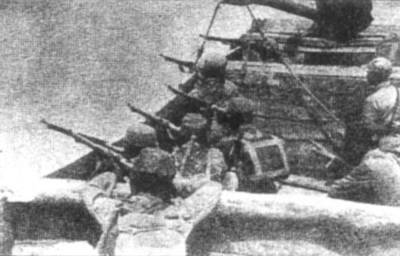
Chinese defenders around the Yangtze River during the Battle of Wuhan

While those factions were active, the Japanese 6th Division breached the defensive lines of Chinese 31st and 68th Armies on 24 July and captured Taihu, Susong, and Huangmei Counties on 3 August. As the Japanese continued to move westward, the Chinese 4th Army Group of the Fifth War Zone deployed its main force in Guangji, Hubei and Tianjia Town to intercept the Japanese offensive. The 11th Group Army and the 68th Army were ordered to form a line of defense in Huangmei county, and the 21st and 29th Group Armies, as well as the 26th Army, moved south to flank the Japanese.

The Chinese recaptured Taihu on 27 August and Susong on 28 August. However, with Japanese reinforcements arriving on 30 August, the Chinese 11th Group Army and the 68th Army were unsuccessful in their counteroffensives. They retreated to Guangji County to continue resisting the Japanese forces along with the Chinese 26th, 55th, and 86th Armies. The Chinese 4th Army Group ordered the 21st and 29th Group Armies to flank the Japanese from northeast of Huangmei, but they were unable to stop the Japanese advance. Guangji was captured on 6 September. On 8 September, Guangji was recovered by the Chinese 4th Army Group, but Wuxue was lost the same day.

Japan bombarded 500 Chinese with gas at Guangji County after 40 Japanese artillery pieces were captured and 1000 Japanese were killed in battle.

=== Battle of Tianjiazhen ===
The Japanese Army then lay siege to the river fortress of Tianjiazhen. Tianjiazhen was positioned at a natural choke point in the Yangtze river, with the banks being only 600m wide at its narrowest. To capitalize on this natural defense, the Chinese had built massive battlements and fortifications since the end of 1937, with help provided by Soviet advisors and thousands of local laborers.

Manning Tianjiazhen were thousands of China's best troops from the Central Army, including experienced veterans from the Battle of Shanghai. The army commanders and division commanders were all graduates from the Whampoa Military Academy.

The Japanese attacked Tianjiazhen primarily by land, but suffered from poor supply lines and attacks by Chinese guerrillas. The resulting struggle was one of the bloodiest of the entire Wuhan campaign, lasting for over a month until the Japanese finally captured it on September 29. To overcome the Chinese defenders, the Japanese resorted to deploying large amounts of poison gas, which proved to be their only decisive means of achieving victory.

Following the fall of Tianjizhen, the Japanese continued to attack westwards by capturing Huangpo on 24 October and rapidly approaching Hankou.

=== Dabie Mountains ===
In the north of the Dabie Mountains, the Chinese 3rd Army Group of the Fifth War Zone stationed the 77th Army of the 19th Corps and the 51st Army in the Liuan and Huoshan regions in Anqing. The 71st Army was tasked with the defense of Fujin Mountain and Gushi County in Henan. The Chinese 2nd Group Army was stationed in Shangcheng, Henan and Macheng, Hubei. The Chinese 59th Army of the 27th Corps was stationed in the Yellow River region, and the 17th Corps was deployed in the Xinyang region to organize the defensive works.

The Japanese attacked in late August with the 2nd Army marching from Hefei by two different routes. The 13th Division, on the southern route, breached the Chinese 77th Army's defensive line and captured Huoshan, when it turned towards Yejiaji. The nearby Chinese 71st Army and the 2nd Group Army made use of their existing positions to resist, which halted the Japanese 13th Division. The 16th Division was thus called in to reinforce the attack. On 16 September, the Japanese captured Shangcheng. The defenders retreated southwards out of the city and used their strategic strongholds in the Dabie Mountains to continue the resistance. On 24 October, the Japanese occupied Macheng.

The 10th Division was the main force in the northern route. It breached the Chinese 51st Army's defensive line and captured Liuan on 28 August. On 6 September, it captured Gushi and continued its advance westwards. The Chinese 59th Army of the 27th Corps gathered in the Yellow River region to resist. After ten days of fighting, the Japanese crossed the Yellow River on 19 September. On the 21st, the Japanese 10th Division defeated the Chinese 17th Corps and 45th Army and captured Lushan.

The 10th Division then continued to move westward but met a Chinese counterattack east of Xinyang and was forced to withdraw back to Lushan. The Japanese 2nd Army ordered the 3rd Division to assist the 10th Division in taking Xinyang. On 6 October, the 3rd Division circled back to Xintang and captured the Liulin station of Pinghan Railway. On the 12th, the Japanese 2nd Army captured Xinyang and moved south of the Pinghan Railway to attack Wuhan, together with the 11th Army.

Shangcheng County, Gushi County and Guangzhou (Guāng Prefecture) in Xinyang came under attack by the Japanese in southeast Henan.

The Chinese troops at the east gate of Guangzhou city walls were bombarded with 835 red gas grenades (chemical weapons) by the Japanese Second Brigade Number Two Gas Unit on 17 September, admitted in Example 52 of "Collected Examples of Chemical Warfare during the China incident" by Narashino military college in 1942.

On 27 September Guangzhou was attacked by the Japanese 3rd Division. Chinese troops of the 45th Army in Guangzhou who had no artillery fought to the end street by street in buildings, while walls and buildings were battered down and destroyed by Japanese artillery and aerial bombardment. Huangchuan city in Huangchuan County was also attacked until its walls and buildings were destroyed.

=== Guerrilla warfare in the Jiangsu-Zhejiang-Anhui border region ===
After the fall of Chao County, the Third War Zone conducted active guerrilla actions to support the Fifth and Ninth War Zones in the Battle of Wuhan. From June 23 to the end of December 1938, the Japanese 116th Division engaged in numerous battles with various units of the Third War Zone especially against the Sichuanese 23rd Group Army, claiming 8,501 abandoned enemy corpses and 161 POws while suffering 432 killed and 1,188 wounded. The 22nd Division lost 50 troops killed and 50 dead from wounds or diseases in the battle of Fuyang from September 22 to September 27. On August 23, an escort team of 13 troops of the 6th Company of the 51st Infantry Regiment of the 15th Division were all killed near Zhoujiacun.

=== Fighting in Guangzhou ===
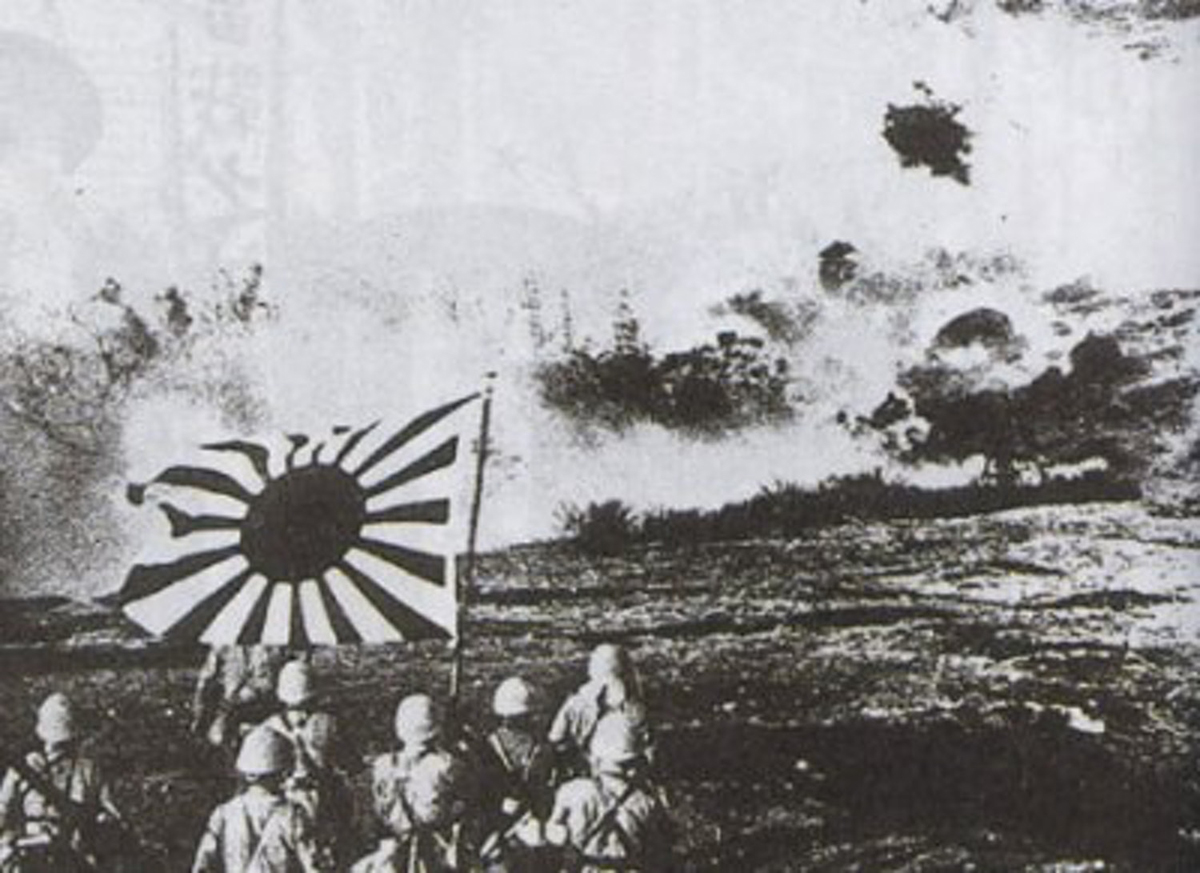
Japanese marine troops destroying a Chinese pillbox during the Canton Operation

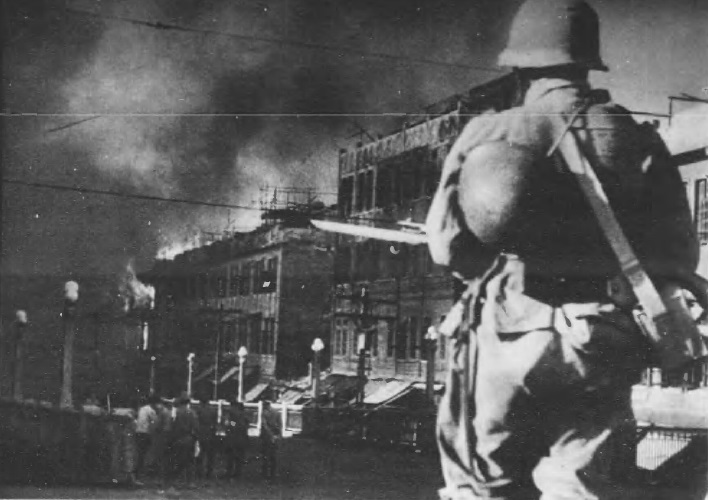
Hankou City on fire following the retreat of Chinese forces

The continuing stalemate around Wuhan and the continued influx of foreign aid to Chinese forces from ports in the south made the IJA decide to deploy three reserve divisions to pressure the naval shipping lines. It thus decided to occupy the Guangdong port by an amphibious landing. Because of the fighting in Wuhan, a significant portion of Chinese forces in Guangzhou had been transferred elsewhere. As such, the pace of the occupation was much smoother than expected, and Guangzhou fell to the Japanese on 21 October.

The loss of the Guangzhou area meant the loss of the main supply line of foreign aid to central China—the two railways linking Kowloon to Guangzhou and Guangzhou to Wuhan. Thus, the strategic value of Wuhan was greatly diminished. The Chinese Army, hoping to save its remaining forces, thus abandoned the city in October. The Japanese Army captured Wuchang and Hankou on 26 October and captured Hanyang on the 27th, which concluded the campaign in Wuhan.

== Use of chemical weapons ==
According to Yoshiaki Yoshimi and Seiya Matsuno, Emperor Shōwa authorized by specific orders (rinsanmei) the use of chemical weapons against the Chinese. During the Battle of Wuhan, Prince Kan'in Kotohito transmitted the emperor's orders to use toxic gas 375 times, from August to October 1938, despite the 1899 Hague Declaration IV, 2 - Declaration on the Use of Projectiles the Object of Which is the Diffusion of Asphyxiating or Deleterious Gases, Article 23 (a) of the 1907 Hague Convention IV - The Laws and Customs of War on Land, and Article 171 of the Versailles Peace Treaty. According to another memorandum discovered by the historian Yoshiaki Yoshimi, Prince Naruhiko Higashikuni authorized the use of poison gas against the Chinese on 16 August 1938. A resolution adopted by the League of Nations on 14 May condemned the use of toxic gas by the Imperial Japanese Army.

Japan made heavy use of chemical weapons against China to make up for its lack of numbers in combat and because China did not have any poison gas stockpiles of its own to retaliate. Japan used poison gas at Hankou in the Battle of Wuhan to break Chinese resistance after conventional Japanese assaults had been repelled by Chinese defenders. In the battle of Guangji, the Japanese Army's large-scale use of poison gas resulted in the Chinese Army suffering more than 2,000 casualties. Many of the affected troops were killed as Japanese troops with gas masks charged into their positions while they were incapacitated. In total, as many as 13,410 Chinese troops suffered from the effect of poison gas during the battle of Wuhan, including 4,342 who died. Rana Mitter wrote, "Under General Xue Yue, some 100,000 Chinese troops pushed back Japanese forces at Huangmei. At the fortress of Tianjiazhen, thousands of men fought until the end of September, with Japanese victory assured only with the use of poison gas. Yet even now, top Chinese generals seemed unable to work with each other at Xinyang, Li Zongren's Guangxi troops were battered to exhaustion. They expected that the troops of Hu Zongnan, another general close to Chiang Kai-shek, would relieve them, but instead Hu led his troops away from the city." Japan also used poison gas against Chinese Muslim armies at the Battle of Wuyuan and the Battle of West Suiyuan.

== Aftermath ==
In early November 1938, the Japanese Eleventh Army captured Yueyang and Tongshan. Of the Chinese units under Tang Enbo's command which attempted to resist the Japanese advance, the First Group Army was one of the units which did not perform well. The Yunnan Army, consisting of the experienced 60th Army and the newly-formed 58th Army and New Third Army, was ordered to occupy positions at the northeast of Chongyang by November 3. However, due to conflicts between the commanders, the inability of some officers to read maps, and the failure of the New 12th Division of the New Third Army to occupy its position in time, the Japanese was able to exploit a gap in the group army's defense line and attack the New 11th Division. Many officers of the 58th Army ignored orders to reinforce the frontline and assist the New 11th Division which was in danger of encirclement and instead retreated independently, causing the whole army to fall into chaos and retreat to Shichengwan, abandoning Chongyang and the fortifications they had built for several days. Meanwhile, the New Third Army did not see any combat and, after seeing that the Japanese had occupied the position of the New 11th Division, decided to retreat, ceased telegraph communication, and engaged in "guerrilla warfare" for several days before completely withdrawing from the battlefield to begin training in Liuyang. The Japanese continued pursuing the 58th Army, inflicting heavy casualties on the New 10th Division at Shichengwan and capturing Tongcheng on November 9.

The 58th Army suffered over 2,000 casualties and lost over 1,000 rifles in this battle. Public opinion turned against the First Group Army as the Yunnan troops lost hundreds of li of land and two major cities, which enraged Chiang Kai-shek. Sun Du, the commander of the 58th Army, was given a major demerit, Zhang Chong, the commander of the New Third Army, and Feng Yin, the acting commander of the New 11th Division after the original commander Lu Daoyuan had resigned before the battle, were dismissed and investigated, and the New 11th Division was disbanded. Long Yun and Lu Han pleaded on behalf of Zhang Chong while Sun Du also pleaded on behalf of Feng Yin and requested that the New 11th Division be retained. Chiang Kai-shek accepted their pleas, dropping the investigations and restoring the designation of the New 11th Division after the battle of Nanchang.

After four months of fighting, both the Chinese Air Force and the Chinese Navy were decimated since the IJA had captured Wuhan. However, the main Chinese land force remained largely intact, and the IJA was significantly weakened. The Battle of Wuhan bought more time for Chinese forces and equipment in Central China to move farther inland to the mountainous fortress of Chongqing and lay the foundation for an extended war of resistance. Wuhan and Hubei Province now provided the Japanese with new airbases and logistics to support the massive "joint-strike force" terror-bombing campaign against Chongqing and Chengdu under the codename Operation 100.

After its victory in the Battle of Wuhan, Japan advanced deep into Communist territory and redeployed 50,000 troops to the Shanxi-Chahar-Hebei Border Region. Elements of the Communist Eighth Route Army soon attacked the advancing Japanese, claiming to have inflicted between 3,000 and 5,000 casualties and caused a Japanese retreat while suffering more than 3,000 casualties. (Note: Known as the "Anti-Encirclement Campaign in the Shanxi-Chahar-Hebei Border Region" by the Eighth Route Army and as the "North Shanxi Operation" by the North China Area Army.) (Note: The 109th Division suffered 94 killed and 207 wounded in the North Shanxi Operation while claiming approximately 2,150 abandoned enemy corpses and 52 POWs against Nationalist and Communist troops from September 18 to October 31, 1938. On November 4, 5,000 troops from the 714th and 716th Regiments of the 358th Brigade of the 129th Division and the 4th Battalion of the 2nd Military Sub-District of the Shanxi-Chahar-Hebei Border Region attacked a battalion of the 109th Division at Wutai County, claiming to have killed or wounded more than 500 enemy troops and capturing 21 while suffering 24 killed and 85 wounded from November 3 to November 4. The 109th Division reported suffering approximately 200 killed or wounded in the ambush on November 4 while claiming to have wiped out an enemy force of approximately 500 troops and capturing 70 on November 3. On the other hand, according to the status report of the divisional commander after the division’s demobilization, the 109th Division suffered 60 killed and 142 wounded while claiming approximately 2,910 abandoned enemy corpses and 208 POWs in the whole Wuning Operation against Nationalist and Communist troops from November 1 to December 25, 1938.; The Eighth Route Army claimed to have killed or wounded more than 800 troops of the 26th Division from September 25 to October 1 while suffering more than 200 casualties and killed or wounded more than 1,150 troops of the 2nd Independent Mixed Brigade and collaborationist troops and capturing 4 Japanese troops in 5 major battles in October while suffering more than 559 casualties. The Mongolia Garrison Army in October suffered 7 killed and 25 wounded from the 26th Division and 19 killed and 56 wounded from the 2nd Independent Mixed Brigade while claiming 1,222 abandoned enemy corpses. The bloodiest day for the 2nd Independent Mixed Brigade on that month was on October 28 in the battles of Shaojiagou and Jiazhuang, where the mixed brigade claimed to have fought with a total of approximately 800 Communist Army troops and claimed 110 abandoned enemy corpses while suffering 16 killed and 51 wounded. In the ambushes of Zhangjiawan, Shaojiazhuang, and Jiazhuang that day, the Eighth Route Army invested the main force of the 358th Brigade of the 120th Division and a battalion of the 1st Military Sub-District of the Shanxi-Chahar-Hebei Border Region, claiming to have killed or wounded more than 500 troops of the 2nd Independent Mixed Brigade and reinforcements and capturing 4 while suffering more than 220 casualties. Of the other losses of the mixed brigade that month, 1 was killed fighting against Zhang Chengde’s Nationalist troops, 2 were killed and 3 were wounded fighting against Communist troops, and 1 was killed and 2 were wounded from mines.; The Eighth Route Army recorded one major battle against the 4th Independent Mixed Brigade during the Anti-Encirclement Campaign, claiming to have killed Major General Kiyo Shimizu and killed or wounded more than 400 other Japanese troops in the battles of Bailanzhen and Shifosi from September 29 to October 1 while suffering 209 casualties. The 4th Independent Mixed Brigade reported the Shimizu task force suffering 2 wounded in the battles near Bailanzhen and Shifosi on September 29 and September 30 while claiming 80 abandoned enemy corpses and 6 killed including task force commander Shimizu and 25 wounded in the battle near Shifosi on October 1 while claiming "many" abandoned enemy corpses.; The Eighth Route Army claimed to have killed or wounded more than 2,000 troops of the 110th Division and reinforcements and captured 2 from late September to late October 1938 as part of the Anti-Encirclement Campaign. The reported casualties of the 110th Division in this operation was unknown, but from August 1938 to October 1939, the division was reported to have fought against Nationalist and Communist guerillas in approximately 2,250 battles (an average of 5 per day) and claimed approximately 36,260 abandoned enemy corpses while losing 533 troops killed in action.) (Note: In the North Shanxi Operation, the Japanese Army was facing not only the Communist Eighth Route Army but also Nationalist troops aligned to Yan Xishan such as Jin Xianzhang’s New 2nd Division, Yan Yufeng’s 1st district and Guo Rusong’s 2nd district of the Shanxi Peace Preservation Force, and three regiments of Zhao Chengshou’s 1st Cavalry Army, all of which, with the exception of the 1st Cavalry Army in guerilla operations, the Japanese Army claimed to have inflicted heavy casualties including the death of commander Yan Yufeng and the dissolution of the 1st district peace preservation force. In the battle of Dingxiang against the aforementioned Nationalist troops on October 1 alone, the 109th Division suffered 4 killed and 51 wounded.) Units of the Chinese Ninth and Fifth War Zones also began conducting guerilla actions against the 11th Army after the Japanese capture of Wuhan. From December 1938 to February 1940, excluding major battles such as Battle of Nanchang (Note: The Japanese Army did not consider the Chinese counteroffensive towards Nanchang from late April to the middle of May 1939 to be part of the "Assault on Nanchang" and instead included it as part of the "other operations".), Battle of Suixian-Zaoyang, Battle of Changsha (1939), and 1939–1940 Winter Offensive, the 11th Army recorded engaging in 3,235 battles against 685,900 enemy troops, claiming 63,800 abandoned enemy corpses and 3,792 POWs while suffering 1,864 killed and 5,692 wounded in what was termed as "other operations and mopping-up battles".

The IJA advance in central China was slowed down significantly by multiple battles around Changsha in 1939, 1941, and 1942. No more major offensives were launched until Operation Ichi-Go in 1944; between 1942 and 1944, limited Japanese offensives were mounted for the sole purpose of training recruits. The Chinese managed to preserve their strength to continue resisting the weakened IJA, which reduced its capability to respond to rising tensions between Japan and the Soviet Union at the northeastern borders.

== See also ==
- Air warfare of the Second Sino-Japanese War
