= Ou Zhen =

Chinese general (1899–1969)

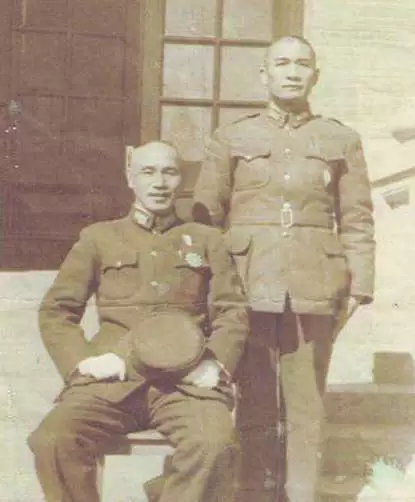
- Chiang Kai-Shek with Ou Zhen, on the right
- Native name: 歐震
- Born: 3 January 1899; Qujiang, Guangdong, Qing dynasty
- Died: 13 February 1969 (aged 70) Taipei, Taiwan
- Allegiance: Republic of China
- Branch: (Republic of China (1912–1949)) National Revolutionary Army
- Rank: General
- Conflicts: Second Sino-Japanese War; Battle of Shanghai; Battle of Wuhan; Battle of Wanjialing; Battle of Changsha (1939); 1939–1940 Winter Offensive; Battle of Changsha (1941); Battle of Changsha (1941–1942); Battle of Changde

Ou Zhen (Chinese: 歐震, 3 January 1899 – 13 February 1969), or Ou Chen, was a Kuomintang army general from Qujiang, Guangdong.

He was active in the Second Sino-Japanese War during World War II. He was a commander in the Battle of Shanghai, the Battle of Wuhan (leading the 4th Corps, particularly in the Battle of Wanjialing), the 1st Changsha Campaign, the 1939-40 Winter Offensive, as well as the 2nd and 3rd Changsha Campaigns. He commanded Army Ou Chen in the Changde Campaign, and the Changsha-Hengyang Campaign of 1944. He again commanded 4th Corps in the Hunan-Guangdong-Jiangxi Border Areas Operation in early 1945.

After the Communists gained control of mainland China, he fled to Taiwan in 1949. He died in Taipei, and was promoted to general posthumously.

== Military positions ==
- 1937 General Officer Commanding 90th Division
- 1938–1944 General Officer Commanding IV Corps
- 1944 General Officer Commanding Army Ou Chen
- 1945 General Officer Commanding IV Corps
- 1945 General Officer Commanding 99th Division
