= Battle of Nanchang order of battle =

The order of battle for the Nanchang Campaign (Mid Feb. – Early May 1939)

== Japan ==
11th Army - Gen. Yasuji Okamura [1,2]

- 6th Division - Lt. Gen. Shiro Inaba [4]
  - 9th Infantry Brigade
    - 11th Infantry Regiment
    - 41st Infantry Regiment
  - 21st Infantry Brigade
    - 21st Infantry Regiment
    - 42nd Infantry Regiment
  - 5th Mountain Artillery Regiment
  - 5th Cavalry Regiment
  - 5th Engineer Regiment
  - 5th Transport Regiment
- 101st Division - Lt. Gen Masatoshi Saito [4]
  - 101st Infantry Brigade
    - 101st Infantry Regiment
    - 149th Infantry Regiment
  - 102nd Infantry Brigade
    - 103rd Infantry Regiment
    - 157th Infantry Regiment
  - 101st Field Artillery Regiment
  - 101st Cavalry Regiment
  - 101st Engineer Regiment
  - 101st Transport Regiment
- 106th Division * - Lt. Gen. Atsuo Matsuura [4]
  - 111th Infantry Brigade
    - 113th Infantry Regiment
    - 147th Infantry Regiment
  - 136th Infantry Brigade
    - 125th Infantry Regiment
    - 145th Infantry Regiment
  - 106th Field Artillery Regiment
  - 106th Cavalry Regiment
  - 106th Engineer Regiment
  - 106th Transport Regiment
- Ishii Tank Task Force - Col. Ishii [5]
  - 5th Tank Battalion - Colonel Ishii
  - 7th Tank Regiment - Lieut. Colonel Kusunose
  - 9th Independent Tankette Company - Captain Yamada
    - [All the armored units together comprised 76 Type 89 medium tanks and 59 Type 94 tankettes]
  - 2nd Battalion of 147th Infantry Regiment /106th Div. [6]
  - 1st Company of 3rd Independent Engineer Regiment[6]
  - 1 Platoon of 8th Divisional Transport Unit[6]
- 120th Cavalry Regiment - Seinji Hasekawa[1]
- 22nd Artillery Regt. - Houkichi Nakahira[1]
- 6th Field Heavy Artillery Brigade HQ - Major Gen. Sumita[3]
  - 13th Field Heavy Artillery Regiment [15 cm howitzers] Lt. Col. Okoshi[3]
  - 14th Field Heavy Artillery Regiment [15 cm howitzers] Lt. Col. Maruyama[3]
  - 10th Field Heavy Artillery Regiment [15 cm howitzers] Lt. Col. Nagaya[3]
  - 15th Independent Field Heavy Artillery Regiment [10 cm cannons] Col. Horikawa[3]
- 101st Field Artillery Regiment [75mm field guns] Lt. Col. Yamada[3]
- 3rd Independent Mountain Gun Regiment [75mm mountain guns] Lt. Col. Morikawa[3]
- 106th Field Artillery Regiment [75mm field guns] Lt. Col. Uga[3]
- 2nd Battalion/2nd Independent Mountain Gun Regiment [75mm mountain guns] Major Matsumoto[3]

Naval: T Operation Fleet - Rear Admiral Keijiro Goga [6]

- Main unit
  - 1st Base Force
  - Asuka
- Advanced unit
  - Hira
  - Futami
- Rear Guard
  - Kotaka
  - 2nd Gunboat Unit
  - 3rd Gunboat Unit
- Advanced Guard
  - 1st Minesweeper Unit and other small craftIncluding the Sumiyoshi Maru and the Hayase
  - Kure 5th SNLF
  - 4th Gunboat Unit

Naval Airforce:

- Air Unit [6,7]
  - River Plane Unit of 1st Base Force
    - aircraft ?
  - 12th Air Unit Kōkūtai
    - Fighter daitai - ? Mitsubishi A5M
    - Bomber daitai - ? Yokosuka B3Y1

Army Airforce: 3rd Flight Group - Major Gen. Sugawara [6,7]

- Independent 17th Flying Squadron [17th Dokuritsu Hiko Chutai] - cdr ?, base: Central China
  - ? Aircraft type, Reconnaissance squadron
- 45th Flying Sentai - cdr ?, base: Central China
  - ? Aircraft type, Light bomber unit
- 75th Flying Sentai - cdr ?, base: Central China
  - ? Aircraft type, Light bomber unit
- 77th Flying Sentai - cdr ?, base: Wuchang
  - ? Kawasaki Ki-10 Fighter

Notes:

- 9th Division in Yueh-Linhsiang area. [1]
- 3rd, 13th, 116th Divisions North of Yangtze River vs. Chinese 5th War Area forces. [1]
- Only a portion of the 106th Division took part. [1]
- T Operation Fleet had over 30 ships and 50 motor boats and one battalion of Marines [1]

== China ==
9th War Area - Chen Cheng [1]

- 19th Army Group - Lo Cho-ying
  - 79th Corps - Hsia Chu-chung
    - 118th Division - Wang Ling-yun
    - 76th Division - Wang Ling-yun
    - 98th Division - Wang Chia-pen
  - 49th Corps - Liu Tuo-chuan
    - 105th Division - Wang Tieh-han
    - 9th Res. Division - Chang Yen-chuan
  - 70th Corps - Li Chueh
    - 19th Division - Li Chueh (concurrent)
    - 107th Division - Tuan Heng
  - 32nd Corps - Sung Ken-tang
    - 139th Division - Li Chao-ying
    - 141st Division - Tang Yung-liang
    - 142nd Division - Fu Li-ping
  - 5th Res Division - Tseng Chia-chu
  - Poyang Lake Garrison - Tseng Chia-chu
    - 3 Regts of Kiangsi Peace Preservation Force
  - Lu Shan Guerrilla Command - Yang Yu-chen
    - 2 Peace Preservation Regts
- 74th Corps - Yu Chi-shih
  - 51st Division - Wang Yao-wu
  - 58th Division - Feng Sheng-fa
  - 60th Division - Chen Pei
- Hunan - Hupei - Kiangsi Border Area Guerrilla Command - Fan Sung-pu
  - 8th Corps - Li Yu-tang
    - 3rd Division - Chao Hsi-tien
    - 197th Division - Ting Ping-chuan
  - 73rd Corps - Peng Wei-jen
    - 15th Division - Wang Chih-pin
    - 77th Division - Liu Chu-ming
  - 128th Division - Wang Ching-tsai
  - 1st Guerrilla Command - Kung Ho-chung
    - 4 columns
- 1st Army Group - Lung Yun, Dep. Cdr. - Lu Han
  - 58th Corps - Sun Tu
    - New 10th Division - Liiu Cheng-fu
    - 183rd Division - Yang Hung-kuang
  - 3rd Corps - Chang Chung
    - 184th Division - Chang Chung (concurrent)
    - New 12th Division - Kung Hsun-pi
  - 60th Corps - An En-pu
    - 182nd Division - An En-pu (concurrent)
    - New 11th Division - Kung Hsun-pi
- 30th Army Group - Wang Ling-chi
  - 78th Corps - Hsia Shou-hsun
    - New 13th Division - Liu Cheng-fu
    - One Brigade of the New 16th Division - (command?)
  - 72nd Corps - Han Hsien-pu
    - New 14th Division - Fan Nan-hsuan
    - New 15th Division - Teng Kuo-cheng

== From 3rd War Area ==
7 Divisions of 32nd Army Group were mentioned in the text [1] as being in the counterattack to recapture Nanchang:

32nd Army Group - Shangkuan Yun-hsiang

- 29th Corps - Chen An-Pao
  - 26th Division - Liu Yu-ching
  - (other divisions?)
- 25th Corps - Wang Ching-chiu
  - 79th Division ?
  - 5th Reserve Division ?
- 28th Corps - ?
  - 16th Division
- 91st Corps - ?
  - 10th Reserve Division
- 102nd Division - ?

Notes:

32nd Army Group divisions mentioned[1]:

- Attacking from area between Kan and Fu River
  - 16th Division/28th Corps - ?
  - 10th Reserve Division/91st Corps - ?
- Attacking from Fu River between Wu-yang-tu and Hsieh-fu-shih
  - 79th Division - ?
  - 5th Reserve Division - ?
- In reserve across the Fu River, later made final attack on Nanchang
  - 67th Division - Mo Yu-shuo

Early reinforcement from 3rd War area, presumably part of 32nd Army Group

- 102nd Division - ?

On May 5, 1939, Chinese recovered Nanchang Train Station & Nanchang Airport, and fought bayonet wars with Japanese at city walls. 29th Corps Chief Chen An'bao sacrificed his life during the battle, and division chief Liu Yuqing was injured.
