= 106th Division (Imperial Japanese Army) =

- Active: 1938–1940
- Country: Empire of Japan
- Branch: Imperial Japanese Army
- Type: Infantry
- Size: 22,000
- Garrison/HQ: Kumamoto
- Nickname(s): deliberately none
- Engagements: Battle of Wuhan; Battle of Wanjialing; Battle of Nanchang; Battle of Xiushui River; Battle of Changsha (1939); 1939-40 Winter Offensive

Commanders
- Notable commanders: Matsuura Junrokuro; Ryotaro Nakai

The 106th Division (第106師団, Dai-hyakuroku Shidan) was an infantry division of the Imperial Japanese Army. It has no call sign, similar to 101st division. It was formed 15 May 1938 in Kumamoto as a C-class square division. The nucleus for the formation was the 6th division headquarters. The division was originally subordinated to the Central China Expeditionary Army. Its first division commander was Lieutenant General Matsuura Junrokuro, a graduate from Japanese Army War College.

== Action ==
The 106th Division was assigned to 11th army. Landing south of Tianjin 22 July 1938, it soon participated in the Battle of Wuhan, capturing Jiujiang 26 July 1938. During August 1938, it advanced along railroad to Nanxun District, and in September 1938 was heavily engaged in the Battle of Wanjialing. The 106th artillery regiment was stuck in mountainous terrain, therefore was unable to provide any fire support from 20 September 1938, and entire division suffered heavy losses after its parts has been encircled in Lianxi District. Five of the eight regiments were routed 24 September - 13 October 1938, and division suffered an 11,164 casualties (over half of total strength).

From 1939 the 106th Division was commanded by Lieutenant General Ryotaro Nakai. Under his command the division was in the Battle of Nanchang (in particular divisional artillery acting in Battle of Xiushui River 20 March 1939), and the Battle of Changsha (1939). The division was planned to be demobilized after finishing a mop-up operations in Shantou area.

Due to the ongoing 1939-40 Winter Offensive, the demobilization of the 106th division was cancelled 20 December 1939. Instead it was assigned to the 21st army and sent to hold positions along the south bank of the Yangtze River between Wuhu and Hukou and stood off the attacks of the Chinese.

The division was demobilized on March 9, 1940, with dissolution completed in April 1940. Some of the soldiers of 106th division, in particularly belonging to the 113th infantry regiment, were re-employed in the 56th division formed 10 July 1940.

== See also ==
- List of Japanese Infantry Divisions

== Notes ==
- This article incorporates material from Japanese Wikipedia page 第106師団 (日本軍), accessed 17 June 2016
