= Masaharu Homma =

Japanese army officer and war criminal (1887–1946)

- 本間 雅晴
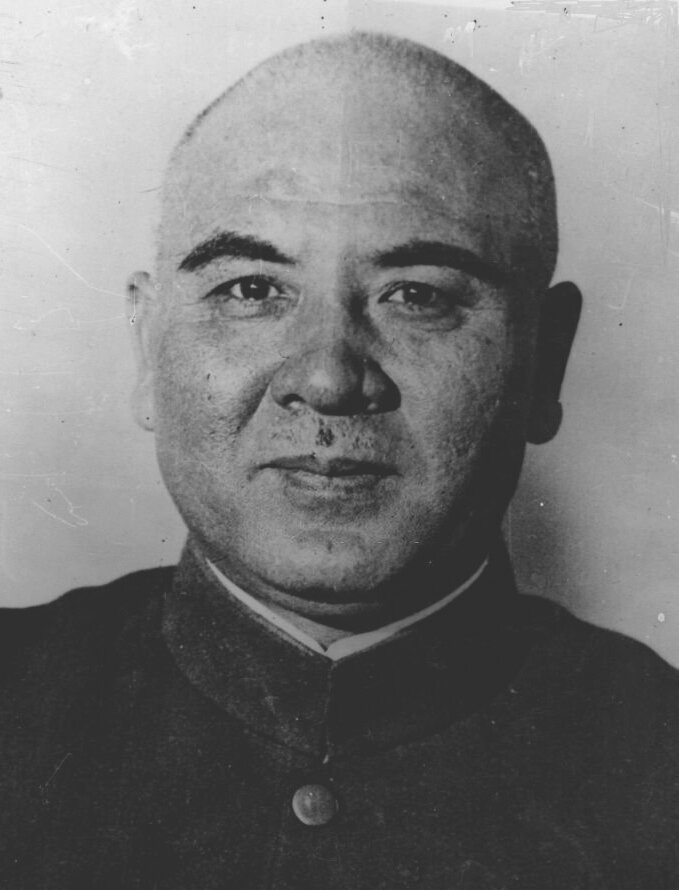
- Homma in 1943

Governor-General of the Philippines
- In office January 3, 1942 – June 8, 1942
- Preceded by: Newly established
- Succeeded by: Shizuichi Tanaka

Japanese Military Administrator; Japanese Military Commander of the Philippines
- In office January 3, 1942 – January 23, 1942
- Preceded by: Newly established
- Succeeded by: Jorge B. Vargas

Personal details
- Born: November 27, 1887 Sado, Niigata Prefecture, Empire of Japan
- Died: April 3, 1946 (aged 58) Los Baños, Laguna, Commonwealth of the Philippines
- Cause of death: Execution by firing squad
- Nickname: "The Poet General"

Military service
- Allegiance: Empire of Japan
- Branch/service: Imperial Japanese Army
- Years of service: 1907–1943
- Rank: Lieutenant General
- Commands: 27th Infantry Division; Taiwan Army of Japan; 14th Army
- Battles/wars: World War I World War II

Masaharu Homma (本間 雅晴, Homma Masaharu; November 27, 1887 – April 3, 1946) was a lieutenant general in the Imperial Japanese Army during World War II. Homma commanded the Japanese 14th Army, which invaded the Philippines and perpetrated the Bataan Death March. After the war, Homma was convicted of war crimes relating to the actions of troops under his direct command and executed by firing squad on April 3, 1946.

== Biography ==
Homma was born on Sado Island, in the Sea of Japan off Niigata Prefecture. He graduated in the 14th class of the Imperial Japanese Army Academy in 1907, and in the 27th class of the Army Staff College in 1915.

Homma had a deep respect for, and some understanding of, the West, having spent eight years as a military attaché in the United Kingdom. In 1917, he was attached to the East Lancashire Regiment, and in 1918, served with the British Expeditionary Force in France, being awarded the Military Cross.

From 1930 to 1932, Homma was again sent as a military attaché to the United Kingdom, where his proficiency in the English language was useful. He was also assigned to be part of the Japanese delegation to the Geneva Disarmament Conference in 1932 and served with the press section of the Army Ministry from 1932 to 1933. He was given a field command again, as commander of the IJA 1st Infantry Regiment from 1933 to 1935, and was promoted to command the IJA 32nd Infantry Brigade from 1935 to 1936.

In 1937, Homma was appointed aide-de-camp to Prince Chichibu, a brother of the Emperor. With him, he made a diplomatic tour in Western Europe, attending the coronation of King George VI. The visit continued to Germany where he attended the Nuremberg rally and met Adolf Hitler, with whom the prince tried to boost relations, following the Anti-Comintern Pact of 1936. He then served as the commander of the Taiwan Army of the Imperial Armed Forces, and composed the lyrics of the military song "Taiwan Army". Yoshiko Yamaguchi ("Lee Shiang Lan" in Chinese) was invited to sing the song to boost Taiwanese morale.

He was promoted to lieutenant general in July 1938.

With the start of the Second Sino-Japanese War, Homma was appointed commander of the IJA 27th Division in China from 1938 to 1940 and directed the blockade of the foreign concessions in Tientsin, where he led the negotiations with the British. After the fall of Nanjing, he declared publicly that "unless peace is achieved immediately it will be disastrous". Homma was removed from his position at the front lines, and reassigned to become commander in chief of the Taiwan Army District from 1940 to 1941.

== The Philippines ==
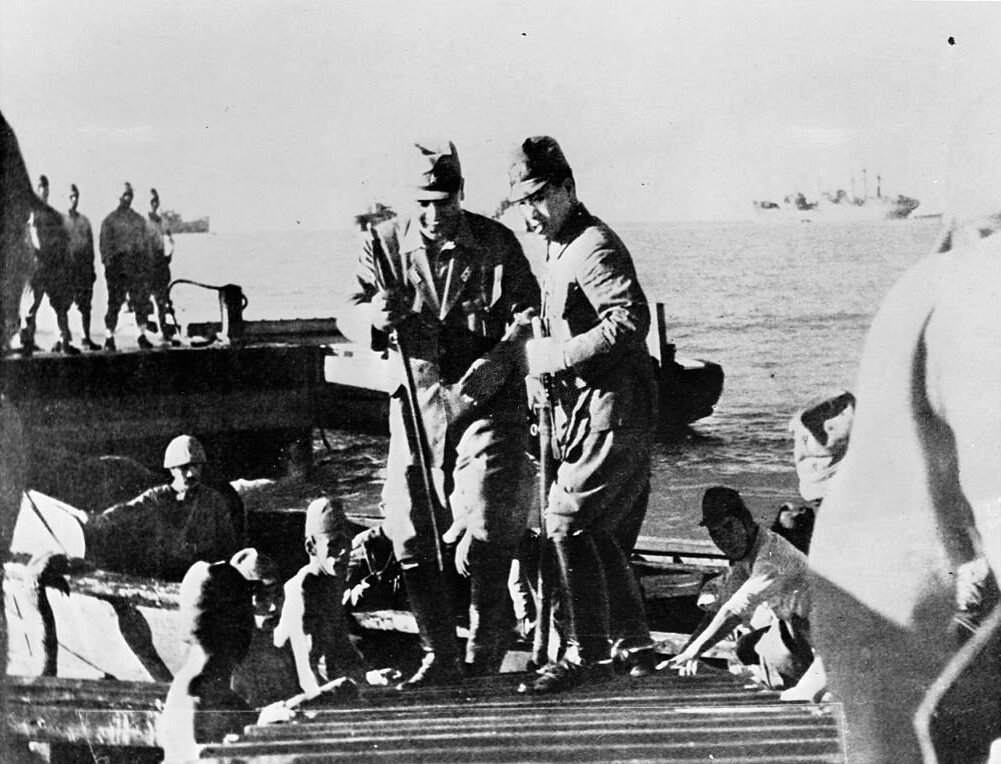
Homma as 14th Army Commander, coming ashore at Lingayen Gulf, 24 December 1941

With the start of the Pacific War, Homma was named commander of the 43,110-man IJA 14th Army and tasked with the invasion of the Philippines. He ordered his troops to treat the Filipinos not as enemies but as friends, and respect their customs and religion. In one instance, on his approach to Manila, Homma stopped his columns and ordered the men to clean up and tighten formations, believing that unkempt soldiers are more likely to loot and rape.

His approach towards Filipino civilians earned him the enmity of his superior, General Count Hisaichi Terauchi, commander of the Southern Army, who sent adverse reports about Homma to Tokyo from his headquarters in Saigon. Also, subversion was growing within Homma's command by a small group of insubordinates, under the influence of Colonel Masanobu Tsuji. In Homma's name, they sent out secret orders against his policies, including ordering the execution of Filipino Chief Justice José Abad Santos and attempted execution of former Speaker of the House of Representatives Manuel Roxas, which Homma found out about in time to stop.

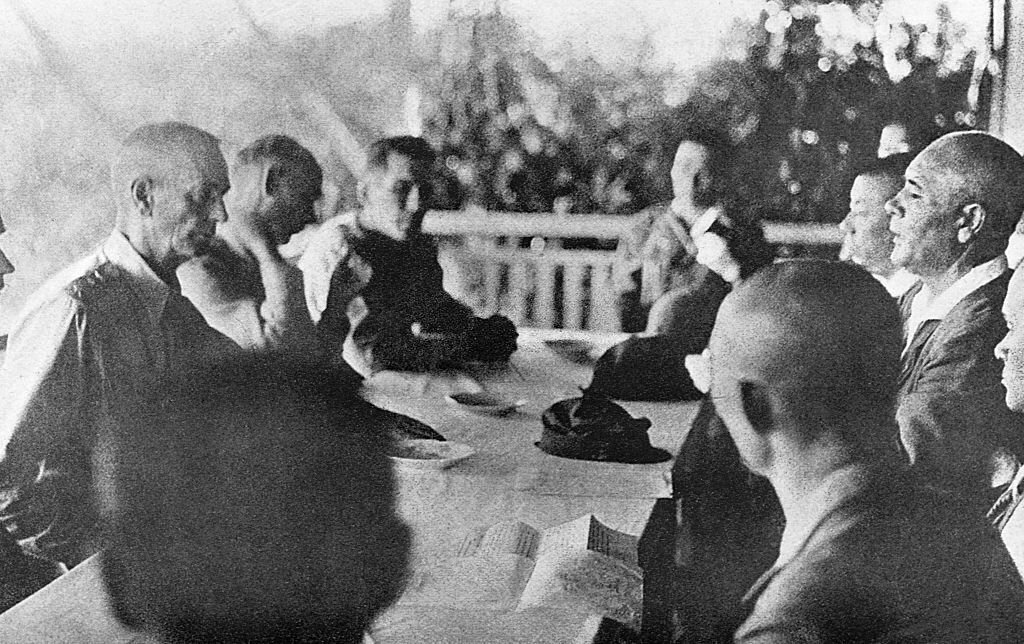
Lieutenant General Jonathan M. Wainwright negotiates the surrender of American forces in Bataan with Homma, 6 May 1942

Worried about the stalled offensive in Luzon, Hirohito pressed Army Chief of Staff Hajime Sugiyama twice in January 1942 to increase troop strength and launch a quick knockout on Bataan. Following these orders, Sugiyama put pressure on Homma to renew his attacks. The resulting Battle of Bataan, commencing in January 1942, was one of the most intense in the campaign. Following Japanese victory in April, at least 60,000 Allied prisoners of war were marched 60 miles (100 km) to a prisoner-of-war camp. Due to ill treatment and abuse from Japanese soldiers, at least 5,500 Allied soldiers died during the march. Homma became known as the Beast of Bataan among Allied soldiers.

Despite Japanese victory in the Battle of Bataan, the deteriorating relationship between Homma and Sugiyama led to the removal of Homma from command shortly after the fall of Corregidor, and he was thereafter commander of the 14th Army in name only. The New York Times erroneously reported prior to the fall of Bataan that Homma was replaced by General Yamashita, and that Homma had committed suicide.

The Imperial General Headquarters regarded Homma as not aggressive enough in war (resulting in the high cost and long delay in securing the American and Filipino forces' surrender), and too lenient with the Filipino people in peace, and he was subsequently forced into retirement in August 1943. Homma retired from the military and lived in semiseclusion in Japan until the end of the war.

== War crimes trial and execution ==
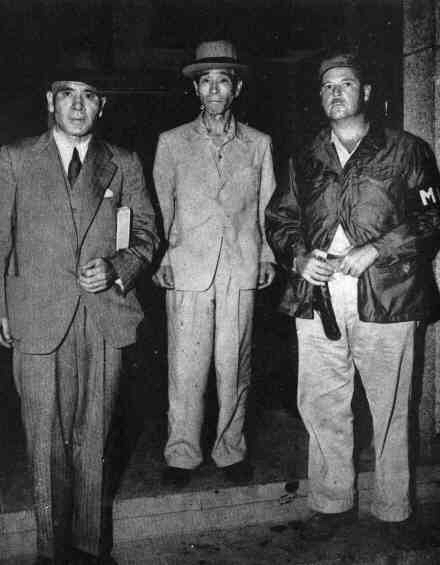
Masaharu Homma (left) and Shigenori Kuroda (center) in U.S. custody

After the surrender of Japan, in mid-September 1945, the American occupation authorities arrested Homma and extradited him to the Philippines, where he was tried by an American tribunal on 48 counts of violating international rules of war relating to the atrocities committed by troops under his command during the Bataan Death March.

Homma was arraigned on December 19, 1945, and the trial was held at the High Commissioner's Residence, Manila, between January 3 and February 11, 1946. A team of six lawyers, none of whom had experience in criminal law, was appointed to defend Homma.

The prosecution called witnesses and filed depositions attesting to the abuse and poor conditions encountered by the Allied soldiers during the march. In particular, James Baldassarre, a survivor of the march, testified to the killings of two Allied officers by the Japanese, and Homma's indifference to the illness and suffering of the Allied prisoners of war.

During his defense, Homma claimed that he was so preoccupied with the plans for the Corregidor assault that he had forgotten about the prisoners' treatment, believing that his officers were properly handling the matter. He claimed that he did not learn of the atrocity until after the war, though his headquarters were only 500 feet (150 m) from the route of the march, stating in court, "I came to know for the first time in the court of [the] atrocities, and I am ashamed of myself should these atrocities have happened." Robert Pelz, a member of Homma's defense team, noted in his diary, "I truly believe [Homma] had no idea of the things that occurred."

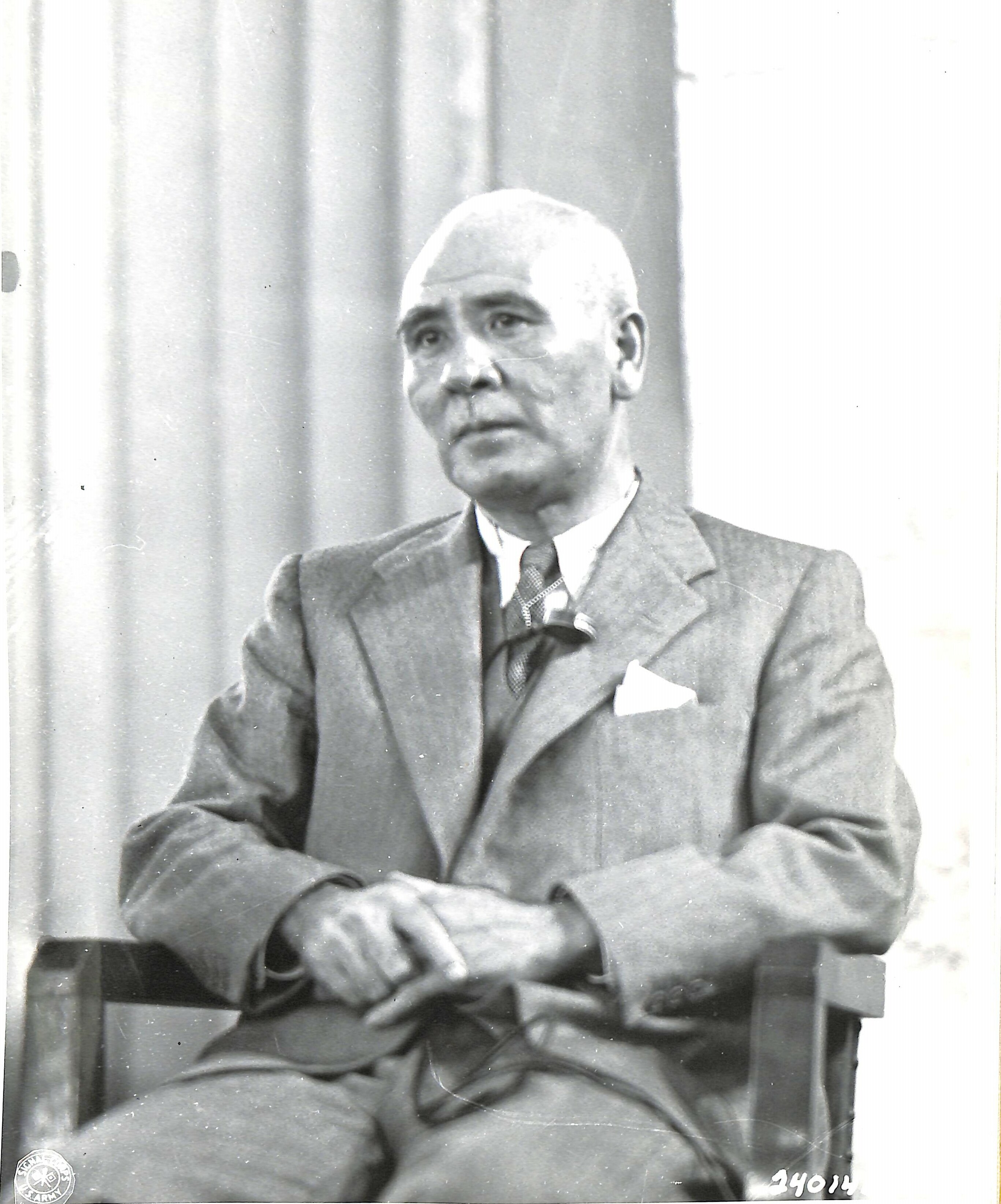
Homma testifies on his own defense during his War Crimes Trial, February 6, 1946

While it is unclear, according to historian Kevin C. Murphy, whether Homma ordered the atrocities that occurred during the march, his lack of administrative expertise, and his inability to adequately delegate authority and control his men, helped to enable the atrocities. After American–Filipino forces surrendered the Bataan Peninsula, Homma turned the logistics of handling the estimated 25,000 prisoners to Major General Yoshitake Kawane. Homma publicly stated that the POWs would be treated fairly. A plan was formulated, approved by Homma, to transport and march the prisoners to Camp O'Donnell. However, the plan was severely flawed, as the American and Filipino POWs were starving, were weak with malaria, and numbered not 25,000 but 76,000 men, far more than any Japanese plan had anticipated.

On February 11, 1946, Homma was convicted of all counts and sentenced "to be shot to death with musketry", which is considered to be more honorable than a sentence of death by hanging. Homma's wife visited Douglas MacArthur to urge a careful review of her husband's case. MacArthur affirmed the tribunal's sentence, and Homma was executed by firing squad by American forces on April 3, 1946, in Los Baños, Laguna, a few kilometers from the former internment camp at the University of the Philippines Los Baños.

== Trial controversy ==
Various claims and charges have been lodged that Homma's trial was unfair or biased and that his trial and execution served primarily to avenge Homma's defeat of General MacArthur's forces. Associate Justice Frank Murphy, in dissent of denial of a hearing by the U.S. Supreme Court on a rule of evidence, stated,

Either we conduct such a trial as this in the noble spirit and atmosphere of our Constitution or we abandon all pretense to justice, let the ages slip away, and descend to the level of revengeful blood purges.

Homma's chief defense counsel, John H. Skeen Jr., stated that it was a "highly irregular trial, conducted in an atmosphere that left no doubt as to what the ultimate outcome would be".

General Arthur Trudeau, a member of the five-member tribunal that condemned Homma, said in a 1971 interview,

There's no question but that some men who were either weak or wounded were shot or bayoneted on this Death March. The question is how many echelons of command up is a person responsible to the point where you should condemn him for murder or crime, and that is what General Homma was accused of ... We need to cogitate about our wisdom in condemning General Homma to death. I must admit I was not much in favor of it. In fact, I opposed it but I could only oppose it to a point that allowed him to be shot as a soldier and not hanged ... I thought he was an outstanding soldier.

General Douglas MacArthur had a differing conclusion and wrote in his review of the case:

If this defendant does not deserve his judicial fate, none in jurisdictional history ever did. There can be no greater, more heinous, or more dangerous crime than the mass destruction, under guise of military authority or military necessity, of helpless men incapable of further contribution to war effort. A failure of law process to punish such acts of criminal enormity would threaten the very fabric of world society.

== Bibliography ==
- Bix, Herbert P. (2001). Hirohito and the Making of Modern Japan. Harper Perennial. ISBN 0-06-093130-2.
- Dupuy, Trevor (1992). Encyclopedia of Military Biography. I. B. Tauris & Co Ltd. ISBN 1-85043-569-3.
- Fuller, Richard (1992). Shokan: Hirohito's Samurai. London: Arms and Armor. ISBN 1-85409-151-4.
- Piccigallo, Philip R (1980). The Japanese on Trial: Allied War Crimes Operations in the East, 1945–1951. University of Texas Press. ISBN 0-292-78033-8.
- Toland, John (1970). The Rising Sun: The Decline and Fall of the Japanese Empire 1936–1945. Random House. ISBN 0-8129-6858-1.
- Totani, Yuma (2015). Justice in Asia and the Pacific Region, 1945–1952: Allied War Crimes Prosecutions. Cambridge University Press.

Preceded by Manuel L. Quezon; President of the Philippines	Japanese Military Administrator of the Philippines (de facto Head of Government); January 2, 1942 – January 23, 1942	Succeeded by Jorge B. Vargas; Philippine Executive Commission
