= Battle of Nanchang =

1939 battle of the Second Sino-Japanese war

Coordinates: 28°41′N 115°53′E

- Part of the Second Sino-Japanese War and the interwar period
Date	March 17 – May 9, 1939 (1 month, 3 weeks and 1 day)
Location	Nanchang city and proximity in the Republic of China
Result	Japanese victory

Belligerents
China	Empire of Japan

Commanders and leaders
(Republic of China (1912–1949)) Xue Yue	(Empire of Japan) Yasuji Okamura

Units involved
National Revolutionary Army Ground Forces	Imperial Japanese Army: (Empire of Japan) 6th Infantry Division; (Empire of Japan) 101st Infantry Division; (Empire of Japan) 106th Infantry Division

Strength
16,338 officers and 243,536 soldiers in 29 divisions in 4 army groups: 19th, 1st, 30th and 32nd Army Groups, Hunan–Hubei–Jiangxi Border Area Guerrilla Command	120,000 troops in 3 divisions: 6th, 101st and 106th, Ishii Tank Unit (130 tanks and tankettes), 1 cavalry regiment, 1 artillery brigade, 2 artillery regiments (200 artillery pieces), 30+ ships and 50 motor boats and one battalion of Marines, and several air squadrons

Casualties and losses
Chinese claim (Note: Initial source miswrote the number of wounded soldiers as 82,077; From 17 March until 15 May 1939; Losses of various guerilla units are not included in the statistics) : 706 officers and 22,536 soldiers killed 1,203 officers and 28,077 soldiers wounded 255 officers and 15,998 soldiers missing	Chinese claim : 24,000 killed or wounded Japanese claim : Nanchang offensive In the Nanchang offensive according to the statistical table compiled by the general staff of the 11th army on 20th April 1939 : 520 killed, 1,676 wounded From 20 March until 10 April 1939 in the Nanchang offensive according to survey data of the medical department of the 11th army on 1st March 1940: 583 killed, 1,984 wounded Chinese counterattack In the Chinese counterattack from mid-April until early May 1939 according to the 11th army in May 1939: 101st division : 150 killed, 399 wounded 106th division : 102 killed, 396 wounded

The Battle of Nanchang (simplified Chinese: 南昌会战; traditional Chinese: 南昌會戰) was a military campaign fought in 1939 around Nanchang, Jiangxi between the Chinese National Revolutionary Army and the Japanese Imperial Japanese Army in the Second Sino-Japanese War. It was the first major conflict after the 1938 Battle of Wuhan.

== Background ==
After the Fall of Nanjing, the Imperial Japanese Navy Air Force launched long-distance pre-emptive strikes from newly captured airbases in Nanjing against targets in Nanchang, including the primary Chinese Air Force base at Qingyunpu. Despite heavy losses of many of the Chinese Air Force's top veteran fighter pilots and most of the equipment over the course of the Battle of Shanghai, Battle of Taiyuan, and Battle of Nanjing, the Chinese Air Force was revitalized through the Sino-Soviet Non-Aggression Pact, and the Chinese pilots along with the Soviet Volunteer Group of pilots continued to put up resistance in the air over Nanchang as the Japanese continued to bomb and soften the defenses there.

After the capture of Wuhan by the Japanese, Wuhan became the base of the Eleventh Army of the Imperial Japanese Army, in the former location of the Fifth and Ninth War Zones of the National Revolutionary Army. Nanchang was a railway hub and the western terminus of the Chekiang-Hunan Railway, being a major supply line between the Third and Ninth War Zones. In addition, it was the location of airfields that threatens shipping routes along the Yangtze River.

The Nationalist government reorganized the chain of command in the Ninth War Zone, with Chen Cheng remaining in the nominal post while Xue Yue was assigned to conduct the actual operations. Shortly before the beginning of the campaign, the Chinese forces amassed 200,000 troops from 52 divisions near Nanchang, but due to logistics the reorganization were largely ineffective.

== Prelude ==
=== Battle of Xiushui River ===
Back in July 1938, Japanese troops had attempted to approach Nanchang during their assault on Wuhan, but their advance were stopped by the Chinese defenders at the Xiushui River. The Chinese positions were well entrenched, blocking the path to Nanchang for the Japanese troops. For the rest of the year, the stalemate continued as both sides remained standstill on each side of the river.

In the spring of 1939, the Japanese troops with their new reinforcements began their new offensive toward Nanchang. On 20 March, the Japanese troops under the direct command of Yasuji Okamura launched heavy artillery shelling over Chinese fortifications on the other side of the Xiushui River. The Japanese sappers under the cover of artillery fire were able to set up bridges quickly which allowed the Japanese tanks to be deployed across the river, decimating the Chinese forces in the process. Two days later, the strategic location of Wucheng, located at where Xiushui River enters Poyang Lake, sustained heavy naval bombardment and airstrikes by the Japanese navy and fell shortly after to the Special Naval Landing Forces on 23 March.

In addition to conventional artillery fire, the Japanese bombardment also utilized toxic gas produced by Unit 731, which had been deployed occasionally in the China field of operations.

==== Order of battle at the battle of Xiushui River ====
The Japanese Army used the "6th Field Heavy Artillery Brigade" artillery unit under the command of Major Gen. Sumita. This force consisted of the following artillery sections:

- 13th Field Heavy Artillery Regiment (Lt. Col. Okoshi, 24 Type 4 15 cm Howitzers)
- 14th Field Heavy Artillery Regiment (Lt. Col. Maruyama, 24 Type 4 15 cm Howitzers)
- 10th Field Heavy Artillery Regiment (Lt. Col. Nagaya, 24 Type 4 15 cm Howitzers)
- 15th Independent Field Heavy Artillery Regiment (Col. Horikawa, 16 Type 14 10 cm Cannons)
- 2nd Independent Heavy Artillery Battalion (Lt. Col. Manba, 4 Type 89 15 cm Cannons)
- 101st Field Artillery Regiment (Lt. Col. Yamada, 34 Type 38-improved 75mm Field Guns)
- 3rd Independent Mountain Gun Regiment (Lt. Col. Morikawa, 24 Type 41 75 mm Mountain Guns)
- 106th Field Artillery Regiment (Lt. Col. Uga, 32 Type 38-improved 75mm Field Guns)
- 2nd Battalion/2nd Independent Mountain Gun Regiment (Major Matsumoto, 12 Type 41 75 mm Mountain Guns)

== Battle ==
=== Japanese attack ===
By 26 March, the Japanese troops supported by tanks had broken out of their Xiushui River bridgehead and reached the west gate of Nanchang, defeating Chinese reinforcements from the Third War Zone. Yasuji Okamura's troops were joined by another Japanese regiment striking south from the north of Nanchang, and the converged Japanese forces began surrounding and laying siege to the city. The city of Nanchang fell the next day, with the Chinese defenders suffering heavy casualties. The Japanese Army continued to clear out the rural area throughout March and April, marking the end of the first phase of the campaign.

=== Chinese counterattack and retreat ===
Despite losing the city of Nanchang to the Japanese, Chinese forces in Jiangxi continued to make a stand. During a period lasting until the end of April some Japanese forces were moved to support operations in other areas (see Battle of Suixian–Zaoyang). The Chinese Nationalists saw an opportunity in this weakening of available Japanese manpower, and planned a counterattack to retake the city. Their directive was to cut off the Japanese contact and disrupt the enemy from the rear.

On 21 April, a surprise attack by the forces of the Third and Ninth War Zones began from the north, west, and south of Nanchang. It began with the 1st Army Group in the 60th Army Division as well as the 58th Army Division attacking from the North. They were later joined by the 74th and 49th Army Groups as they pushed in through Japanese defenses. In the south, this sudden offensive quickly broke through the Japanese positions as they advanced towards Nanchang proper. After five days of relentless advancement, the 32nd Army Group at the front of the Southern Chinese spearhead reached the outer area of Nanchang. Throughout the Chinese attack, the Japanese still retained control over the Xiushui River and continually received supplies and reinforcements throughout the five-day advance of Chinese troops.

Beginning on 27 April, the Japanese began a counteroffensive against the Chinese push by attacking the southern troops. Supported by heavy artillery fire, and air support the Japanese retook several of their strongholds around the city and forced the Chinese divisions to fall back. For the following week, progress was at a standstill on both sides as they held their defensive positions. Hoping to end the conflict quickly, Chiang Kai-shek ordered the Chinese divisions surrounding Nanchang on 2 May to retake the city by 5 May.

Following this order, the Chinese launched a new offensive to try to end the conflict over the city, but the continued reinforcements of the Japanese were unable to be pushed back. After several days of intense fighting, and heavy casualties for the Chinese army, the Chinese were exhausted and forced to retreat on 9 May. Also exhausted from the battle, the Japanese did not pursue the retreating Chinese army.

== Aftermath ==
Casualties for the fighting around Nanchang were claimed as 51,328 killed or wounded for the Chinese and 24,000 for the Japanese. After the fall of Nanchang, the Japanese consolidated their control of Jiangxi and Hunan region. The Nationalists however continued to maintain their presence in the area. The Japanese momentum were further interrupted by the border clashes with the Soviet Union, which broke out shortly after in the Battles of Khalkhin Gol.

== See also ==
- Order of Battle, Battle of Nanchang

== Bibliography ==
- Eastman, Lloyd E. (1986). The Nationalist Era in China, 1927–1949. Cambridge: Cambridge University Press. ISBN 0521385911.
- Garver, John W. (1988). Chinese-Soviet Relations, 1937–1945: The Diplomacy of Chinese Nationalism. New York: Oxford University Press. ISBN 0195363744.
- MacKinnon, Stephen R. (2007). China at War: Regions of China, 1937–1945. Stanford: Stanford University Press. ISBN 978-0804755092.
- Paine, S. C. M. (2017). The Japanese Empire: Grand Strategy from the Meiji Restoration to the Pacific War. Cambridge: Camrbridge University Press. ISBN 978-1107011953.
- Paine, S. C. M. (2012). The Wars for Asia, 1911–1949. Cambridge: Cambridge University Press. ISBN 978-0674033382.
- Taylor, Jay (2009). The Generalissimo. Cambridge: Harvard University Press. ISBN 978-0674054714.
