= Wanjialing =

Region of Jiangxi, China

Wanjialing (simplified Chinese: 万家岭; traditional Chinese: 萬家嶺; pinyin: Wànjīalǐng) is a region located in the Jiangxi province, China. The region is known as the battlefield of the 1938 Battle of Wanjialing where the Chinese Army achieved decisive victory over Japan.

The area is wooded and mountainous, with the Yangtze to the north and the Boyang River to the south. At the time of the war with Japan, the area was used for subsistence agriculture via terraced farming.
