= 27th Division (Imperial Japanese Army) =

- Active: 1938 - 1945
- Country: Empire of Japan
- Branch: Imperial Japanese Army
- Type: Infantry
- Role: garrison
- Size: division
- Garrison/HQ: Beijing
- Nickname: "Decisive Division"
- Engagements: Battle of Wuhan; Operation Ichi-Go

Commanders
- Notable commanders: Masaharu Homma

The 27th Division (第27師団, Dai-nijūnana Shidan) was an infantry division in the Imperial Japanese Army. Its call-sign was the Decisive Division (極団, Kiwame-dan). It was formed in China as the triangular division from the independent mixed brigade and other units 21 June 1938

== Action ==
4 July 1938 the 27th Division was assigned to the 11th Army. From 25 July 1938, the division started to participate in the Battle of Wuhan. After the end of the battle in October 1938, the 27th Division was sent to the staging grounds in Tianjin, where it was subordinated directly to the China Expeditionary Army in September 1939.

On 17 June 1943 the division was moved out of reserve and ordered to garrison Jinzhou. The division was mobilized on 1 February 1944 for the tentative participation in the Operation Ichi-Go, and transferred back to the 11th Army on 17 March 1944. As the Operation Ichi-Go started on 17 April 1944, the 27th division attacked Queshan County on 9 May 1944. On 30 January 1945 the 27th Division also captured an important airfield in Jiangxi. Afterward, while being in Ganzhou, the 27th Division was subordinated to the 23rd Army and sent to Guangdong, providing a coastal defence to Huizhou.

After the Battle of Okinawa started, the 27th Division on 18 April 1945 had received orders to retreat to Shanghai through Nanchang. The division was in Wuxi at the moment of the surrender of Japan on 15 August 1945.

== See also ==
- List of Japanese infantry divisions

== Reference and further reading ==
- Madej, W. Victor. Japanese Armed Forces Order of Battle, 1937-1945 [2 vols] Allentown, PA: 1981
- This article incorporates material from the Japanese Wikipedia page 第27師団 (日本軍), accessed 8 March 2016
