= 101st Division (Imperial Japanese Army) =

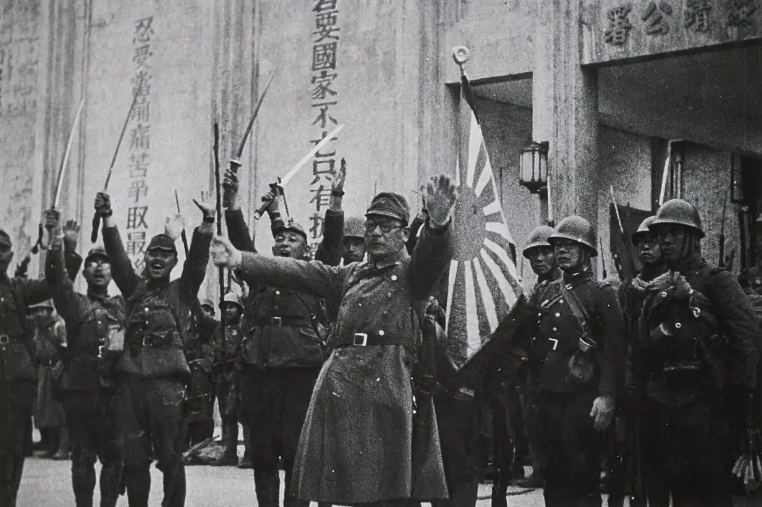
- The 101st Division's 101st Infantry Regiment celebrating after capturing Nanchang, March 28 1939
- Active: 1 September 1937 – 25 February 1940
- Country: Empire of Japan
- Branch: Imperial Japanese Army
- Type: Infantry
- Size: 25,000
- Garrison/HQ: Aoyama, Tokyo
- Nickname: deliberately none
- Engagements: Second Sino Japanese War: Battle of Shanghai; Battle of Nanking; Battle of Xuzhou; Battle of Wuhan; Battle of Wanjialing; Battle of Nanchang; First Battle of Changsha

Commanders
- Notable commanders: Masayoshi Ito; Yaheita Saito

The 101st Division (第101師団, Dai-hyakuichi Shidan) was an infantry division of the Imperial Japanese Army. Unique amongst Japanese divisions, it was never given a call sign. The division was formed 1 September 1937 in Tokyo. The nucleus for the formation was the 13th Independent mixed brigade from Lu'an. The men of the division were drafted from the Aichi mobilization district.

== Background ==
The February 26 Incident in 1936 have exposed how much the 1st division was politicized and become dangerous to the regime itself. Therefore, to dispose of a disloyal Tokyo garrison, the 1st division was sent to Soviet border. As new troops were urgently needed after the Second Sino-Japanese War flared up in July 1937, the new division in Tokyo was raised anyway, but with much lower stature compared to normal line-of-battle divisions.

== Action ==
The division was ordered to join Battle of Shanghai 11 September 1937 as part of the Shanghai Expeditionary Army. In December 1937, the division has also participated in the Battle of Nanking. At that period, the division have crossed Yangtze River and captured Zhenjiang. From March 1938, the 101st division has fought in the Battle of Xuzhou.

4 July 1938, the 101st division was incorporated into 11th army and proceed to participate in Battle of Wuhan until October 1938, in particular suffering heavy losses in the Battle of Wanjialing in September 1938. It also took part in the Battle of Nanchang in March - May 1939 and Battle of Changsha (1939) in October 1939.

The 101st division has started demobilization 7 November 1939, and was dissolved 25 February 1940. From the time of its first combat in Shanghai in September 1937 until its return to Japan in January 1940, a total of 4,829 officers and soldiers of the 101st Division died from all causes.

== See also ==
- List of Japanese Infantry Divisions

== Notes ==
- This article incorporates material from Japanese Wikipedia page 第101師団 (日本軍), accessed 14 June 2016

== Reference and further reading ==
- Madej, W. Victor. Japanese Armed Forces Order of Battle, 1937-1945 [2 vols]

Allentown, PA: 1981
