= Wu Qiwei =

- 吳奇偉
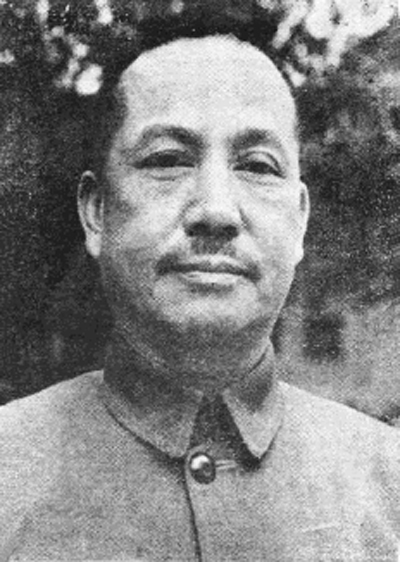

Personal details
- Born: 8 January 1891 Dabu County, Chaozhou prefecture, Guangdong, Qing dynasty (now Dabu County, Meizhou prefecture)
- Died: 11 July 1953 (aged 62) Beijing, People's Republic of China
- Party: Kuomintang (?-1948); Left Kuomintang (1948-1953)
- Awards: Order of Blue Sky and White Sun; Order of the Sacred Tripod

Military service
- Allegiance: Republic of China (1912-1949); People's Republic of China (1949-1953)
- Battles/wars: Warlord Era; Northern Expedition; World War 2; Second Sino-Japanese War; Battle of Songhu; Battle of Wanjialing; Chinese Civil War
Wu Qiwei
- Traditional Chinese: 吳奇偉
- Simplified Chinese: 吴奇伟
Transcriptions
Standard Mandarin
- Hanyu Pinyin: Wú Qíwěi
- Wade–Giles: Wu^{2} Ch'i^{2}-wei^{3}
Hakka
- Romanization: Ng^{2} Ki^{2}-vi^{3}
Yue: Cantonese
- Jyutping: Ng^{4} Kei^{4}-wai^{5}
Southern Min
- Teochew Peng'im: Ghou^{5} Ki^{5}-ui^{2}
Birth name
- Traditional Chinese: 吳晴雲
- Simplified Chinese: 吴晴云
Transcriptions
Standard Mandarin
- Hanyu Pinyin: Wú Qíngyún
- Wade–Giles: Wu^{2}-Ch'ing^{2}-yün^{2}
Hakka
- Romanization: Ng^{2} Qiang^{2}-yun^{2}
Yue: Cantonese
- Jyutping: Ng^{4} Cing^{4}-wan^{4}
Southern Min
- Teochew Peng'im: Ghou^{5} Zên^{5}-hung^{5}
Courtesy name
- Chinese: 梧生
Transcriptions
Standard Mandarin
- Hanyu Pinyin: Wú Shēng
- Wade–Giles: Wu^{2} Sheng^{1}
Hakka
- Romanization: Ng^{2} Sên^{1}
Yue: Cantonese
- Jyutping: Ng^{4} Sang^{1}
Southern Min
- Teochew Peng'im: Ngo^{5} Sêng^{1}

Wu Qiwei (or Wu Chi-wei simplified Chinese: 吴奇伟; traditional Chinese: 吳奇偉; pinyin: Wú Qíwěi; 1890–1953) was a Chinese military commander, who served under both the Republic of China and, after 1949, the People's Republic of China.

== Life ==
Wu Qiwei attended the Wuchang Army School in his early years, and then the Baoding Military Academy. During the Northern Expedition, he served successively as the Chief of Staff of the 36th Regiment, the 34th Regiment, the 12th Division and the 30th Regiment of the 4th Army of the National Revolutionary Army. During the Second Sino–Japanese War, he led the 4th Army to participate in the Battle of Songhu. He was then promoted to command the 9th Army in the Battle of Wanjialing.

In the fall of 1938, he was appointed as the Deputy Commander of the 4th War Theater, and then Deputy Commander of the 6th War Theater and commander-in-chief of the upper reaches of the Yangtze River. After the end of the war, he became Governor of Hunan until 1946, and then he was appointed by Chiang Kai-shek as Commander of the "Bandit Suppression Headquarters" in Guangdong.

In 1948 he began negotiations with Mao Zedong and the Chinese Communist Party, and defected to the Communist side.

In September 1949, he attended the first plenary session of the Chinese People's Political Consultative Conference and was elected a member of the CPPCC National Committee. After the founding of the People's Republic of China, he was appointed a member of the Central–South Military and Political Committee and the Guangdong Provincial People's Government.

He died in Beijing in 1953.
