= 39th Division (Imperial Japanese Army) =

- Active: 1939–1945
- Country: Empire of Japan
- Branch: Imperial Japanese Army
- Type: Infantry
- Garrison/HQ: Hiroshima, Japan
- Nickname: Wisteria Division
- Engagements: Battle of Zaoyang–Yichang; Battle of South Henan; Battle of Changsha (1942); Battle of West Henan–North Hubei

The 39th Division (第39師団, Dai sanjūkyū shidan) was an infantry division of the Imperial Japanese Army, activated 30 June 1939 in Hiroshima, simultaneously with the 38th, 40th and 41st divisions. Its call sign was the Wisteria Division (藤兵団, Fuji Heidan).

== Action ==
On October 2, 1939, it joined 11th army in central China. In May 1940, the 39th division has fought in Battle of Zaoyang–Yichang. From 20 January 1941, it was also assigned to the Battle of South Henan, performing mopping-up duties in west Suizhou. Later the 39th division has participated in the Battle of Changsha (1942). For the long time afterward, the 39th division have manned a defenses against Chinese army at Yichang.

The division was assigned to 34th Army in July 1944. In late March to late May, 1945 the division participated in the Battle of West Henan–North Hubei, ending the advance in the Fancheng District and Xiangyang. It joined the Kwantung Army to defend Manchukuo on 30 May 1945, and at this time the reconnaissance regiment and some other small sub-units were detached from the division. The detachment, together with the remnants of the 68th division, were used to create 132nd division. The 39th division has arrived to Manchukuo 30 July 1945 and assigned to the 30th army in anticipation of the Soviet invasion of Manchuria. Employed to construct fortification, the 39th division had not fought the Soviet army until the surrender of Japan 15 August 1945.
