= Moritake Tanabe =

Japanese officer and war criminal 1889–1949

- 田辺 盛武
- Born: 26 February 1889; Ishikawa, Japan
- Died: 10 July 1949 (aged 60); Medan, Dutch East Indies
- Cause of death: Execution by hanging
- Military career
- Allegiance: Empire of Japan
- Branch: Imperial Japanese Army
- Service years: 1910–1945
- Rank: Lieutenant General
- Commands: 41st Infantry Division; 25th Army
- Conflicts: Second Sino-Japanese War; World War II

Moritake Tanabe (田辺 盛武, Tanabe Moritake; 26 February 1889 – 10 July 1949) was a general in the Imperial Japanese Army during World War II, commanding the IJA 25th Army from April 1943 until the surrender of Japan. He was the brother-in-law of General Hitoshi Imamura. After the war, Tanabe was charged with war crimes, found guilty, and hanged in 1949.

== Early life and education ==
Tanabe was from Ishikawa prefecture, where his father was a former samurai of Kaga Domain and later a colonel in the early Imperial Japanese Army. After attending military preparatory schools in Matsuyama and Hiroshima, he graduated from the 22nd class of the Imperial Japanese Army Academy in 1910 and from the 30th class of the Army Staff College in 1918. His classmates at the Army Staff College included Kanji Ishiwara and Korechika Anami.

== Military career ==
In his early career, Tanabe served on the staff of the Kyoto-based IJA 16th Division, as an instructor at the Army Academy, as a military attaché to France, commander of the IJA 61st Infantry Battalion, and on the staff of the Army Maintenance Bureau. After serving as instructor at the Toyama Army Infantry School from 1933 to 1934, Tanabe served as Chief of the Economic Mobilization Section in the Army Ministry. He returned to the field to command the IJA 34th Infantry Regiment from 1936 to 1937, before his promotion to major general in August 1937 and returning to the Toyama Army Infantry School as its commandant.

With the outbreak of the Second Sino-Japanese War, Tanabe was appointed Chief of Staff of the IJA 10th Army in October 1937. This was a new organization under the Japanese Central China Area Army, created as an emergency reinforcement force to supplement the Japanese Shanghai Expeditionary Army after the Second Shanghai Incident. The Japanese 10th Army subsequently participated in the Battle of Nanking and the subsequent atrocities known as the Nanjing Massacre. The unit was officially disbanded in Nanjing on February 14, 1938. Tanabe was recalled to Japan to become commandant of the IJA Tank School, located in Chiba.

Tanabe was promoted to lieutenant general in October 1939, and given command of the IJA 41st Division. This was also a new organization, raised in Yongsan District, Korea, and was assigned to 1st Army as a garrison force in Japanese-occupied Shanxi Province. From March to November 1941, he was Chief of Staff of the Japanese Northern China Area Army.

Tanabe was recalled to Japan at the end of 1941 to serve as Vice Chief of the Imperial Japanese Army General Staff, and was in this position at the time of the attack on Pearl Harbor, which he had strenuously opposed. Once the war began, he favored a defensive strategy of luring the Allies into campaigns in areas away from their bases in hopes of stretching their supply lines to Japan's advantage. He was instrumental in helping put an end to the disastrous attrition of Japanese forces at Guadalcanal.

As conditions began to deteriorate for Japan along its southern front in the Pacific War, Tanabe was dispatched in April 1943 to Japanese-occupied Sumatra in the Netherlands East Indies to take command of the IJA 25th Army under the Japanese Seventh Area Army at Fort de Kock. He remained at this post for the remainder of the war. Tanabe had reservations about the increasing role of the Indonesian nationalist movement on Java but, responding to the “Koiso Promise” granting increased autonomy and eventual independence to Indonesia, he established the Sumatra Central Advisory Committee and trained locals for administrative leadership roles. However, he attempted to distance himself from local politics by as much as possible.

At the end of the war, he was arrested by Dutch authorities and was sent to Medan where he faced a Dutch military tribunal which accused him of unspecified war crimes. He was sentenced to death on 30 December 1948 and executed on 10 July 1949.

== Decorations ==
- 1941 – Grand Cordon of the Order of the Rising Sun
