= Heisuke =

- Gender: Male

Origin
- Origin: Japanese
- Meaning: Different meanings depending on the kanji used

Heisuke (written: 平祐, 平助 or 平輔) is a masculine Japanese given name. Notable people with the name include:

- Heisuke Abe (阿部 平輔; 1886–1943), Japanese general
- Heisuke Hironaka (広中 平祐; 1931–2026), Japanese mathematician
- Tōdō Heisuke (藤堂 平助; 1844–1867), Japanese samurai
- Heisuke Yanagawa (柳川 平助; 1879–1945), Japanese general
