= Twenty-Fifth Army (Japan) =

Japanese Twenty-Fifth Army
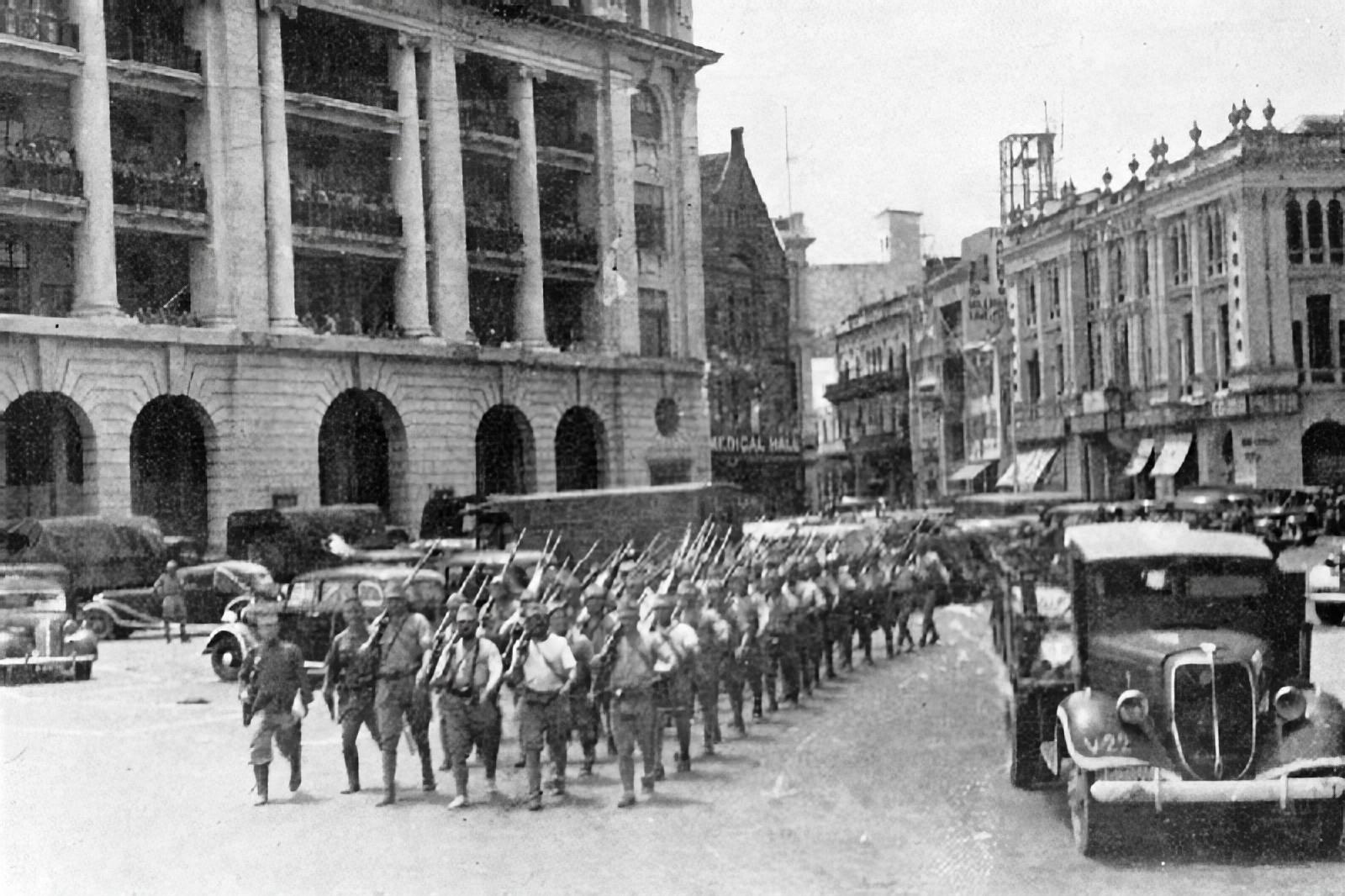
- Japanese troops in Singapore.
- Active: July 5, 1941 – August 15, 1945
- Country: Empire of Japan
- Branch: Imperial Japanese Army
- Type: Infantry
- Role: Corps
- Nicknames: Tomi shudan (富集団, Prosperous)
- Engagements: World War II; Battle of Malaya; Battle of Jitra; Battle of Kampar; Battle of Singapore; Invasion of Sumatra

The Japanese 25th Army (第25軍, Dai-nijyūgo gun) was an army of the Imperial Japanese Army during World War II, noted for its role in the Malayan Campaign, the Battle of Singapore, and the Occupation of Sumatra.

== History ==
The Japanese 25th Army was formed on 5 July 1941 under the Imperial General Headquarters. It was transferred to the control of the Japanese Seventh Area Army under the Southern Expeditionary Army Group on 6 November 1941.

=== Battle of Malaya ===
The Battle of Malaya began when the 25th Army launched an amphibious assault on the northern coast of British Malaya on 8 December 1941. Japanese troops landed at Kota Bharu and advanced down the eastern coastline of the Malay Peninsula. This was made in conjunction with landings at Pattani and Songkhla in Thailand, where units then proceeded south overland across the Thailand-Malayan border to attack the western portion of Malaya.

The Japanese were initially resisted by III Corps of the British Indian Army and several British Army battalions. The Japanese quickly isolated individual Indian units defending the coastline, before concentrating their forces to surround the defenders and force their surrender.

The Japanese forces held a slight advantage in numbers on the ground in northern Malaya, and were significantly superior in close air support, armour, co-ordination, tactics and experience, with the Japanese units having fought in China. The Japanese also used bicycle infantry and light tanks, which allowed swift movement of their forces overland through the terrain that was covered with thick tropical rainforest.

After defeating British and Indian troops at Jitra Japanese forces supported by tanks moved south from Thailand on 11 December, overwhelming British defenses.

Penang was bombed daily by the Japanese from 8 December, and abandoned on 17 December. Arms, boats, supplies and a working radio station were left in haste to the Japanese. The evacuation of Europeans from Penang, with local inhabitants being left to the mercy of the Japanese, caused much embarrassment for the British and alienated them from the local population.

Kuala Lumpur fell unopposed on 11 January 1942. The 11th Indian Division managed to delay the Japanese advance at the Battle of Kampar for a few days, which was followed by the disastrous Slim River battle, in which two Indian brigades were practically annihilated.

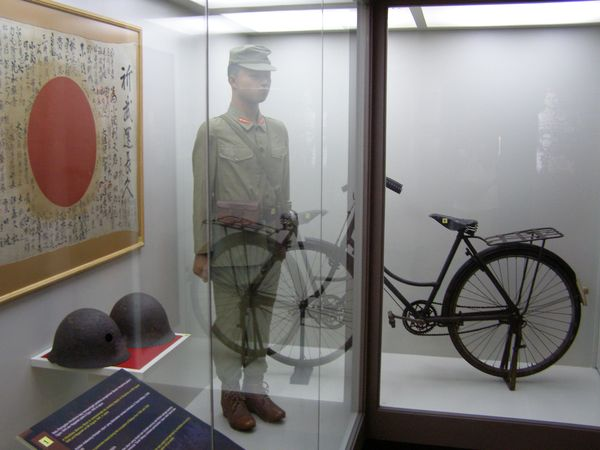
A display at the Malaysian National History Museum, showing the uniform worn by Japanese soldiers and a bicycle used

By mid-January the Japanese had reached Johore where, on 14 January, they encountered troops from the Australian 8th Division, commanded by Major-General Gordon Bennett, for the first time in the campaign. During engagements with the Australians, the Japanese experienced their first major tactical setback, due to the stubborn resistance put up by the Australians at Gemas. The battle, centered on the Gemensah Bridge, proved costly for the Japanese, who suffered up to 600 casualties but the bridge itself, which had been demolished during the fighting, was repaired within six hours.

As the Japanese attempted to outflank the Australians to the west of Gemas, one of the bloodiest battles of the campaign began on January 15 on the peninsula's West coast near the Muar River. Bennett allocated the weak 45th Indian Brigade (a new and half trained formation) to defend the river's South bank but the unit was outflanked by Japanese units landing from the sea and the Brigade was effectively destroyed with its commander, Brigadier H. C. Duncan, and all three of his battalion commanders killed.

On 20 January, further Japanese landings took place at Endau, in spite of an air attack by Vildebeest bombers. The final Commonwealth defensive line in Johore of Batu Pahat–Kluang–Mersing was now being attacked along its full length.

On 27 January 1942 Percival received permission from the commander of the American-British-Dutch-Australian Command, General Archibald Wavell, to order a retreat across the Johore Strait to the island of Singapore.

=== Relocation to Sumatra ===
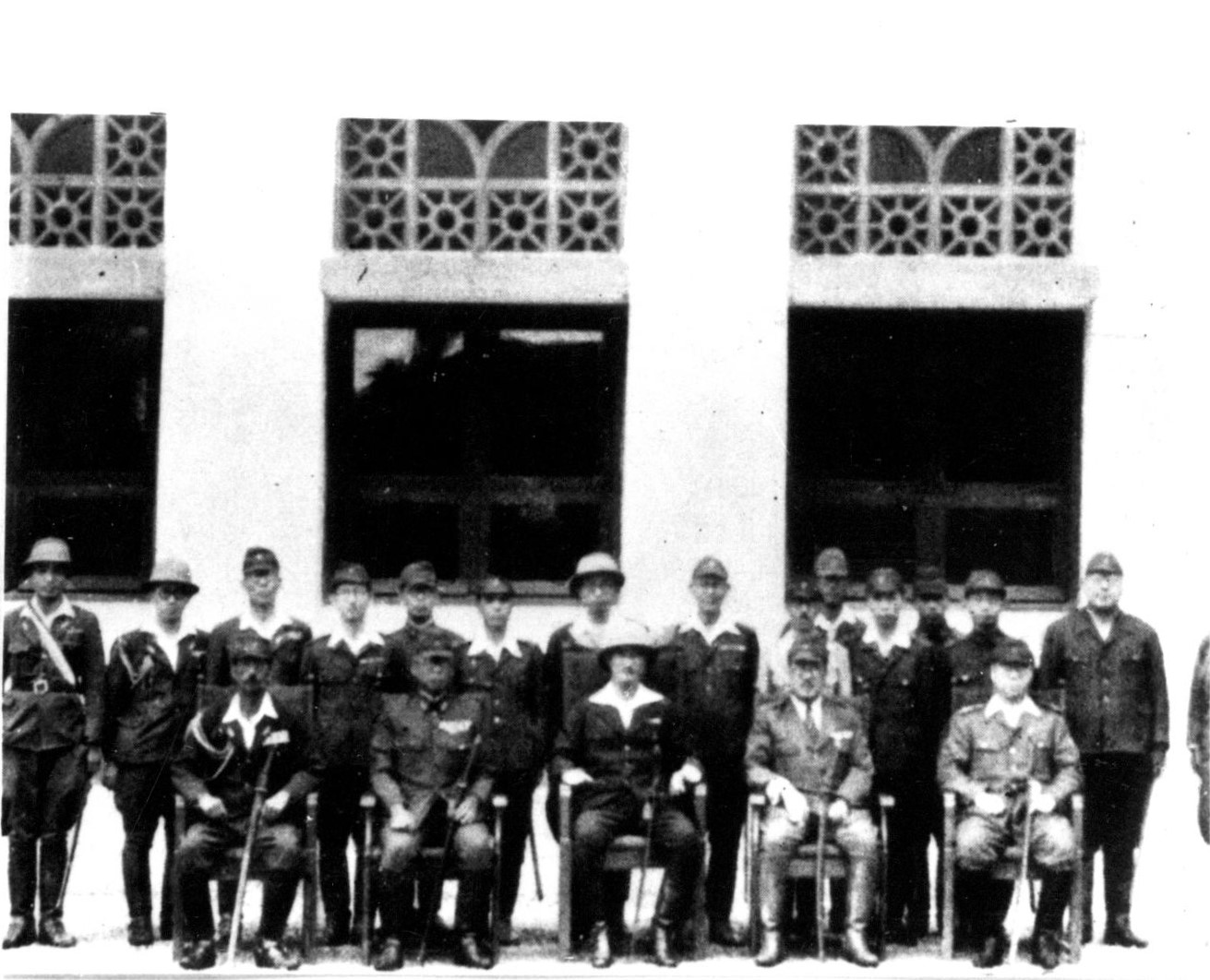
Occupation government of West Sumatra run by the 25th Army. (Middle: Field Marshal Hisaichi Terauchi; Middle-left: General Moritake Tanabe; Middle-right: Governor Yano.)

Following the successful capture of Malaya and Singapore, the IJA 25th Army served primarily as a garrison force for the occupied territories. As the situation grew increasingly desperate of Japanese forces towards the middle of 1945, the IJA 25th Army came under the operational control of the Japanese Seventh Area Army, and its headquarters was transferred to Bukittinggi in the highlands of central Sumatra, which it held until the surrender of Japan in August 1945.

== List of Commanders ==
=== Commanding Officers ===
	Name	From	To
1	Lieutenant General Shōjirō Iida	28 June 1941	6 November 1941
2	Lieutenant General Tomoyuki Yamashita	6 November 1941	1 July 1942
3	Lieutenant General Yaheita Saito	1 July 1942	8 April 1943
4	Lieutenant General Moritake Tanabe	8 April 1943	15 August 1945

=== Chief of staff ===
	Name	From	To
1	Lieutenant General Haruki Isayama	28 June 1941	6 November 1941
2	Lieutenant General Sōsaku Suzuki	6 November 1941	7 October 1942
3	Lieutenant General Yutaka Nichioeda	7 October 1942	14 October 1944
4	Major General Nakao Yahagi	14 October 1944	September 1945
