= 131st Division (Imperial Japanese Army) =

- 第131師団
- Active: 1945–1945
- Country: Empire of Japan
- Allegiance: 23rd army
- Branch: Imperial Japanese Army
- Type: Infantry
- Garrison/HQ: Wuhan
- Nickname: Shusui division
- Engagements: Operation Ichi-Go

The 131st Division (第131師団, Dai-hyakusanjūichi Shidan) was an infantry division of the Imperial Japanese Army. Its call sign was the Shusui Division (秋水兵団, Shūsui Heidan). It was formed 1 February 1945 in Wuhan as a type C(hei) security division, simultaneously with the 132nd and 133rd divisions. The nucleus for the formation was the small parts of the 27th and 40th divisions.

== Action ==
Troops were battle-ready only 20 April 1945 in Qujiang District, Shaoguan and Hengyang. The 131st division was a primarily railroad defense force, stretched along rail lines from Anhui to Guangdong. It participated in the mopping-up phase of the Operation Ichi-Go. 17 June 1945, the 131st division was assigned directly to China Expeditionary Army, and reinforced by artillery company 10 July 1945. It then transfer guard duties to the 8th independent infantry brigade in Anqing and moved to the Xianning where it meet the day of surrender of Japan 15 August 1945.

The division was disarmed 15 September 1945. The parts of 131st division were transported from Anqing to Shanghai 2 February 1946, and from Nanjing to Shanghai 16 February 1946. Over parts arrived to Shanghai 4 March 1946 and 8 March 1946. The majority of division except transport company was dissolved from 28 March 1946 to 13 May 1946. The last detachment of 131st division sailed from Shanghai 31 May 1946, and landed in Sasebo, Nagasaki 6 June 1946, to be dissolved immediately.

== See also ==
- List of Japanese Infantry Divisions

== Notes and references ==
- This article incorporates material from Japanese Wikipedia page 第131師団 (日本軍), accessed 7 July 2016
- Madej, W. Victor, Japanese Armed Forces Order of Battle, 1937–1945 [2 vols], Allentown, PA: 1981.
