= 133rd Division (Imperial Japanese Army) =

- 第133師団
- Active: 1945–1945
- Country: Empire of Japan
- Allegiance: 6th army
- Branch: Imperial Japanese Army
- Type: Infantry
- Garrison/HQ: Guilin
- Nickname: Attack division
- Engagements: none

The 133rd Division (第133師団, Dai-hyakusanjūsan Shidan) was an infantry division of the Imperial Japanese Army. Its call sign was the Attack Division (進撃兵団, Shingeki Heidan). It was formed 1 February 1945 in Guilin as a type C(hei) security division, simultaneously with the 131st and 132nd divisions. The nucleus for the formation was the small parts of the 63rd (or 65th) and 70th divisions.

== Action ==
The 133rd division was initially assigned to 10th army. After the formation was complete, the 133rd division was sent to Hangzhou - Ningbo area. 10 Match 1945, the 133rd division was transferred to the 6th army. At this time, it has artillery company attached. It stayed in Hangzhou until surrender of Japan 15 August 1945.

The 133rd division has sailed from Shanghai in four transports starting 26 March 1946, arriving to Fukuoka 2 April 1946, Tanabe 12 April 1946, Nagato 7 May 1946, and finally Fukuoka 25 May 1946, where divisional headquarters were finally dissolved.

== See also ==
- List of Japanese Infantry Divisions

== Notes and references ==
- This article incorporates material from Japanese Wikipedia page 第133師団 (日本軍), accessed 7 July 2016
- Madej, W. Victor, Japanese Armed Forces Order of Battle, 1937–1945 [2 vols], Allentown, PA: 1981.
