= 41st Division (Imperial Japanese Army) =

Former Japanese military unit

- Active: 1939–45
- Country: Empire of Japan
- Branch: Imperial Japanese Army
- Type: Infantry
- Garrison/HQ: Yongsan District
- Nickname(s): River Division
- Engagements: Second Sino-Japanese War; New Guinea campaign

Commanders
- Notable commanders: Moritake Tanabe, Shimizu Tsunenori, Heisuke Abe

The 41st Division (第41師団, Dai-yonjūichi Shidan) was an infantry division of the Imperial Japanese Army. Its call sign was the River Division (河兵団, Kawa Heidan).

The Imperial Japanese Army (IJA) 41st Division was raised as a triangular division on 30 June 1939 in Utsunomiya, Japan, simultaneously with 38th, 39th and 40th Divisions. Its main combat elements were the 237th, 238th and 239th Infantry Regiments. Other units assigned to the division included the 41st Mountain Artillery Regiment, the 41st Engineer Regiment and the 41st Transport Regiment.

On 2 October 1939, the 41st Division under the command of Lieutenant General Moritake Tanabe was assigned to 1st Army in North China. The division's first deployment was to Shanxi province to provide a garrison coverage.

Upon the outbreak of the Pacific War on 7 December 1941, the division was based in Qingdao in eastern China, under the command of Shimizu Tsunenori.

In November 1942 the division, under the command of Lieutenant General Heisuke Abe, was scheduled to be deployed to Guadalcanal. However, after attempts to reinforce the Japanese garrison on the island failed, the decision was made to divert the 41st Division, along with the 20th Division, which was being shipped from Korea at the same time, and land them on New Guinea. Consequently, the 41st Division arrived at Wewak on 12 February 1943, where they were attached to the 18th Army and subsequently took part in the New Guinea campaign throughout 1943–45, fighting against Australian and United States forces. At this time, the Shoge Detachment was sent to fortify positions at Lae, eventually participating in Salamaua–Lae campaign together with 51st Division. By 10 July 1944, the 18th Army was reduced to essentially just the 41st Division, fighting a failed offensive during the Battle of Driniumor River in July 1944 and suffering heavy casualties in the process. The remnants of the 41st Division have retreated to Prince Alexander Mountains and has a heavy loss of life due malnutrition and disease before the war ended with surrender of Japan 15 August 1945.
