= Battle of Shanggao =

1941 battle of the Second Sino-Japanese War

Coordinates: 28.1833°N 114.8830°E

- Part of Second Sino-Japanese War
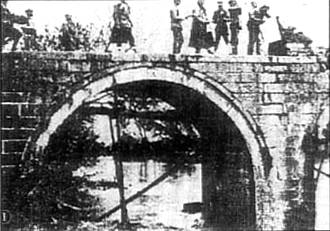
- Retaking a lost bridge.
Date	March 14 – April 9, 1941 (3 weeks and 5 days)
Location	Shanggao county, Jiangxi province, Republic of China
Result	Chinese victory

Belligerents
Republic of China	Empire of Japan

Commanders and leaders
(Republic of China (1912–1949)) Luo Zhuoying	(Empire of Japan) Korechika Anami

Units involved
National Revolutionary Army	Imperial Japanese Army: Central China Area Army

Strength
Chinese Claim : 94,764 troops, of which approximately 70,000 were involved in combat.	Chinese Claim : 65,000 troops in 3 divisions and 1 independent regiment, of which more than 44,000 were involved in combat. 40 armoured cars 150 planes

Casualties and losses
17,719 killed or wounded 2,814 missing 20,533 total	Japanese claim: ~5,500 Chinese claim: 22,000 killed or wounded 17 captured

The Battle of Shanggao (simplified Chinese: 上高会战; traditional Chinese: 上高會戰; pinyin: Shànggāo Huìzhàn), also called Operation Kinkō (Japanese: 錦江作戦), was one of the 22 major engagements between the National Revolutionary Army and Imperial Japanese Army during the Second Sino-Japanese War.

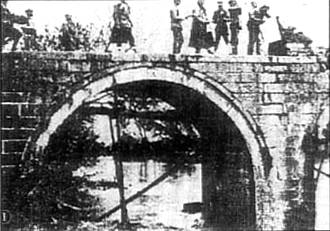
Retaking a bridge during the Battle of Shanggao.

== March events ==
On March 14, 1941, the Japanese 11th army attacked the headquarters of the Chinese 19th army group. Fierce fighting broke out, and a series of bloody see-saw battles continued as both sides contested the position. On March 15, after the base was lost to the Japanese, a Chinese air strike destroyed Japanese food and ammo reserves, demoralizing the Japanese and stalling their attack on the Chinese troops, who used this opportunity to dig new defensive positions. The Chinese positions now contained some 100,000 troops, in three main defensive lines of trenches and concrete-supported bunkers. Even though the Japanese still clung on to the Chinese headquarters, the Japanese commanders were determined to achieve total victory by destroying or capturing all Chinese units, and to do this, it was necessary to breach the Chinese lines.

The Japanese attacked the first of the three Chinese defensive lines, but were repeatedly turned back by the dug-in troops and their heavy machine-gun fire. The Japanese suffered heavy casualties that day, and the next day they advanced behind a smoke screen. The Japanese managed to get to the Chinese lines, and vicious hand-to-hand fighting broke out. Both sides suffered heavy losses, but in the end, the Japanese managed to breach the Chinese first line of defense. After capturing the first Chinese line of defense, there was a lull in the fighting as both sides tended to their wounded. The Japanese called in more reinforcements, while the Chinese rushed in troops from the third line to the second line of trenches to bolster their defense.

On March 22, the Japanese launched an air strike on the Chinese defensive line, resulting in some 100-200 Chinese dead or wounded. Then, they advanced with tanks and armored cars, followed by infantry. The Chinese inflicted heavy casualties on the Japanese armored forces, destroying approximately half of the tanks and killing the infantry behind them with small-arms fire. The Japanese were forced to retreat, and then launched a poison-gas attack. However, the Chinese had already expected this move, and had abandoned the second line of trenches and fallen back to the third line of trenches, minimizing the casualties taken from the gas attack.

On March 24, the Japanese launched an all-out assault on the Chinese, throwing in all of their remaining planes, tanks, and infantry. The Chinese responded with mortar attacks and machine-gun fire, plus their own planes to combat the Japanese planes. The losses on both sides were heavy, with experts thinking that both sides suffered the most casualties on that day. The Japanese had a number of advantages, including tanks, superior training, and superior weapons. However, the Chinese greatly outnumbered the Japanese, due to the Chinese general, Zhu Xiang, rushing in troops at the last moment. At the end of the day, the Chinese lines held, and the Japanese attack had been repelled. After reevaluating the situation, Japanese tacticians concluded that they could not afford to suffer any more losses from what was considered to be an inconclusive battle about the trivial matter of a Chinese headquarters, and on 1 April, they began to withdraw. In haste, the Japanese left behind many of their weapons and wounded troops. They would soon be captured by the Chinese. By 19 April the withdrawal was complete, and both sides now occupied their original positions.

In conclusion, the battle ended with a decisive victory for the Chinese forces, who were able to capture substantial amounts of military equipment and supplies, and boost the morale of the Chinese people.

== Aftermath ==
From May 7 to May 10, 1941, the 19th army group held a memorial meeting for the 9,682 Chinese troops killed in action in the battle of Shanggao. On June 4, the Nationalist Government awarded the Order of Blue Sky and White Sun to Luo Zhuoying, overall commander of the battle, and Wang Yaowu, commander of the 74th corps. Li Tianxia (李天霞), commander of the 51st division of the 74th corps, received the 4th grade of the Order of the Sacred Tripod. The 74th corps was also awarded the Flying Tiger Flag. After the battle, the Japanese 11th army considered the 74th corps their sworn enemy, and aimed to defeat them in the First Changsha Operation (known in China as the Second Battle of Changsha).
