= 132nd Division (Imperial Japanese Army) =

- 第132師団
- Active: 1945–1945
- Country: Empire of Japan
- Allegiance: 6th area army
- Branch: Imperial Japanese Army
- Type: Infantry
- Garrison/HQ: Yichang
- Nickname: Encouragement division
- Engagements: none

The 132st Division (第132師団, Dai-hyakusanjūni Shidan) was an infantry division of the Imperial Japanese Army. Its call sign was the Encouragement Division (振起兵団, Shinki Heidan). It was formed 1 February 1945 in Wuhan as a type C(hei) security division, simultaneously with the 131st and 133rd divisions. The nucleus for the formation was the small parts of the 39th and 68th divisions.

== Action ==
The 132nd division was permanently assigned to 6th area army. Upon formation, the 132nd division took the responsibility on the area previously guarded by the 39th division in Yichang. It stayed in the area of Yichang until surrender of Japan 15 August 1945.

== See also ==
- List of Japanese Infantry Divisions

== Notes and references ==
- This article incorporates material from Japanese Wikipedia page 第132師団 (日本軍), accessed 7 July 2016
- Madej, W. Victor, Japanese Armed Forces Order of Battle, 1937–1945 [2 vols], Allentown, PA: 1981.
