= Tsunenori Shimizu =

Japanese general (1897–1968)

- 清水 規矩
- Born: February 10, 1897; Fukui Prefecture, Japan
- Died: January 19, 1968 (aged 70)
- Military career
- Allegiance: Empire of Japan
- Branch: Imperial Japanese Army
- Service years: 1911―1945
- Rank: Lieutenant General
- Conflicts: World War II; Soviet–Japanese War

Tsunenori Shimizu (清水 規矩, Shimizu Tsunenori; February 10, 1897 – January 19, 1968) was a career military officer and a lieutenant general in the Imperial Japanese Army during World War II.

== Biography ==
Shimizu was the third son of an elementary school teacher in Fukui Prefecture. After attending military preparatory schools in Nagoya and Tokyo, he graduated from the 23rd class of the Imperial Japanese Army Academy in 1911 and from the 30th class of the Army War College in November 1918. From April 1919, he was assigned to the Imperial Japanese Army General Staff. In September 1923, he was appointed military attaché to Riga in Latvia, and afterwards was assigned to Germany, returning to Japan in August 1927.

In August 1930, Shimizu was attached to the Guards 4th Infantry Regiment. He served as a bureaucrat at the General Staff from August 1931 to July 1933, when he was attached to the Technical Research Headquarters, returning to the General Staff in August 1934. He served as Army liaison to the Imperial Japanese Navy General Staff from June to August 1936. Assigned command of the IJA 73rd Infantry Regiment from August 1936, he then served as Aide-de-Camp to Emperor Hirohito from August 1937 to March 1941. In March 1938, Shimizu was promoted to major general, and to lieutenant general in December 1940.

In March 1941, Shimizu was assigned command of the IJA 41st Division, which was at the time a garrison force based at Qingdao, China. In May 1942, he returned to Japan and entered the reserves. However, in July 1942 he was reactivated to become Deputy Inspector-General of Military Training, one of the top posts within the Imperial Japanese Army. He served as chief of staff of the Southern Expeditionary Army Group from May 1943 and as chief of staff of the IJA Seventh Area Army from March 1944. This was a new field army raised under the Southern Expeditionary Army Group for the specific task of opposing landings by Allied forces in Japanese-occupied Malaya, Singapore, Borneo, Java, and Sumatra, as well as to consolidate a new defense line after the loss of the Solomon Islands, New Guinea and eastern portions of the Netherlands East Indies. It had its headquarters at Singapore. In June 1944, Shimizu was reassigned to take command of the IJA 5th Army in Manchukuo. By the time he reached Manchukuo, much of its equipment and experienced troops had already been redirected to other commands in the Southeast Asia theatre of operations, and its poorly equipped and poorly trained forces were no match for the experienced battle-hardened Soviet armored divisions in the Soviet invasion of Manchuria.

Shimizu became a prisoner of war after being captured by the invading Soviet forces, and he was sent to Siberia until being released in December 1956 on the restoration of diplomatic relations between post-war Japan and the Soviet Union. He died in 1968.
