= Battle of Changsha (1941–1942) =

Battle of World War II

Coordinates: 28.2000°N 112.9670°E

Third Battle of Changsha
- Part of the Second Sino-Japanese War of World War II
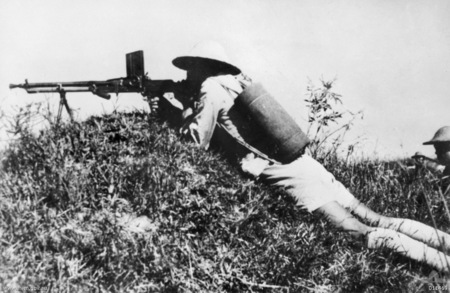
- A Chinese soldier mounts his ZB vz. 26 light machine gun at Changsha, January 1942.
Date	24 December 1941 – 15 January 1942 (3 weeks and 1 day)
Location	Changsha city, Luo River (Henan), Republic of China
Result	Chinese victory

Belligerents
(Republic of China (1912–1949)) Republic of China	Empire of Japan

Commanders and leaders
(Republic of China (1912–1949)) Xue Yue	(Empire of Japan) Korechika Anami

Units involved
(Republic of China (1912–1949)) National Revolutionary Army; 9 armies - 20+ divisions	(Empire of Japan) Eleventh Army: 6th Division; 40th Division; 3rd Division; (Empire of Japan) Imperial Japanese Navy

Strength
19,623 officers and 249,058 soldiers	120,000 soldiers 600 pieces of artillery 200 aircraft

Casualties and losses
Chinese claim: 401 officers and 11,176 soldiers killed 710 officers and 15,613 soldiers wounded 43 officers and 2,403 soldiers missing Japanese claim: 28,612 killed 1,065 captured	Chinese Claim: 33,941 killed in action 23,003 wounded in action 148 captured Japanese claim: 1,591 killed 4,412 wounded

The Third Battle of Changsha (24 December 1941 – 15 January 1942; Chinese: 第三次長沙會戰) was the first major offensive in China by Imperial Japanese forces following the Japanese attack on the Western Allies and the attack on Pearl Harbor, and Japan's third of four attempts to capture the Chinese city of Changsha. It was conducted with the purpose of severing Chinese lines of communication with British Hong Kong, and seizing control of Changsha's food production.

The offensive resulted in failure for the Japanese, as Chinese forces were able to lure them into a trap and encircle them. After suffering heavy casualties, Japanese forces were forced to carry out a general retreat.

== Background and forces ==
The city of Changsha, the capital of Hunan Province, was a point of major importance to the Chinese war effort. It was the key to China's most important rice-producing provinces, areas which supplied food for populous areas around the wartime capital of Chongqing. Both sides recognized the importance of this city, and had fought two major battles over the city in the previous two years.

The offensive was originally intended to prevent Chinese forces from reinforcing the British Commonwealth forces engaged in Hong Kong. Infuriated by Chinese claims of having defeated him in his September-October 1941 Changsha Offensive, Japanese Eleventh Army commander General Korechika Anami originally intended to mount a thrust with his army to support the Twenty-Third Army's attack on Hong Kong. Anami's main force consisted of 27 infantry battalions, 10 artillery battalions, and one artillery battery. However, the attack was carried out after Hong Kong had fallen, defeating the point of the operation. In addition, the Japanese had prepared the operation as a swift attack by light forces, and thus only prepared a slender supply route. It was a logistical weakness the Chinese would soon exploit.

Defending Changsha were Chinese forces under the command of southern General Xue Yue. Nicknamed the "Tiger of Changsha," Yue and his men had managed to defend Changsha against two large attacks by Japanese forces in 1939 and 1941. In both instances, the Chinese had lured the Japanese deep into their territory, and upon engaging their forces in Changsha, severed their supply lines from the rear, forcing the Japanese back into retreats and inflicting heavy losses.

The urban city of Changsha was defended by the 10th Corps. The corps had been defeated in the Second Battle of Changsha and its commander Li Yutang was dismissed. With the Japanese Army approaching the city and replacement commander Zhong Bin (鍾彬) not yet arriving, Li Yutang was reinstated as the commander. The officers and soldiers of the 10th Corps were in high spirits, seeing this battle as a chance for rehabilitation of the corps and their commander.

== Attack ==
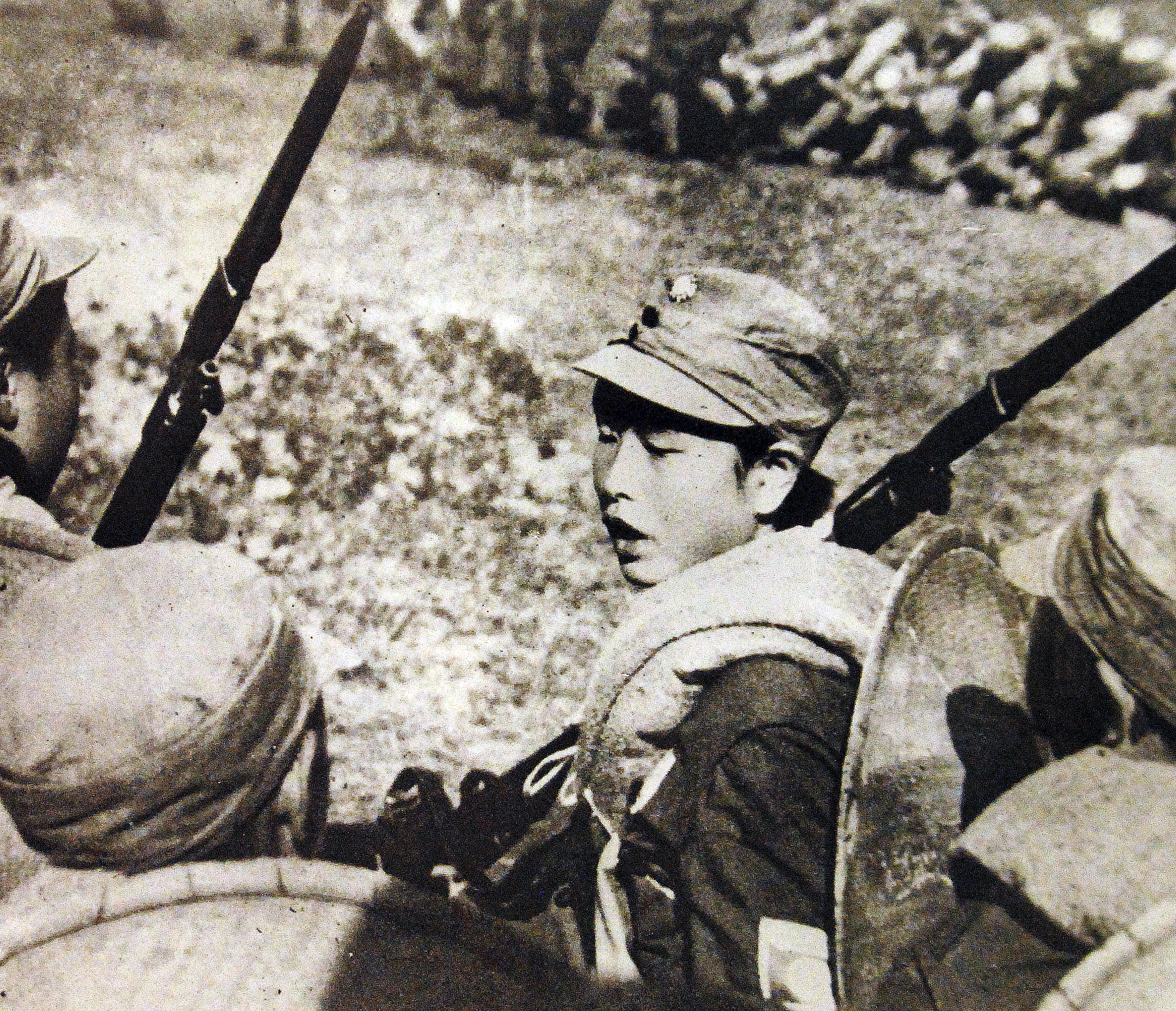
Chinese child soldiers en route to the Changsha battlefield

The Japanese commenced combat operations on 24 December 1941, with the 6th and 40th divisions leading the way. Japanese forces initially cut through Chinese defenders. By 29 December 1941, believing that the city of Changsha was "inadequately defended", Anami elected to capture it. He was supposed to drive from the south of Hankou, about 19 miles (31 km) east of the Hankou-Canton Railway, and reach the Miluo River, but disobeyed orders from Imperial General Headquarters and penetrated Chinese lines as far as 22 miles (35 km) toward Changsha. He committed the 3rd and 6th divisions, and his forces were surprised to be met with fierce opposition.

Morale among the soldiers of the 3rd Division was initially high as the unit approached Changsha City on 1 January 1942, with divisional commander Toyoshima saying he would be having his New Year's celebration inside Changsha. The attack started with the 68th Infantry Regiment pursuing retreating Chinese troops from the Shiziling (獅子嶺) Heights, three kilometers southeast of Changsha. In the evening, Kato Soichi led the main force of the 2nd Battalion of the 6th Infantry Regiment towards Changsha. Battalion Commander Kato led the 5th and 8th companies and the battalion headquarters in launching a night assault at the Chinese position, fighting fiercely with the defenders. The battalion headquarters soon broke into Baishaling (白沙嶺), but was quickly surrounded. At dawn on the 2nd, Kato was wounded from a bullet to the stomach. In the afternoon, a NCO fought his way out, returned to the main base of the battalion, and reported the dire situation. With cries of "Save the battalion commander!", the battalion launched desperate charges at the Chinese defenses. The battalion continued searching for the commander until the 4th when the unit decided to report him as killed in action. According to Chinese sources, battalion commander Liu Zhengping (劉正平) from Fang Xianjue's 10th Reserve Division led a company to attack the enemy trapped in Baishaling, claiming to have killed more than 100 enemy soldiers, including Kato, and seizing important documents. Xue Yue was elated when he received those documents, as they revealed the Japanese Army's plan and how little ammunition they had, saying "Even if it's a piece of paper, it weighs more than ten thousand machine guns."

Fighting was the most intense over southern and eastern gates of the city's walls, and both sides waged vicious see-saw battles over points of tactical importance. One mound, nicknamed "Graveyard Hill," changed hands 11 times in less than 72 hours. On the night of 1 January, Fang Xianjue wrote a suicide note, vowing to live and die in Changsha. His letter, which was intended for his wife, was instead sent to the Changsha Daily by Yang Zhenghua (楊正華), the acting director of the political department. The next day, the Changsha Daily published the full text of the letter with the headline "Commander Fang vowed to defend the land to the death and has made his will in advance".

On 2 January, the mortars and artillery guns of the Chinese Army in Changsha and on the opposite bank of the Xiang River fired all at once, hitting various areas of the 3rd Division. The 3rd Division repeatedly assaulted the city walls under the cover of aircraft, but encountered fierce resistance from the 10th Corps and bloody battles unfolded everywhere. The 30th regiment of the 10th reserve division and the 68th Infantry Regiment of the 3rd Division clashed at the Taojiachong (陶家冲) and Hongshizui (紅石嘴) positions and the repair shop. On the opposite bank of the Xiang River, the 7th Company of the 18th Infantry Regiment came under attack from the baggage battalion of the 10th Reserve Division and all of its officers were killed or wounded. In the evening, the 6th Division, which had been reluctant to take part in the capture of Changsha, was ordered to support the 3rd Division in the city.

At dawn of 3 January, the 2nd Battalion of the 23rd Infantry Regiment of the 6th Division attacked the north side of Changsha. The 570th regiment of the 190th Division resisted fiercely and artillery guns from Yuelu Mountain fired at the attacking Japanese soldiers. At the same time, part of the Japanese 49th Infantry Regiment attacked the Chinese 568th regiment. By the afternoon, the fighting had turned into a stalemate and the Japanese side had suffered heavy losses from artillery fire. At the southern side, Ishii's 18th Infantry Regiment of the 3rd Division attacked the Liuyang Gate (瀏陽門) and encountered fierce resistance from the Chinese 3rd Division, with some Japanese soldiers dying in hand-to-hand combat.

At 6:30, Lieutenant Colonel Shozaburo Yokota led his 2nd Battalion of the 68th Infantry Regiment into attacking the repair shop. In the ensuing battle with the 30th regiment of the 10th Reserve Division, the lieutenant colonel was killed in action. Throughout the day, the battalion struggled against the stubborn resistance and bunkers of the Chinese Army. Moreover, the 30th regiment launched repeated counterattacks and the battalion was under artillery fire from the Yuelu Mountain. Regimental Adjutant Ichiro Kamino was killed while trying to contact the front line. All officers of the 5th Company were wounded and ammunition was running low.

At dawn on 4 January, the 68th Infantry Regiment commander ordered the 1st Battalion to attack Huangshan (荒山) and the 2nd Battalion to attack Dongguashan (東瓜山). However, the report was not received by the 1st Battalion, so the 2nd Battalion attacked alone. With the 5th Company at the front and the 8th Company as the reserve, the battalion started its attack. Eventually, the 8th Company passed through the 5th Company and captured the Dongguashan Heights by morning. The 30th regiment immediately launched repeated counterattacks. The company's ammunition was soon exhausted, resulting in close-quarters fighting. Lieutenant Kuroiwa Nakaji, commander of the 8th Company and a veteran of the battle of Shanghai, was killed in action and the company had to retreat without being able to recover his body. On the other side, after four days of fighting, the 30th regiment had only 8 officers and soldiers left.

The Japanese 3rd Division managed to penetrate into the southeastern side of the city, but could make no further advances. On 4 January 1942, the Eleventh Army had managed to occupy "all the important points of the city," but they were in danger of encirclement by counterattacking Chinese.

The Chinese, in a near-repeat of the previous battles for Changsha, had penetrated to the rear of the main Japanese force and severed their supply lines. As a result, Japanese supplies in ammunition and rations, already strained by days of combat, plunged to dangerously low levels: soldiers in some regiments had only 10-15 bullets each, and some platoons only had a single grenade to share amongst themselves. Japanese prisoners later taken by the Chinese were reported to have not eaten for days prior to their capture, having prepared only 5 days worth of food.

== Japanese retreat ==
Since 3 January, the Japanese Army started detecting about 30 Chinese divisions tightening their encirclement around the Japanese units in Changsha. The 79th Corps approached Dongshan (東山), the crossing point of the 3rd Division for the Liuyang River, and occupied the bridge, forcing the defenders to retreat. The 3rd Battalion of the 13th Infantry Regiment sent its 12th Company to counterattack the enemy. The centre of the bridge were blown up by Chinese artillery, and the 1st platoon of the 2nd Company of the 3rd engineer regiment rushed towards the bridge. The platoon commander and several engineers were immediately killed by grenades and due to fierce enemy fire, there was little progress in repairing the bridge. At the same time, the 26th Corps approached Langli City (朗梨市), the crossing point of the 6th Division which was defended by the 45th Infantry Regiment. The corps overran several positions while closing in on the 6th regiment of the Quartermasters directly defending the bridge. For the next two days, the regiment engaged in fierce fighting against the 26th Corps, securing the bridge. The 1st Battalion was attacked north of Langli City, suffering more than 50 casualties in the defensive battle.

Having run out of ammunition that could be airlifted, and hearing about the various Chinese units that were converging towards Changsha, the staff of the 11th army, was filled with anxiety as city was still not occupied. At 5:00 p.m. on the 3rd, chief of staff Kinoshita, deputy chief of staff Futami, and operations staff officer Shimamura all visited General Anami's office and advised him to stop the fighting and retreat on the night of the 4th. Anami rejected the proposal, saying that "the 6th division has just joined the battle on the morning of the 3rd, and thus naturally there has been no progress. I cannot approve of the premature end of the attack. We should wait and see how things go first." However, the staff officers insisted that they should turn back now so that they can reach the north bank of the Miluo River by the morning of the 5th, and the army commander was finally forced to approve the proposal.

When the 3rd Division received the order to retreat on the night of the 3rd, Divisional Commander Toyoshima immediately telegraphed General Anami requesting the retreat be postponed for one day to recover Kato Soichi's body and capture Changsha. On the same day, he sent staff officer Ishii to the 6th Division to explain his intention and request joint action for the operation. At this time, the 3rd Division had suffered more than 700 casualties and had almost run out of ammunition. Therefore, the staff officers of the 11th Army believed that Changsha could not be captured and they should turn back. Staff Officer Ishii returned to the division and reported that the 6th Division had told him that they should act in accordance with the army commander's order. Thus, the 3rd Division began preparation to turn back.

The withdrawal was conducted under "considerable hardship," according to a post-war Japanese account. "Not only did the Japanese forces have to fight off persistent assaults from large enemy forces... but they had also been compelled to escort a large number of casualties and rear service units." Only their near complete air superiority prevented the Japanese from being annihilated entirely.

The Chinese forces, some 20 divisions in nine armies, pursued the Eleventh Army, killing large numbers of Japanese troops in the process. On 6 January, the 1st and 2nd battalions of the 236th Infantry Regiment of the 40th Division was besieged by the 37th Corps at the Dashantang (大山塘) position. In the early morning of 7 January, the 60th and 95th divisions of the 37th Corps took advantage of the morning fog to launch a fierce attack on the position of the regiment. Within 15 minutes, the 2nd Battalion commander and the 5th and 6th Company commanders were killed in action, 12 other officers were killed or wounded, and the total casualties reached 150. The regiment was relieved by the 234th Infantry Regiment on the 9th, but by then its casualties had reached 390.

The 20th and 58th Corps of the Sichuan Army were stationed in Yingzhu Mountain (影珠山), blocking the 3rd and 6th divisions' retreat. The 9th independent mixed brigade, which were ordered to support the retreat, formed a mixed battalion to launch a surprise night attack at Yingzhu Mountain. The mixed battalion consisted of 150-160 troops of the 1st Company, about 60 troops of the 4th Company, an artillery platoon, a portion of the communications squad, and medics. It was led by the commander of the 1st Company, Shigeru Yamazaki, of the 40th Independent Infantry Battalion. On the night of the 8th, they began to make their move, attacking the command posts of the new 10th Division and 58th Corps from the northern side of Yingzhu Mountain. By the early hours of 9 January, the mixed battalion had reached the summit and planted the Japanese flag. The special services company and a portion of the 30th regiment of the new 10th Division and direct units of the 58th Corps cooperated with the special services company, cavalry company, and a portion of the 400th Regiment of the 134th Division of the 20th Corps to surround the mixed battalion. By 10 a.m., ammunition had run out and the two sides engaged in hand-to-hand combat. Before his death, Captain Yamazaki ordered sergeant Saito to report to his superiors about the battle situation and their decision to fight to the death. After the sergeant was sent off, the remaining Japanese soldiers were killed in action or committed suicide. The 9th independent mixed brigade assumed most of Yamazaki's battalion were killed in action after receiving the report, but still made preparation in case some survived. On the 10th, the Japanese air force reported that only a large number of corpses were found on the high ground where the Japanese flag was planted yesterday. The Chinese also recorded killing more than 200 soldiers of the 9th independent mixed brigade at Yingzhu Mountain. The sacrifice of the mixed battalion and the actions of other units of the 9th independent mixed brigade ensured a safer retreat for the 3rd and 6th divisions passing through the mountain.

== Aftermath ==
Changsha had been successfully defended by the Chinese Army for a third time. Against a backdrop of swift victories across the Pacific, Changsha was the only place where the Japanese Army was suffering defeat in early 1942.

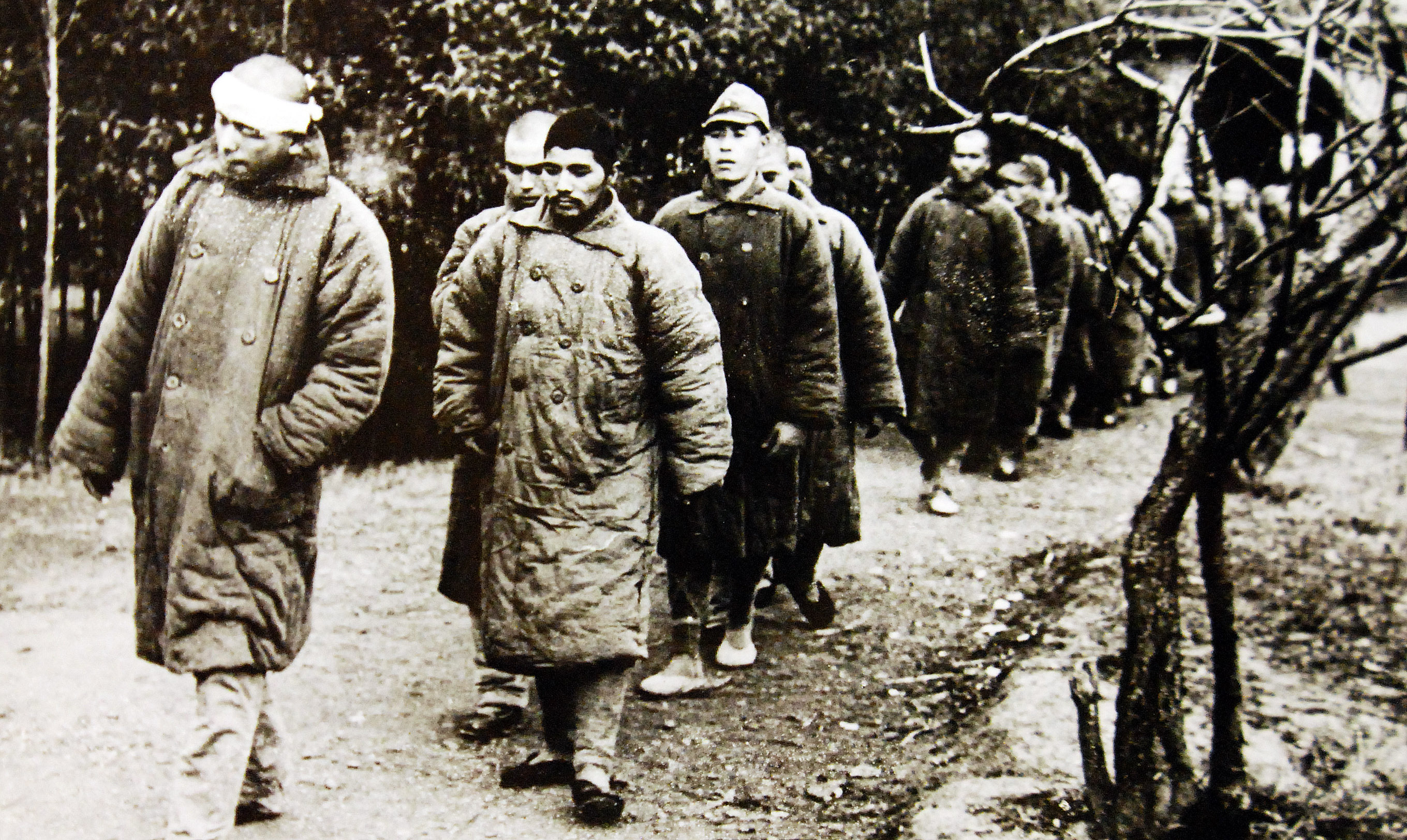
Japanese POWs captured by the Chinese Army at Changsha

Both sides had suffered heavy losses as a result of the fighting. Historian Richard B. Frank, citing Chinese claim, estimates the Japanese lost almost 57,000 troops in the battle, including some 33,941 killed and 23,003 wounded. He Chengjun, Director-General of Courts-Martial of the Military Commission, recorded in his diary on 25 February 1942 that when Xue Yue reported this number to the Military Commission, everyone present laughed at him and Chiang Kai-Shek himself considered the claim too unrealistic. The New York Times estimated the Japanese had lost some 52,000 men in the fighting around Changsha. The Nome Nugget reported the Japanese had lost 15,000 men on 2 January alone, including many high-ranking officers, mostly by artillery fire. The Chinese also suffered heavy casualties. The intensity of the fighting combined with the Chinese Army's harsh discipline meant that Chinese soldiers often fought to the death at their positions, with one Chinese regiment being reduced to 58 survivors after only a few days of fighting.

The Japanese Army reported their losses as 1,591 killed and 4,412 wounded, and claimed 28,612 Chinese soldiers killed and 1,065 Chinese soldiers captured. The losses of the 3rd and 6th divisions accounted for nearly two-thirds of the Japanese losses in the battle. The Ninth Military Front reported their losses at 30,346 killed, wounded, or missing.

On 24 January 1942, Xue Yue and Li Yutang were awarded the Order of Blue Sky and White Sun for their roles in the third battle of Changsha. On the same day, Li Yutang was promoted to deputy commander of the 27th army group while still serving as the commander of the 10th Corps. The 10th Corps earned the title "Mt. Tai Army" and was well respected. On 28 March 1942, Li Yutang resigned as commander of the 10th Corps to serve fully as deputy army group commander. Fang Xianjue, the commander of the 10th Reserve Division, was promoted to corps commander.

On 8 September 1942, the 3rd Division, 190th Division, and 10th Reserve Division of the 10th Corps each received the Flying Tiger Flags from the Nationalist Government for their role in defending the Changsha city.

Changsha would remain in Chinese hands until 1944, when Japanese forces would capture the city as part of the Ichi-Go offensive. By then however the tide has completely turned against Japan both in China and the Pacific and the city's importance had diminished greatly. The city would be retaken by Chinese forces in 1945.

Pictures of Japanese corpses were taken at the third battle of Changsha.

Video was filmed of the third battle of Changsha.

Japan created propaganda footage of the second battle of Changsha and battle of Yichang.

== See also ==
- Battle of Changsha (1939)
- Battle of Changsha (1941)
- Battle of Changsha (1944)
- Battle of Changsha, a TV series depicting this event
