= Battle of Changsha (1941) =

Japan's second attempt at taking the city of Changsha, China

Second Battle of Changsha
- Part of the Second Sino-Japanese War
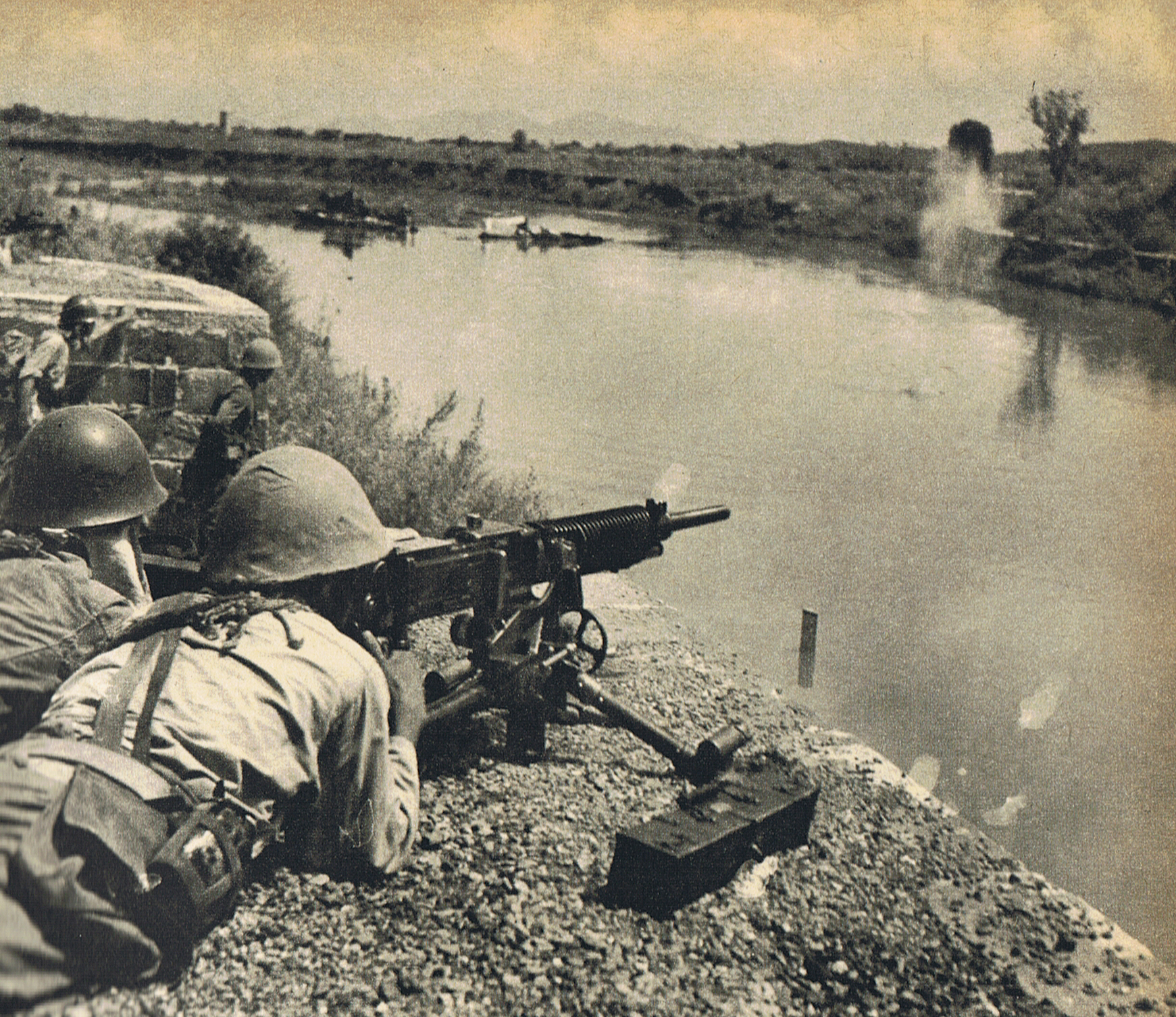
- A Japanese soldier firing a Type 92 Heavy Machine Gun across the Miluo river in September 1941
Date	September 6 – October 8, 1941 (1 month and 2 days)
Location	Changsha city in the Republic of China 28.2000°N 112.9670°E
Result	See § Result

Belligerents
Republic of China	Empire of Japan

Commanders and leaders
(Republic of China (1912–1949)) Xue Yue	(Empire of Japan) Korechika Anami

Units involved
National Revolutionary Army Ground Forces	Imperial Japanese Army; Imperial Japanese Navy

Strength
In the Changsha battlefield : 300,000 troops 30 divisions 631 artillery pieces	In the Changsha battlefield : 120,000 troops 46 battalions 326 artillery pieces

Casualties and losses
Main Battle : Ninth Military Front in the Changsha battlefield: 23,858 killed 35,220 wounded 11,594 missing Sixth Military Front in the Yichang offensive : 21,368 casualties Supporting Operations : Third Military Front : 5,678 killed or wounded 741 missing Fifth Military Front : 790 casualties Total : nearly 100,000 killed, wounded, or missing	Japanese data: 11th Army : (Note: including the Changsha, Yichang, Jiangnan, and Haoxue battlefields); 1,670 killed 5,184 wounded 14 missing 13th Army against the Third and Fifth Military Fronts in supporting fronts: From September 23 to September 30 : 25 killed 66 wounded; In October : 185 killed 353 wounded 3 missing

The (Second) Battle of Changsha (6 September – 8 October 1941; Chinese: 第二次長沙會戰) was Japan's second attempt at taking the city of Changsha, China, the capital of Hunan Province, as part of the Second Sino-Japanese War.

== Background ==
=== Japanese preparation ===
On December 2, 1940, the US congress passed a bill to provide a 100-million-dollar loan to China. On December 10, Britain also approved a 10-million-pound loan to China. Such a move was in response to the Japan's signing of the Tripartite Pact and moves to recognize Wang Jingwei's puppet government. In response, the Japanese army planned to resolve the 'China Incident' as soon as possible. On January 16, 1941, the Japanese army adopted the "Long-term Operational Guidance Plan for China", where they would not ease pressure but launched aggressive operations in the summer and autumn of 1941 while taking note of international situation and clearing occupied areas.

In April 1941, Lieutenant General Korechika Anami took over position as the commander of the 11th Army and began preparation for the Changsha operation. While they were working on plans for the offensive, Operation Barbarossa started on June 22, 1941, which disrupted the preparation of the operation as the China Expeditionary Army was considering redeploying units of the 11th Army in preparation for war with the Soviet Union. Nevertheless, Lieutenant General Anami approved the outline for the operational guidance of the Changsha Operation on June 24, planning to launch an offensive on September 15.

The objective of the operation was to "deal a major blow to the Ninth Military Front in order to thwart the enemy's plan for resistance." Japanese military leaders emphasized at every opportunity that the objective was not to "occupy the area" or "obtain supplies". The Japanese army judged that the enemy facing them totaled fifteen divisions from the 4th, 37th, 99th, 74th, and 26th Corps. Assuming that two infantry battalions were enough to fight against one enemy division but to prepare for a possible increase in enemy numbers, the Japanese army put forty-one infantry battalions in four divisions and three task forces and twenty-nine artillery battalions into the operation.

=== Chinese preparation ===
The Chinese army was well aware of the Kwantung Army's build-up in Northeast China in case of a war with the Soviet Union after the German invasion. They detected General Anami gathering four divisions totalling 120,000 troops for an invasion in Hunan. Since the battle of Shanggao in March 1941, the Ninth Military Front had ordered its troops to cooperate with the guerillas in the Hunan-Hubei-Jiangxi border region to harass the enemy and prepare for an offensive. Thirty-five divisions in thirteen armies in three army groups totalling 378,307 troops were gathered in Hunan, with the headquarters of the Ninth Military Front centered in Changsha. In August 1941, the Ninth Military Front judged that the enemy planned to capture Changsha and obtain supplies. The Chinese army planned to lure the Japanese army to the south of Miluo river and annihilate them there.

== Changsha battlefield ==
=== Fighting Around the Dayun Mountain ===
On September 7, the Japanese 6th Division launched a mopping-up operation at Dayun Mountain (大雲山) with air support from the east, west, and north. The Yanling (雁嶺) and Jianshan (尖山) positions fell on the same day and the defending 177th Regiment of the 59th Division and 306th Regiment of the 102nd Division of the 4th Corps and the 1st Battalion of the 33rd Regiment of the New 11th Division of the 58th Corps of the 27th Army Group were trapped in a desperate battle. On the same day, Yang Sen, commander of the 27th Army Group, ordered the New 10th Division and New 11th division of the 58th Corps to assist the Dayun Mountain defenders. On the 8th, the two divisions advanced towards Dayun Mountain followed by the 60th Division of the 37th Corps. For the next two days, the two sides fought fiercely for the mountain. On the 10th of September, the Shigematsu task force of the 40th Division arrived to replace the 6th Division at Dayun Mountain. The 6th Division mistakenly reported that the Dayun Mountain had been cleared off enemy troops to the task force. Thus, the task force was unprepared for the assault by the 59th, 60th, and New 10th Divisions. The task force struggled under the counterattack of the three divisions, and the Chinese army recaptured the peak of Dayun Mountain. At the same time, a portion of the 4th Corps also skirmished with the Japanese 3rd and 6th Divisions. After hearing about the unexpected battle encountered by the 40th Division, the 11th Army's headquarters ordered the Araki task force of the 33rd Division to reinforce the division while the army prepared for an offensive on September 18. On the way, the Araki task force encountered fierce resistance from the New 11th Division but was able to reach its position on the 18th. The 40th Division was also preparing for an offensive on the 18th. From September 14 until September 17, the division continued fighting fiercely against the Chinese New 10th Division, but after a week of fighting the engaged units of the Japanese division had suffered losses exceeding half. Seeing the build-up of the Japanese army north of Xinqiang River (新牆河), the Ninth Military Front ordered the 27th Army Group to withdraw from Dayun Mountain, which they gradually did on September 17 and 18. The Chinese army suffered more than 3,000 casualties in the battle.

=== All-out Offensive ===
On September 18, the Japanese army launched their offensive. The 6th Division forced a crossing at the Xinqiang River, breaking through the position of the 4th Corps at the south bank of the river and causing the corps to retreat to the mountains east of Guanwang Bridge (關王橋). Soon, the whole 11th Army was crossing the river. After hearing about the news, Yang Sen ordered the 133rd and 134th Divisions of the 20th Corps and the 58th Corps to block the enemy near Yanglin street (楊林街). On September 19, in the area east of the south bank of the Xinqiang river, the 40th Division encountered fierce resistance from the 59th and 90th Divisions of the 4th Corps and fought all day long with heavy losses on both sides.

On September 19, the 3rd, 4th, and 6th Divisions arrived at the north bank of the Miluo River. The 95th and 140th Divisions of the 37th Corps and the 92nd and 99th Divisions of the 99th Corps had been ordered to the south bank of the Miluo River on the 18th but before they had finished their deployment, the three Japanese divisions were already crossing the river and attacking the two corps. From 19 until 24 September, the two sides fought fiercely at the south bank and the Chinese positions were breached one after another. By the 25th, the two corps had to retreat. At the same time, the Japanese 6th division moved eastward along the Miluo River and clashed with the 44th Division of the 26th Corps. The corps immediately sent the 32nd and 41st Divisions to assist, but the 32nd Division was intercepted by the Japanese 3rd Division and retreated southward. The 6th Division quickly broke through the right and left flank of the 26th Corps and encircled the unit on the 23rd of September. On the 25th, the corps was ordered to break out and the remnants retreated to Genggutai (更鼓台) and Shiwan (石灣).

On 22 September, the 3rd Division, 190th Division, and 10th Reserve Division of the 10th Corps were ordered to occupy the Jinjing (金井)-Suqiao (粟橋) line. On the 24th, the corps was besieged by the Japanese 3rd, 4th, and 6th Divisions and the Hayabuchi task force. The 568th Regiment and the headquarters of the 190th Division trying to move southward were surrounded by the Japanese 3rd Division. During the break-out attempt, divisional commander Zhu Yue (朱岳) was wounded, deputy divisional commander Lai Chuanxiang (賴傳湘) was killed, and the division suffered heavy casualties. By the 26th, all defensive positions of the 10th Corps had been breached. Jinjing and Suqiao fell, and the 10th Corps suffered heavy casualties in the retreat. The remnants moved to the Langli City (榔梨市) south of Laodao River (撈刀河) for reorganization. By this point, Xue Yue's plan to destroy the Japanese army at the south bank of the Miluo River had failed.

=== Battle of Laodao River ===
Throughout the campaign, the 11th Army's headquarters had paid close attention to the movement of Wang Yaowu's 74th Corps. Unbeknownst to the Nationalists, the Japanese army had been able to intercept the telegraphs of the Chinese army. On the 21st of September, the headquarters were shocked to hear that the 74th Corps had begun moving to the battlefield. Since the Jiangxi-Hunan operation (known in China as the First Battle of Changsha), the 74th Corps had fought in several battles against the 11th Army, including the 1939-1940 Winter Offensive and the Battle of Shanggao, and was regarded by the 11th Army as an elite assault corps directly under the Nationalist Government. The appearance of the 74th Corps affected the operational plans of the Japanese army in Changsha, and the 6th Division was ordered to block the corps at the Laodao River and prevent it from reaching Changsha. On September 24, General Anami held a combat meeting, one of the main points being how to deal with the 74th Corps. General Anami hoped that they would be able to deal a heavy blow to the 74th Corps but eventually decided to focus on the original objective, having the 3rd and 4th Divisions continue their advance towards Changsha while the 6th Division was tasked with defeating the 74th Corps. On the 25th, the 11th Army headquarters received an intercepted telegraph from Xue Yue about the plan for a decisive battle north of Laodao River.

On the early morning of September 26, Hanaya's 29th Infantry Brigade of the 3rd Division sent the 3rd Battalion of the 18th Infantry Regiment forward to secure a crossing point for the Liuyang River (瀏陽河) near Jintan (金潭). To get there, the battalion would have to pass through the Chunhua Mountain (春華山) on the north bank of the Laodao River. At 8 a.m., the 10th Company of the 3rd Battalion was approaching the vicinity of Chunhua Mountain when it suddenly took fire. Because the area was covered by a small pine forest and the visibility was unclear, the company did not know where the bullets came from. Battalion commander Ikede, who judged the enemy were defeated stragglers, ordered the company to attack. As a result, the company continued fighting until the afternoon before they could make progress, and the battalion eventually had to cross the Laodao River after dark.

The enemy facing them were units of the 74th Corps. The 3rd Division had no prior knowledge of who they were fighting against at the time. While the 11th Army had been aware of the movement of the 74th Corps since September 21, the army did not know where the corps was heading. As the Chinese army was accustomed to rapid marches at night to avoid Japanese aircraft, the 74th Corps moved faster than the 11th Army had believed. On the afternoon of September 25, the 169th and 170th Regiments of the 57th Division were ordered to move northward through Huanghua City (黃花市) to seize the front-line positions of Chunhua Mountain at the north bank of Laodao River. At dawn of September 26, the 169th Regiment of the 57th Division encountered the vanguard of the Japanese army. At the same time, a portion of the 58th division also rushed to the eastern side of the mountain and the two units worked together to drive out the Japanese vanguard and seized key positions near Chunhua Mountain. By morning, most of the 57th and 58th Divisions had crossed the Laodao River. The 58th Division was ordered to take over the defense line of the 57th Division from the eastern side of Chunhua Mountain to Yong'an city (永安市).

Before noon, the 1st and 3rd Battalion of the 34th Infantry Regiment had arrived at the eastern side of Chunhua Mountain and launched an assault against the 173rd Regiment of the 58th Division. The 3rd Company of the 1st Battalion rushed forward and occupied Hill 153.3 and captured it by 15:25, but was immediately subjected to concentrated fire. The commander of the company was hit by a stray bullet and died the following day. In the afternoon, the 6th Infantry Regiment arrived at the western side of Chunhua Mountain which was defended by the 169th Regiment of the 57th Division. The regiment ordered its 2nd Battalion to launch an assault with heavy artillery support. For thirty minutes, the 6th and 7th Companies suffered continuous casualties under fierce gunfire from the defenders. The commander of the 6th Company was killed leading the 2nd Company to charge the defenders' right side. By 18:00, the 6th Company had occupied Chunhua Mountain.

On the afternoon of September 26, the main force of the 18th Infantry Regiment assaulted Yong'an city defended by the 172nd Regiment of the 58th Division. With only the 1st Battalion, the 4th Company crossed the Laodao River bridge built by the Chinese army and the battalion occupied the city at 15:30. During the assault, the battalion erroneously claimed to have captured Cai Renjie (蔡仁傑), commander of the 173rd Regiment of the 58th Division. As the 1st Battalion crossed the river, the 58th Division launched a counterattack from the west flank of the 18th Infantry Regiment, isolating the 3rd Division's command post. At this time, the 2nd Battalion caught up with the main force of the Japanese regiment and immediately repelled the Chinese counterattack by 17:00. Following the counterattack of the 2nd Battalion, the 3rd Division's command post entered Yong'an city at 19:00. That night, the main force of the 18th Infantry Regiment took advantage of capturing Yong'an city to attack Hill 147, but encountered fierce resistance.

The 6th Division had also been pursuing the 74th Corps after air intelligence spotted a large Chinese unit on September 25. On the night of September 26, the 3rd Battalion of the 23rd Infantry Regiment attacked and captured Hill 151.1. On the same day, the 4th Division and its subordinate the Hayabuchi task force were also advancing to the banks of the Laodao River, breaking through the left bank positions at night.

At the same time, Wang Yaowu ordered a massive counterattack with all three divisions against the Japanese troops in front of them. At 2 a.m. on the 27th, grenades were thrown everywhere and brutal hand-to-hand combat were carried out at the burning city of Yong'an. Both company commanders of the 1st Battalion of the 18th Infantry Regiment were killed, and the assault on the highland was halted. At this time, the 18th Infantry Regiment only had four infantry companies, so regimental commander Ishii requested the 8th Company return to the regiment and immediately assign it to the 1st Battalion. Battalion commander Moriwaki personally led a platoon of the 8th Company and launched an assault, capturing Hill 147 on 5 a.m. The 58th Division counterattacked a few more times but were repelled. At 6 a.m, Ishii ordered the 2nd Battalion to launched an assault at the northern plateau of Hill 156 with close artillery support. By the afternoon, the hill had been captured, but the 7th Company had lost all its officers including the company commander, and the casualties of the company reached more than 60. According to Anami's diary on October 15, the 29th Infantry Brigade of the 3rd Division suffered more than 800 casualties during the entire second battle of Changsha, of which the 18th Infantry Regiment lost 8 company commanders. Most of the losses occurred in the battles near Chunhua Mountain and Yong'an city.

The 58th Division was facing not only the 3rd Division but also the 23rd Infantry Regiment of the 6th Division in the Japanese counterattack, of which the defenders at Chunhua Mountain bore the brunt of the attack. The 172nd Regiment lost two battalion commanders. Yu Guanying (于冠英), commander of the 2nd Battalion, was killed and Guo Runchu (郭潤初), commander of the 3rd Battalion was wounded. All battalion commanders and company commanders of the 173rd Regiment were killed or wounded, and all regiments of the Chinese division were locked in a bitter battle.

The 51st and 57th Divisions were also facing great difficulties. The 170th Regiment of the 57th Division was hit hard on the left flank by the 6th Division during the morning counterattack. Divisional commander Yu Chengwan (zh:余程萬) ordered infantry commander Li Hanqing (李翰卿) to lead the main force of the 171st Regiment and the supplementary regiment to counterattack the enemy's flank at Chunhua Mountain. The attack force took fierce gunfire from Japanese troops and Li Hanqing was killed. At the same time, the 170th Regiment was attacked by a portion of the 3rd Division and repelled them at a great cost. In the continuous fighting that day, the 57th Division suffered nearly 3,000 casualties. The 51st Division's night attack was also halted. Regiment adjutant Zhu Bingqing (朱炳慶) of the 151st Regiment and many officers were killed in the Japanese counterattack.

On the morning of September 27, Chiang Kai-Shek sent a telegraph to the Ninth Military Front, which contained the message: "The Laodao River Operation is crucial to defending Changsha and the very survival of our nation. Anyone who fail to obey orders, hesitate to advance, or retreat without authorization will be summarily executed on the spot." However, the 74th Corps was in a very difficult situation by noon as it was pinned down by the 3rd, 4th, and 6th Divisions along the Laodao River. At 17:00, Wang Yaowu received a telegraph by Xue Yue, informing him that the plan was now to lure the enemy deeper into their territory and engaged the enemy at the area north of Liuyang River and ordered him to led his corps to Dongyang City (洞陽市) using the cover of the night. The 51st and 57th Divisions were able to withdraw without engaging the enemy. However, the 58th Division, which had to cover the other divisions' retreat and was the last to withdraw, fought fiercely against the enemy and suffered heavy casualties. The 95th Division of the 37th Corps and the 72nd Corps launched supporting operations to cover the retreat of the 10th and 74th Corps and also took in the retreating 26th Corps.

=== Capture of Changsha City and Withdrawal ===
On September 25, realizing that the enemy were quickly advancing towards the undefended Changsha, Xue Yue ordered the 98th Division of the 79th Corps of the Sixth Military Front from Changde and the 8th Provisional Division of the 2nd Provisional Corps of the Seventh Military Front from Guangdong to garrison the areas around Changsha. On the 27th of September, the Japanese 4th Division crossed the Liuyang River, clashed with the 98th Division, and entered the northeast corner of Changsha City on 17:00. On 22:00, the Hayabuchi task force entered Changsha. On the same day, some units of the 3rd Division, driven by its victory against the 74th Corps, rushed south to capture Zhuzhou (株洲) without orders, which General Anami eventually approved. After fighting for two days with the 8th Provisional Division of the 2nd Provisional Corps, the 3rd Division occupied Zhuzhou on September 29. On September 30, the 6th Provisional Division of the 79th Corps crossed the Xiang River and engaged the Japanese 4th Division in Changsha.

After occupying Changsha, the 11th Army believed that they had defeated the core units of the Ninth Military Front (74th, 37th, 26th, and 10th Corps). Thus, except for the Hirano task force which was ordered to attack the 92nd and 99th Divisions of the 99th Corps, most of the Japanese troops began its withdrawal from Changsha on October 1. Detecting the beginning of the withdrawal, Xue Yue pushed his troops to pursue the Japanese army aggressively, flanking and harassing the enemy. During the retreat, the Hayabuchi task force attached to the 4th Division was ambushed by the 98th Division at the north bank of the Laodao River, resulting in the deaths of the 1st and 2nd Battalion commanders. In addition, the 11th Company of the 61st Infantry Regiment, which had been left behind by the main force of the 4th Division, was surrounded east of Changsha on the 2nd. The 3rd Battalion had to turn back and the 1st Air Group dispatched 16 aircraft to rescue them around noon on the 3rd. By the 6th of October, the Japanese army had finished its withdrawal and the battlefield returned to the pre-battle condition.

== Yichang Offensive ==
=== Background ===
After learning that the Japanese army had crossed the Xinqiang river on September 18, Chiang Kai-Shek ordered the Sixth Military Front to use the opportunity to launched an offensive to recapture Yichang. The 20th and 33rd Army Groups were responsible for sabotage works at the Han-Yi highway. The River Defense Army was responsible with attacking Yichang and the 26th army group was responsible for supporting the attack. Starting on the 28th, the various army groups of the Sixth Military Front began their offensives.

=== Initial Chinese Offensive ===
==== Jingmen-Shashi Front ====
On September 28, the 348th Regiment of the 116th Division crossed the Yangtze River with the 390th Regiment of the 130th Division and the Dongting Lake guerilla detachment, advancing towards Bailuoji (白螺磯). On the same day, a portion of the 5th Provisional Division and 77th Division of the 73rd Corps and the main force of the 15th Division (originally part of the 73rd Corps, temporarily attached to the 8th Corps) and the 103rd Division of the 8th Corps also crossed the river near Haoxue (郝穴). On September 29, the 15th Division destroyed a portion of the Han-Yi highway and four bridges. At the same time, the 1st Honorary Division of the 8th Corps crossed the river. On October 1, a portion of the 390th Regiment attacked the Bailuoji Airport, but made no progress.

On September 29, the 59th Corps and 77th Corps of the 33rd Army Group began its operation, followed by the 39th Corps on September 30. For the next week, the three corps attacked garrison positions of the Japanese 39th Division while at the same time destroying bridges and communication facilities.

From October 2 until October 3, the 8th, 53rd, and 73rd Corps of the 20th Army Group continued attacking the 39th Division and sabotaging parts of the Han-Yi highway. On October 3, the 1st Honorary Division captured Zhuanqiao (磚橋). These sabotage works resulted in many communication lines being severed and paralyzing the command and communication functions of the 103rd Brigade of the Japanese 13th Division at Yaqueling (鴉鵲嶺). On October 5, the New 23rd Division and 43rd Division of the 87th Corps joined in the fighting.

==== Yixi Front ====
On September 28, the 121st and 185th Divisions of the 94th Corps and the 14th Regiment of the 5th Division of the 8th Corps assaulted the position of the 58th Infantry Regiment at Moji Mountain (磨鷄山). The two sides fought until midnight on the 30th. The Japanese side recorded an instance where dozens of Chinese soldiers broke into their position. When Japanese troops surrounded and prepared to capture them, all the Chinese soldiers committed suicide with grenades. The Chinese army would continue to launch tenacious assaults on the area, destroying a large number of the Japanese positions, but was unable to capture the area.

==== Longquanpu and Shuanglian Temple front ====
On September 28, Major Yoshio Yamamoto's 1st Battalion of the 65th Infantry Regiment received a report of the sighting of about 300 enemy soldiers near Songjiazu (宋家咀), and sent the 2nd Company to attack them. However, they were quickly besieged by the supplementary regiment of the 75th Corps. On September 29, the company broke through the encirclement and finally return to friendly lines at night. The supplementary regiment took advantage of their victory and attacked the battalion on September 30, but did not achieve any progress by the 1st of October. Thus, the regiment set up positions outside the position of the Japanese battalion to form an encirclement. On September 30, the 141st Division of the 32nd Corps attacked and occupied Wangjiawan (汪家灣). The next day, they attacked Fengbaoshan (豐寶山). Colonel Yoshio Tachibana, the commander of the 65th Infantry Regiment, judged that the Chinese army was not strong and ordered Yoshio Yamamoto to lead the 3rd and 4th Companies and two machine gun platoons to attack Xinjiayan (辛家岩), 3 kilometers north of Longquanpu. On the night of October 3, the Chinese army bombarded Sankongyan (三孔岩) on the west bank of the Linjiang Creek (臨江溪). For the next few days, the Japanese battalion held out against the 75th Corps. By October 9, they were in a stand-off with the 75th and 32nd Corps.

On September 29, the 75th Corps besieged the 3rd Battalion of the 65th Infantry Regiment at Dongyanbao (東煙包) and Xianren Fort (仙人砦). Major General Shibata, commander of the 103rd Brigade, quickly dispatched the 12th Company with an artillery gun and a radio squad. On the early morning of September 30, a portion of the 75th Corps attacked Shuanglian Temple (双蓮寺) by surprise and burned down some of the Japanese army's barracks and shelters. In the evening, Yoshikawa's 10th Company entered the Xianren Fort which was besieged by the 4th Reserve Division and 6th Division of the 75th Corps and rescued the garrison, but suffered 10 deaths including Lieutenant Yoshikawa and 66 wounded in the process. The remnants retreated to Shuanglian Temple and the Xianren Fort was captured by the 75th Corps. The situation on October 2 and 3 was calm, but on the 4th, the 4th Reserve Division and 6th Division concentrated artillery fire at the temple and repeatedly assaulted it. The Japanese battalion tenaciously resisted the attacks and held out for ten days against the 4th Reserve Division, 6th Division, and 13th Division.

==== Southern Front ====
On September 28, the 13th and 15th Regiments of the 5th Division of the 8th Corps crossed the Yangtze River. On September 30, the 15th Regiment of the 5th Division of the 8th Corps attacked Gulaobei (古老背), which was defended by 70-80 non-combat troops. Lieutenant Takayoshi Kushida, commander of the 2nd Company of the quartermasters, sent 48 troops to relieve the defenders but after suffering more than 20 killed or wounded, they had to retreat. The besieged troops in Gulaobei broke out on October 1, and the 15th Regiment occupied the position. A portion of the regiment then attacked Jizishan (鷄子山), but was hit by a counterattack and retreated. On the same day, three and a half companies from the 58th Infantry Regiment counterattacked Gulaobei, but the 15th Regiment stubbornly resisted their attack and no progress was made.

After hearing that Gulaobei had fallen, thus cutting off the road west of Tumenya (土門埡), the 13th Division sent the 13th Engineer Regiment to open up the road. However, when the unit reached the Yangcha Road (楊岔路), it was ambushed and eight of its troops were killed in action. From the 3rd until the 5th of October, the 13th Division counterattacked the 5th Division at Gulaobei and Tumenya, but was not able to recover the area. On the 5th, the 5th Division received an order from Wu Qiwei (吳奇偉), the commander of the River Defense Army, to leave its defensive position and assist in the siege of Yichang, being temporarily assigned to the 73rd Corps. On the night of October 5, the cavalry team (consisting of 130 troops) of the 13th Division was suddenly surrounded by the 15th Regiment at Leijiachong (雷家冲), and a brutal 7-hour hand-to-hand battle ensued.

==== Ciyun Temple Front ====
On October 2, the 76th Division captured Maogoudong (毛狗洞), the New 33rd Division assembled at the east of Jiangjia Temple (姜家廟), and the 9th Division was kept in reserve. At the same time, chief of staff Akinaga was inspecting the front-line positions of the 104th Infantry Regiment at the Ciyun Temple (慈雲寺) and found it to be weak in strength and had inadequate drinking water supply, equipment, and ammunition. On October 3, the 9th Division, which had not been engaged in fighting, was ordered to break into Yichang City, destroy the airport, and occupy the city on the evening of October 5. To support the division, various Chinese units launched assaults at the strongholds around Yichang. On October 4, the New 33rd Division and 76th Division of the 2nd Corps launched a frontal assault on the 2nd Battalion of the 104th Infantry Regiment. At the same time, the 9th Division began to move toward Yichang City.

On October 6, the 76th Division encircled and besieged the 6th Company at Fengbaoshan. The 10th Company was ordered to relieve the company, and during the ensuing combat the company commander was killed. One Mitsubishi Ki-15 was shot down by machine gun fire from the 76th Division while attempting to assist the Japanese troops. The Ueyama punitive team soon arrived and rescued the besieged troops, but suffered 6 killed and 53 wounded in the process.

=== Chinese attack towards Yichang ===
By the 4th of October, the Japanese 13th Division was suffering continuous casualties and was overstretched in its defense lines. With all infantry units engaged, the division had to organize a temporary garrison unit with 388 non-combat troops and lightly wounded soldiers from the division's headquarters. On the same day, an entertainment troupe from Asakusa, Tokyo, arrived to comfort the troops and initially participated in caring for the wounded and sick, but could not bear to witness the horrific wounds of the soldiers. Eventually, the troupe was also given weapon to defend Yichang.

Before dawn on October 6, the 9th Division of the 2nd Corps attacked and overran the Japanese position at Fengziling (蜂子嶺). The division pursued the retreating garrison to the Dongshan Temple (東山寺) in the eastern suburb of Yichang when the Japanese 2nd Artillery Company opened fire at them. However, the 9th Division made use of gaps and blind spots and broke into the Japanese positions with grenades, fighting hand-to-hand with the garrison. As casualties increase, Zentaro Suzuki, the garrison commander, ordered the artillery to fire at the rear of the Chinese army to avoid hitting his own men. Fierce fighting ensued all day and night. On the early morning of October 7, the 9th Division attacked the temple and engaged in a 5-hour grenade battle with the defenders. Some Chinese troops managed to break into the Japanese positions, but suffered heavy casualties under Japanese artillery fire and had to retreat again.

On the early morning of October 8, the 9th Division launched another attack. The division immediately captured Yandunbao, and only 5 of the defending Japanese platoon escaped. The division then captured the Dongyue Temple (東岳廟) north of Yandunbao and attacked the Dongshan Temple for a third time, but was intensively fired upon by artillery and the attack stalled once again. A platoon of the 9th Company of the Japanese army counterattacked the Dongyue Temple, but was stubbornly blocked by the 9th Division and suffered continuous casualties including the platoon commander. The 4th Company was added to assist in the assault and take in the dead and wounded. At the same time, the 185th Division of the 94th Corps organized a ranger team and occupied Gezhouba (葛洲壩) under the cover of the morning fog. The 13th Division was shocked by the sudden landing at the urban city of Yichang, and organized a company to assault them with the cooperation of aircraft and artillery. The team was surrounded and only more than 10 escaped.

In view of the desperate situation of the defenders in Dongshan Temple, Suzuki's 2nd Battalion of the 65th Infantry Regiment were dispatched to the east. On the way there on October 8, the battalion encountered stubborn resistance from the 5th Division near Tumenya. It decided to take a detour to avoid unnecessary battles and to reach Yichang as fast as possible. However, the dispatch of Suzuki's battalion left Yaqueling vulnerable. On October 8, the 77th Division of the 73rd Corps took the opportunity and attacked Yaqueling, and the 103rd Brigade was caught in a bitter battle. With the help of the 2nd Battalion of the 15th Independent Artillery Regiment, the situation improved for the Japanese brigade. From October 9 until October 10 at the Dangyang-Yaqueling-Yichang highway, the Chinese 6th Division damaged eighteen roads and severed four kilometers of electric wires.

On the early morning of October 9, the 9th Division launched another assault at Dongshan Temple with the strength of one battalion, aiming directly at the junction between the weapons maintenance unit and the administrative services squad. They quickly broke through the position of the 2nd Platoon at the left flank of the weapons maintenance unit. In the ensuing hand-to-hand combat, warrant officer Sato was killed. Taking advantage of the victory, the Chinese army rushed into the left flank of the Japanese army in the temple. Acting commander Second Lieutenant Takahashi led his squad to counterattack the Chinese army but was wounded. Hearing about the breakthrough, the division immediately sent Suzuki's battalion which had just arrived to join the battle. Soon, the Chinese army rushed into the position of the 1st Platoon. Second Lieutenant Sato led half of his platoon to bravely counterattack the enemy at the 2nd Platoon's position, but was killed in action. At midnight, Suzuki's battalion advanced rapidly and counterattacked the attacking Chinese army. With the help of the rear artillery, the Japanese battalion was able to secure the position. After the Chinese army retreated, the battalion found that the corpses of the Chinese dead were shaped in a pyramid with the company commander at the front and his men behind him. In the company commander's diary written the previous day, he wrote about his unlimited trust he has for his men and his determination to recapture Yichang by tomorrow on the 10th.

On the night of October 6, the 39th Division was ordered to assist the 13th Division in Yichang. Divisional commander Sumita immediately dispatched the 3rd Battalion of the 233rd Infantry Regiment. On the way there, the battalion was continuously attacked by Chinese units such as 77th Division of the 73rd Corps and the 5th Division, during which battalion commander Omori was badly wounded and replaced by the 9th Company commander. On the afternoon of October 9, after suffering dozens of casualties, the battalion arrived in Yichang. On October 8, Masayoshi Matsuzaki's 4th Company of the 65th Infantry Regiment was also ordered to reinforce Yichang. The company was attacked by a portion of the 32nd Corps on the way, making it difficult to advance. Faced with setbacks, Matsuzaki once contemplated suicide but by the night of October 9, the company had reached Yichang.

=== Later Chinese offensive ===
On October 10 at the Double Tenth Day, the Chinese army launched a general offensive at the areas around Yichang. Bloody fighting occurred on all fronts. The 53rd Corps assaulted Yueyang. The 8th Corps and the 73rd Corps attacked the areas around Shayang and Shashi. The 94th Corps repeatedly attacked the 58th Infantry Regiment at Moji Mountain. The 32nd Corps continued attacking Longquanpu. The 75th Corps attacked Shuanglian Temple. In the direction of the Ciyun Temple, the 75th Corps concentrated about 20 artillery guns and fired hundreds of rounds before launching a fierce charge.

At 2:30 a.m., the 2nd Corps concentrated mortars and artillery and bombarded the Japanese position at Dongshan Temple with unprecedented firepower. At 5:00 a.m., the 9th Division launched repeated attacks with four assault battalions from the 27th Regiment and broke through the defense positions three times. The assault battalions broke into the urban city of Yichang and engaged in street fighting. The Japanese army released a large amount of poison gas and then took the opportunity to counterattack, resulting in most of the assault troops to be killed, wounded, or poisoned and forcing them to retreat. The Chinese army recorded that by the end of the day, more than 500 had died from poison gas.

Under serious pressure from the Chinese army, Lieutenant General Uchiyama Eitaro ordered his chief of staff Akinaga to burn confidential documents and prepare a place for the divisional commander and his staff to commit suicide. After hearing about the intent of the 13th Division's staff to die, Lieutenant General Anami ordered an offensive at Yichang. The main force of the 39th Division and the Hayabuchi task force were tasked with rescuing the 13th Division. On October 11, the 39th Division prepared to launch the offensive. At this point, the 233rd Infantry Regiment engaged fiercely with the 39th Corps at Yuquan Temple (玉泉寺). However, most of the Chinese army were already evacuating from Yichang that day. Due to heavy rain, the Chinese army's offensive on all fronts were frustrated by the muddy terrain. Coupled with reports since October 9 of Japanese reinforcements rushing towards Yichang, Chen Cheng ordered his army to retreat. On October 11, Chen Cheng reported that various units had been hit by poison gas the previous day. After hearing about the situation, Chiang Kai-Shek ordered a stop to the offensive. On October 11 and October 12, the 3rd Air Group dropped a large number of bombs on the retreating Chinese army.

The Linghekou (嶺河口) garrison had been besieged by the 1st Honorary Division of the 8th Corps and the 5th Provisional Division of the 73rd Corps since October 2. On October 8, Kajiura's regiment attempted to help the garrison but was unable to relieve them due to stubborn Chinese resistance. For fifteen days the garrison was encircled until October 17 when the Chinese army retreated. Afterwards, the Japanese army concentrated portions of the 4th Division, 39th Division, and 18th Independent Mixed Brigade to sweep the area, finishing the operation by October 26.

== Result ==
=== Chinese army's view ===
The Ninth Military Front suffered 70,672 killed, wounded, or missing and claimed that the Japanese army suffered 20,830 killed, 34,991 wounded, and 263 captured. However, they only released the names of 16 captured soldiers (excluding those who died of their wounds). In the Yichang offensive, the Sixth Military Front suffered 21,368 casualties and claimed 6,422 Japanese soldiers killed or wounded and 23 Japanese soldiers captured. The Chinese army assessed that the Japanese army had great speed and courage in its attack and withdrawal, advancing 130 kilometers in 11 days akin to a Blitzkrieg and retreating 12 kilometers a day which caught the Chinese army off-guard. The Chinese army also found that the Japanese army had excellent combined arms, training, and commando tactics in the battle. The Chinese army admitted that they had failed in their original plan to destroy the Japanese army at the area south of Miluo River, resulting in the 26th, 37th, 10th, and 74th Corps being defeated one by one. In the Changsha and Yichang battlefield, the Chinese army had a lack of artillery firepower, resulting in the Sixth Military Front not being able to recapture Yichang and suffering more than 20,000 casualties despite outnumbering the enemy ten to one. However, the Chinese army claimed to have caused the enemy heavy casualties and captured a lot of spoils. Moreover, they believed their gains in terms of international opinions and morale had been significant.

The Ninth Military Front was hit hard in this battle, especially its elite units. The 10th Corps suffered 8,768 casualties, the 4th Corps suffered 10,373 casualties, the 37th Corps suffered 14,015 casualties, and the 74th Corps, as the main target of the offensive, suffered 14,521 casualties. The 58th Division in particular lost nearly all of its combat troops, with 6,192 casualties out of its 11,907 troops. The casualties of the four corps amounted to roughly two-thirds of the total losses of the thirteen corps and various artillery, engineer, and guerilla units of the Ninth Military Front which participated in the battle.

Chiang Kai-Shek criticized Xue Yue for the fall of Changsha, saying, "In the evening of September 27, the enemy captured Changsha because Xue Boling (Yue) withdrew his headquarters to Lukou without authorization, allowing the enemy to sneak into the city. It was not until the night of the 29th when Xia Chuzhong's corps crossed the river from Yuelu Mountain, attacked Changsha and met enemy resistance, that we confirmed enemy troops had already occupied the city. Meanwhile, our high command was so cowardly that they violated every military principles during their move. This is extremely distressing and is a strange phenomenon that has never happened since the establishment of the National Revolutionary Army."

Later on during the third Nanyue military conference (第三次南嶽軍事會議) from October 16 until October 21, 1941, Chiang Kai-Shek again reprimanded the Ninth Military Front, criticizing his generals for their mindset of defending key cities with massive outlying fortifications that had to be defended by at least two or three divisions while the central point was barely fortified or defended. Chiang Kai-Shek believed that with this outdated thinking, "the enemy can attack any particular point if they so choose to. If they want to occupy Changsha, they can do so. They can broadcast the exact time of their advance and withdrawal, and they will still implement their scheduled plan without delay. Generals, what a disgrace this is!", a sentiment which General Zhang Fakui believed in for the whole war. Chiang Kai-Shek also criticized the indecisiveness and cowardice of his generals when facing the enemy, lamenting that "like in this battle of Changsha; when the enemy advanced, we were unable to resist; when the enemy retreated, we were unable to pursue. In several battles, we were unable to capture even one enemy. This situation is not only a major lesson for us, but is also a great disgrace! It proves that all our capabilities, knowledge, and spirit are insufficient and have all regressed!" and "in this battle of Changsha, we have such a strong force and such favorable conditions. We can definitely defeat the enemy, capture many enemy prisoners, and seize countless enemy weapons! Even if we cannot capture ten thousand prisoners, we should at least capture a thousand! If not a thousand, then at least a hundred! If not even a hundred, at the very least, there should be ten prisoners! But now, you don't even have ten prisoners! How can you be worthy of your responsibilities?!"

=== Japanese army's view ===
The Changsha operation was enthusiastically promoted by Lieutenant General Anami. However, before it could be carried out, there were repeatedly discussions over cancelling it. Thus, the operation was changed into a short-team operation and the strategy turned to encirclement. After defeating the 74th Corps, the 11th Army considered their operational objective a success. Some units also entered Changsha but was not allowed to remain in the city for long due to the shortening of the operation period. As a result, the 11th Army was able to achieve its objective but only caused limited damage on the Chinese army. The Chinese army's counterattack at Yichang also showed their still high morale and the grand scale of their operation.

In the operation, the Japanese 11th Army suffered 1,670 killed, 5,184 wounded, and 14 missing, including 1,212 killed, 3,760 wounded, and 14 missing in the Changsha battlefield and 401 killed and 1,256 wounded in the Yichang Counter-Offensive. They claimed the Chinese army left behind 54,000 corpses and 4,300 prisoners. The 65th Infantry Regiment of the Japanese 13th Division in particular suffered serious casualties, with 213 killed in action according to the military history compiled by war veterans of the regiment after the war. On 18 October, the regiment received 252 replacement transport troops; on 31 December, it received another 13 replacement officers and officer cadets; on 12 January of the following year, another 219 replacement infantrymen arrived; and on 4 April, the regiment received a further group of replacement personnel of unknown number.

The Chinese propaganda had an impact on Lieutenant General Anami. On November 23, 1941, the general heard someone within the headquarters saying that the Second Battle of Changsha only served as material for the enemy's propaganda, which made him feel dissatisfied. On December 13, the headquarters of the 11th Army talked about reports of the Chinese 2nd Provisional Corps and the 4th Corps moving southward for a possible offensive at Guangdong after the Battle of Hong Kong. The 11th Army considered another offensive at Changsha to stop the Chinese's southern movement, which General Anami immediately approved. Preparations for the Changsha offensive were thus inadequate as the operation was decided on the spur of the moment, which would result in the 3rd and 6th Divisions' defeat in the Third Battle of Changsha.

== Aftermath ==
In the third Nanyue military conference, Chiang Kai-Shek announced that Liao Lingqi (廖齡奇), the commander of the 58th Division, was to be executed for deserting in the battlefield. Reportedly during the meeting, Xue Yue singled him out as the general who was arrogant and disobeyed orders. Liao Lingqi was indignant and directly sought out Chiang Kai-Shek during recess. He continued to follow Chiang Kai-Shek while shouting "Report!" despite being told to leave, causing Chiang Kai-Shek to order him to be detained. After the meeting, Liao Lingqi was sentenced to death and to be executed immediately. He was shot on October 22. Before his death, he wrote three final notes for his family. After hearing about his execution, the men of his division were outraged. Wang Boxiong (王伯雄), the commander of the 172nd Regiment, Deng Zhuxiu (鄧竹修), the commander of the 174th Regiment, and He Lan (何瀾), the commander of the supplementary regiment, all resigned in protest for his execution. Zhang Lingfu, by then the deputy commander of the 58th Division, was promoted to divisional commander and Cai Renjie, the commander of the 173rd Regiment, was promoted to deputy divisional commander. The 58th Division underwent a three-month-long reorganization and was specifically excluded from participating in the Third Battle of Changsha. The last three notes written by Liao Lingqi were sent to Chiang Kai-Shek. After reading the notes and hearing the protests of the men of the 58th division, Chiang Kai-Shek rehabilitated Liao Lingqi, ordered an annual pension for his family, and had his body enshrined in the Nanyue Martyrs Shrine.

Li Yutang, the commander of the 10th Corps, was dismissed and was set to be replaced by Zhong Bin (鍾彬). However, the Third Battle of Changsha started before Zhong Bin took up post and Li Yutang was reinstated as commander of the corps, playing a key role in defending the urban city.

== See also ==
- Battle of Changsha (1939)
- Battle of Changsha (1941–1942)
- Battle of Changsha (1944)
- Battle of Changsha (TV series), the TV series depicting this event
