= Heisuke Abe =

Imperial Japanese officer

- 阿部 平輔
- Born: December 18, 1886; Miyagi Prefecture, Japan
- Died: June 11, 1943 (aged 56); Wewak, New Guinea
- Military career
- Allegiance: Empire of Japan
- Branch: Imperial Japanese Army
- Service years: 1909–1943
- Rank: Lieutenant General
- Commands: 41st Division
- Conflicts: World War II
- Awards: Order of the Golden Kite 3rd Class

Lieutenant General Heisuke Abe (阿部 平輔, Abe Heisuke; December 18, 1886 – June 11, 1943) was a senior officer in the Imperial Japanese Army during World War II. He was the Commandant of Cadets at the Komamoto Army Training School between 1934 and 1936, before being posted as the Commanding Officer Noncommissioned Officer Candidates Kwantung Army. He was the Commanding Officer of the 20th Depot Division when war broke out and was the Commanding Officer of the 41st Division in New Guinea in 1942. He died of illness, presumed to be Dracunculiasis at Wewak in September 1943.

== Military career ==
From	To	Appointment
DD.MM.1907	27.05.1909	Military Academy
18.03.1933	05.03.1934	4th Depot Guards Infantry Regiment
05.03.1934	01.12.1936	Commandant of Cadets, Komamoto Army Training School
01.12.1936	19.02.1938	Commanding Officer Noncommissioned Officer Candidates Kwantung Army
19.02.1938	25.03.1938	Attached to Kwantung Army Headquarters
25.03.1938	05.12.1938	2nd Sector 8th Border Garrison Unit Commander
25.12.1938	01.08.1939	8th Border Defence Unit Commander
01.08.1940	13.07.1941	Commandant of Morioka Army Reserve Officers' Cadet School
28.07.1941	01.07.1942	20th Depot Division Commander
01.07.1942	11.06.1943	41st Division Commander, New Guinea
11.06.1943	–	Dead of disease

== Ranks Promotions ==
Date of Award	Military Rank
25.12.1909	2nd Lieutenant
02.03.1926	Major
01.08.1931	Lieutenant Colonel
01.08.1935	Colonel
10.12.1938	Major General
25.08.1941	Lieutenant General
