= Battle of South Henan =

Battle

Coordinates: 33.8333°N 113.5000°E

- Part of the Second Sino-Japanese War
Date	January 30 – March 1, 1941 (1 month and 1 day)
Location	Southern part of Henan province in the Republic of China
Result	Both sides claimed victory.

Belligerents
(Republic of China (1912–1949)) Republic of China	Empire of Japan

Commanders and leaders
(Republic of China (1912–1949)) Li Zongren	(Empire of Japan) Waichiro Sonobe

Strength
5th War Area: 2nd, 31st, 33rd Army Groups, 2nd Army, 36th Corps, 15th Separate Brigade, 14th Artillery Regiment, 4th Separate Engineer Battalion	11th Army: 3rd, 4th, 15th, 17th, 39th, 40th Divisions, 18th Independent Mixed Brigade, 3 Tank Regiments, 1 Separate Heavy Artillery Regiment, 100 Planes North China Area Army: 35th Division (centered on the 4th Cavalry Brigade)

Casualties and losses
Chinese claim (January 23 to February 24, 1941) : 7,085 killed 6,885 wounded 3,576 missing Japanese claim : 11th Army's claim : 5,050 killed 175 captured	Chinese claim : 9,000 killed and wounded Japanese claim : 11th Army (February 1941) : 102 killed 285 wounded; 35th Division : 38 killed 41 wounded

The Battle of South Henan (simplified Chinese: 豫南会战; traditional Chinese: 豫南會戰; pinyin: Yùnán Huìzhàn), was one of the 22 major engagements between the National Revolutionary Army (NRA) and Imperial Japanese Army during the Second Sino-Japanese War. This battle was the first time the NRA engaged the Japanese in southern Henan.

In January 1941, the Japanese 11th Army split into three routes to attack the Chinese positions. Their main objective was to eradicate Chinese control of the Ping-Han Railway's southern section. Li Zongren, commander of the Chinese 5th War Area, avoided frontal contact with the Japanese as much as possible. Instead, he fought conservatively, diverting his main forces towards the two flanks. Outflanked, the Japanese retreated after taking heavy casualties, and their attack was repelled.

The Japanese Army recorded that the main objective was to force Tang Enbo's troops, which according to Japanese intelligence was moving to suppress the New Fourth Army, into a decisive battle. The Japanese Army was aware of the Fifth War Zone's intent to avoid direct battles with the Japanese as was the case with the Central Hubei Operation and had adjusted their battle plan of action accordingly. The Eleventh Army claimed to have achieved their objective of defeating Tang Enbo's group army by January 30 and the Japanese 3rd Division also captured Nanyang, the communication center of the Chinese participating units, on February 4 after obtaining the approval of Eleventh Army headquarters. In total, the Japanese Army reported engaging approximately 95,000 Chinese troops and claimed to have inflicted approximately 16,000 losses while suffering minor losses. This operation was highly praised by the General Headquarters of the China Expeditionary Army as a model example that was worth emulating for future campaigns.

== See also ==
- Order of Battle: Battle of South Henan
