= Seventh Area Army =

Field army of the Japanese Empire and its occupied regions

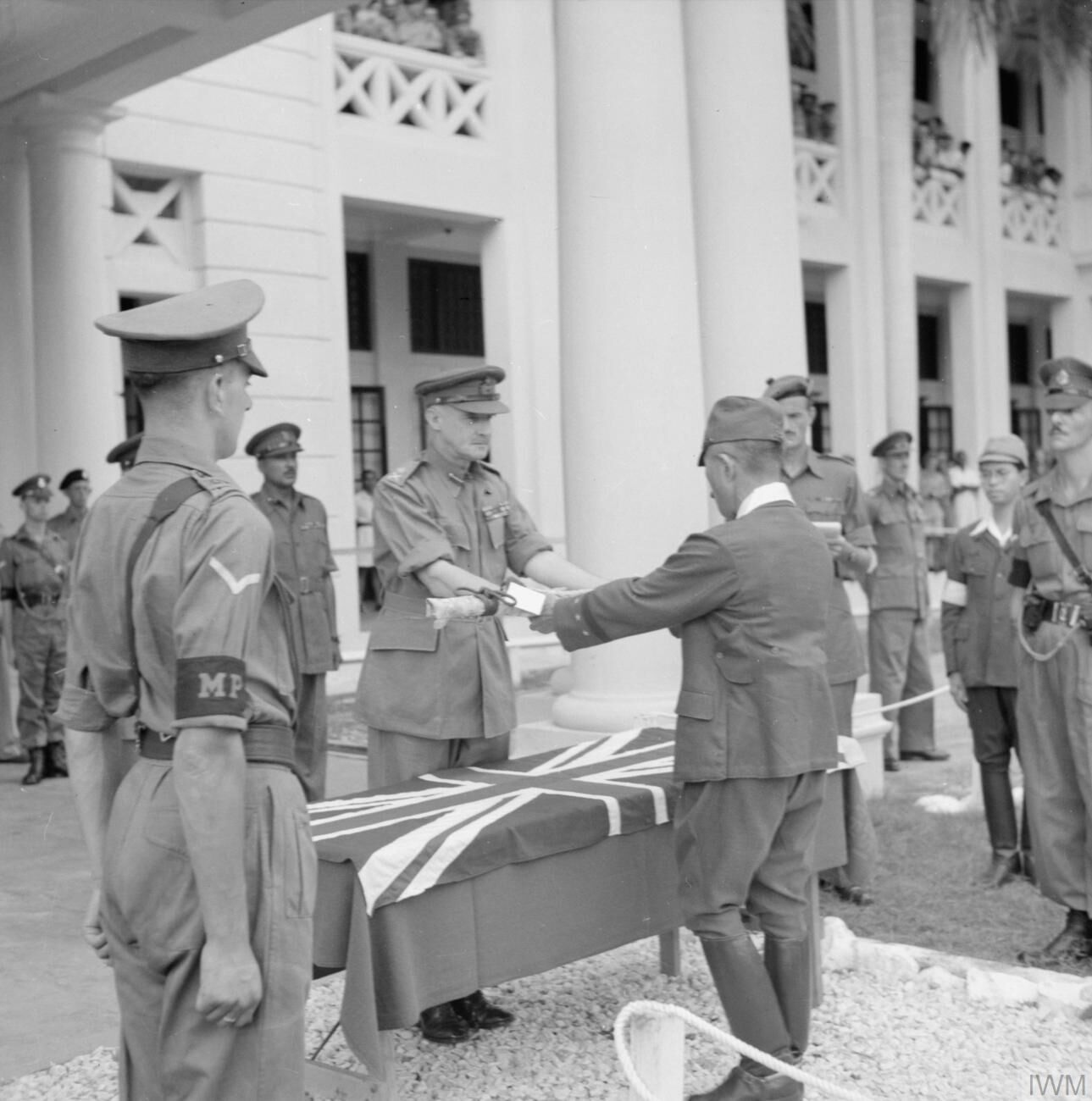
- General F W Messervy receives the sword of General Itagaki
- Active: March 19, 1944 - August 15, 1945
- Country: Empire of Japan
- Branch: Imperial Japanese Army
- Type: Infantry
- Role: Field Army
- Garrison/HQ: Singapore
- Nickname(s): 岡 (Oka = "hill")
- Engagements: Borneo campaign (1945); Operation Tiderace

The Seventh Area Army (第7方面軍, Dai nana hōmen gun) was a field army of the Imperial Japanese Army formed during final stages of the Pacific War and based in Japanese-occupied Malaya, Singapore and Borneo, Java, and Sumatra.

== History ==
The Japanese 7th Area Army was formed on March 19, 1944 under the Southern Expeditionary Army Group for the specific task of opposing landings by Allied forces in Japanese-occupied Malaya, Singapore and Borneo, Java, Sumatra and to consolidate a new defense line after the loss of the Solomon Islands, New Guinea and eastern portions of the Netherlands East Indies. It had its headquarters at Singapore.

The units initially assigned to the Area Army were the 16th, 25th and 29th Army's. Units stationed in Borneo were also transferred to the Area Army's control.

The Army was demobilized at Singapore on the surrender of Japan at the end of World War II.

== List of Commanders ==
=== Commanding officer ===
	Name	From	To
1	General Kenji Doihara	22 March 1944	7 April 1945
2	General Seishirō Itagaki	7 April 1945	15 August 1945

=== Chief of Staff ===
	Name	From	To
1	Major General Tsunenori Shimizu	22 March 1944	27 June 1944
2	Lieutenant General Kitsuju Ayabe	27 June 1944	15 August 1945
