= Army groups of the National Revolutionary Army =

World War II Chinese army groups

Flag of the National Revolutionary Army

The army groups (Chinese: 集團軍, also translated as group armies) of the National Revolutionary Army were the largest conventional mobile formations in the organization of the army of the Republic of China during the Second Sino-Japanese War. The first army groups were established immediately after the Japanese attack at Marco Polo Bridge on 7 July 1937, and new army groups continued to be formed throughout the war.

During the war, the only military formations larger than the army group were the military regions, which were defined by geographical boundaries, and the army corps, of which only four were formed and only during the Battle of Wuhan. In effect, the army group was the largest fighting unit of the National Revolutionary Army, and usually exercised command over two or more field armies or several corps, and assorted lesser units. They were roughly equivalent in size to an Army in British or American military terminology. By the end of the war with Japan, 40 army groups of China were in existence. The civil war saw three additional army groups being formed, even as they were gradually being replaced by newly formed army corps, by then a largely analogous formation. The following list provides an overview of the army groups in the National Revolutionary Army, including their organization, commanders, and important battles.

== 1st to 10th army groups ==
Commanders killed in action are denoted by †

Unit	Organization	Commanders	Duration	Major battles
1st Army Group 第一集團軍	Established: Aug 1937; Disbanded: Apr 1938	Song Zheyuan 宋哲元	Aug 1937 – Apr 1938	Tianjin–Pukou Railway Operation; Battle of Northern and Eastern Henan
1st Army Group 第一集團軍	Reestablished: Oct 1938; Reorganized into 1st Army Corps: Sep 1947	Long Yun 龍雲	Oct 1938 – Jan 1939	None
1st Army Group 第一集團軍	Reestablished: Oct 1938; Reorganized into 1st Army Corps: Sep 1947	Lu Han 盧漢	Jan 1939 – Mar 1945	Battle of Nanchang; First Battle of Changsha; 1939–40 Winter Offensive; Second Battle of Changsha; Third Battle of Changsha; Battle of Zhejiang-Jiangxi; Battle of West Hubei; Battle of Changde
1st Army Group 第一集團軍	Reestablished: Oct 1938; Reorganized into 1st Army Corps: Sep 1947	Sun Du 孫渡	Mar 1945 – Sep 1947	None
2nd Army Group 第二集團軍	Established: Sep 1937; Reorganized into 4th Pacification Area: Oct 1945	Liu Zhi 劉峙	Sep 1937 – Feb 1938	Beiping–Hankou Railway Operation; Battle of Taiyuan
2nd Army Group 第二集團軍	Established: Sep 1937; Reorganized into 4th Pacification Area: Oct 1945	Sun Lianzhong 孫連仲	Feb 1938 – Aug 1943	Battle of Taierzhuang; Battle of Suixian–Zaoyang; 1939–40 Winter Offensive; Battle of Zaoyang–Yichang; Battle of South Henan; Second Battle of Changsha; Battle of West Hubei
2nd Army Group 第二集團軍	Established: Sep 1937; Reorganized into 4th Pacification Area: Oct 1945	Liu Ruming 劉汝明	Aug 1943 – Oct 1945	Battle of Changde; Battle of West Henan–North Hubei
3rd Army Group 第三集團軍	Established: Sep 1937; Disbanded:Mar 1943	Han Fuju 韓復榘	Sep 1937 – Jan 1938	Tianjin–Pukou Railway Operation
3rd Army Group 第三集團軍	Established: Sep 1937; Disbanded:Mar 1943	Yu Xuezhong 于學忠	Jan 1938 – Jun 1938	Battle of Xuzhou
3rd Army Group 第三集團軍	Established: Sep 1937; Disbanded:Mar 1943	Sun Tongxuan 孫桐萱	Jun 1938 – Feb 1943	Battle of Wuhan; 1939–40 Winter Offensive; Battle of South Henan
3rd Army Group 第三集團軍	Established: Sep 1937; Disbanded:Mar 1943	Zhang Xuezhong 張雪中	Feb 1943 – Mar 1943	None
3rd Army Group 第三集團軍	Reestablished: Sep 1943; Disbanded: Nov 1946	Li Tiejun 李鐵軍	Sep 1943 – Feb 1944	None
3rd Army Group 第三集團軍	Reestablished: Sep 1943; Disbanded: Nov 1946	Zhao Shoushan 趙壽山	Feb 1944 – Nov 1946	None
4th Army Group 第四集團軍	Established: Sep 1937; Disbanded: Mar 1947	Jiang Dingwen 蔣鼎文	Sep 1937 – Feb 1939	Battle of Shanghai
4th Army Group 第四集團軍	Established: Sep 1937; Disbanded: Mar 1947	Sun Weiru 孫蔚如	Feb 1939 – Jun 1945	1939–40 Winter Offensive; Battle of South Shanxi; Battle of Central Henan; Battle of West Henan–North Hubei
4th Army Group 第四集團軍	Established: Sep 1937; Disbanded: Mar 1947	Li Xingzhong 李興中	Jun 1945 – Mar 1947	None
5th Army Group 第五集團軍	Established: Sep 1937; Disbanded: Mar 1942	Gu Zhutong 顧祝同	Sep 1937 – Jun 1938	Battle of Shanghai
5th Army Group 第五集團軍	Established: Sep 1937; Disbanded: Mar 1942	Yu Xuezhong 于學忠	Jun 1938 – Feb 1939	None
5th Army Group 第五集團軍	Established: Sep 1937; Disbanded: Mar 1942	Zeng Wanzhong 曾萬鐘	Feb 1939 – Mar 1942	1939–40 Winter Offensive; Battle of South Shanxi
5th Army Group 第五集團軍	Reestablished: Jan 1943; Disbanded: Apr 1945	Du Yuming 杜聿明	Jan 1943 – Apr 1945	None
6th Army Group 第六集團軍	Established: Sep 1937; Reorganized into 10th Army Corps: Nov 1948	Yang Aiyuan 楊愛源	Sep 1937 – Mar 1939	Battle of Taiyuan
6th Army Group 第六集團軍	Established: Sep 1937; Reorganized into 10th Army Corps: Nov 1948	Chen Changjie 陳長捷	Mar 1939 – Jan 1941	1939–40 Winter Offensive
6th Army Group 第六集團軍	Established: Sep 1937; Reorganized into 10th Army Corps: Nov 1948	Yang Aiyuan 楊愛源	Jan 1941 – Jan 1946	None
6th Army Group 第六集團軍	Established: Sep 1937; Reorganized into 10th Army Corps: Nov 1948	Wang Jingguo 王靖國	Jan 1946 – Nov 1948	None
7th Army Group 第七集團軍	Established: Sep 1937; Reorganized into Shanxi Guerrilla Corps Command: May 1948	Fu Zuoyi 傅作義	Sep 1937 – Mar 1939	Battle of Taiyuan
7th Army Group 第七集團軍	Established: Sep 1937; Reorganized into Shanxi Guerrilla Corps Command: May 1948	Zhao Chengshou 趙承綬	Mar 1939 – May 1948	1939–40 Winter Offensive
8th Army Group 第八集團軍	Established: Sep 1937; Disbanded: Jul 1938	Zhang Fakui 張發奎	Sep 1937 – Jul 1938	None
8th Army Group 第八集團軍	Reestablished: Feb 1939; Reorganized into 15th Army Corps: Nov 1948	Sun Chu 孫楚	Feb 1939 – Nov 1948	Battle of South Shanxi
9th Army Group 第九集團軍	Established: Sep 1937; Disbanded: Jan 1938	Zhang Zhizhong 張治中	Sep 1937 – Oct 1937	Battle of Shanghai
9th Army Group 第九集團軍	Established: Sep 1937; Disbanded: Jan 1938	Zhu Shaoliang 朱紹良	Oct 1937 – Dec 1937	None
9th Army Group 第九集團軍	Established: Sep 1937; Disbanded: Jan 1938	Gu Zhutong 顧祝同	Dec 1937 – Jan 1938	None
9th Army Group 第九集團軍	Reestablished: Aug 1938; Disbanded: Mar 1945	Wu Qiwei 吳奇偉	Aug 1938 – Jul 1940	Battle of Wuhan; 1939–40 Winter Offensive
9th Army Group 第九集團軍	Reestablished: Aug 1938; Disbanded: Mar 1945	Miao Peinan 繆培南	Jul 1940 – Jul 1941	None
9th Army Group 第九集團軍	Reestablished: Aug 1938; Disbanded: Mar 1945	Guan Linzheng 關麟徵	Jul 1941 – Mar 1945	None
10th Army Group 第十集團軍	Established: Jan 1937; Downsized into 19th Corps: Mar 1946	Liu Jianxu 劉建緒	Jan 1937 – Aug 1941	Battle of Shanghai; 1939–40 Winter Offensive
10th Army Group 第十集團軍	Established: Jan 1937; Downsized into 19th Corps: Mar 1946	Wang Jingjiu 王敬玖	Aug 1941 – Dec 1945	Second Battle of Changsha; Battle of Zhejiang-Jiangxi; Battle of West Hubei; Battle of Changde; Battle of West Hunan
10th Army Group 第十集團軍	Established: Jan 1937; Downsized into 19th Corps: Mar 1946	Ou Zhen 歐震	Dec 1945 – Mar 1946	None

== 11th to 20th army groups ==
Unit	Organization	Commanders	Duration	Major battles
11th Army Group 第十一集團軍	Established: Sep 1937; Disbanded: Sep 1940	Li Pinxian 李品仙	Sep 1937 – Oct 1939	Battle of Xuzhou; Battle of Wuhan
11th Army Group 第十一集團軍	Established: Sep 1937; Disbanded: Sep 1940	Xia Wei 夏威	Oct 1939 – Nov 1939	None
11th Army Group 第十一集團軍	Established: Sep 1937; Disbanded: Sep 1940	Huang Qixiang 黃琪翔	Nov 1939 – Sep 1940	1939–40 Winter Offensive
11th Army Group 第十一集團軍	Reestablished: Nov 1941; Disbanded: Mar 1945	Song Xilian 宋希濂	Nov 1941 – Sep 1944	Battle of Yunnan-Burma Road; Battle of Northern Burma and Western Yunnan
11th Army Group 第十一集團軍	Reestablished: Nov 1941; Disbanded: Mar 1945	Huang Chieh 黃杰	Sep 1944 – Mar 1945	Battle of Northern Burma and Western Yunnan; Second Burma Expedition
12th Army Group 第十二集團軍	Established: Dec 1937; Reorganized into Quzhou Pacification Bureau: Oct 1945	Yu Hanmou 余漢謀	Dec 1937 – Oct 1945	Battle of Canton; 1939–40 Winter Offensive
13th Army Group 第十三集團軍	Established: Feb 1939; Disbanded: Jan 1946	Wang Jingguo 王靖國	Feb 1939 – Jan 1946	None
14th Army Group 第十四集團軍	Established: Sep 1937; Disbanded: Jul 1944	Wei Lihuang 衛立煌	Sep 1937 – Oct 1939	Battle of Taiyuan
14th Army Group 第十四集團軍	Established: Sep 1937; Disbanded: Jul 1944	Liu Mao'en 劉茂恩	Oct 1939 – Jul 1944	1939–40 Winter Offensive; Battle of South Shanxi; Battle of Central Henan
15th Army Group 第十五集團軍	Established: Sep 1937; Disbanded: Jul 1940	Chen Cheng 陳誠	Sep 1937 – Nov 1937	Battle of Shanghai
15th Army Group 第十五集團軍	Established: Sep 1937; Disbanded: Jul 1940	Luo Zhuoying 羅卓英	Nov 1937 – Dec 1937	None
15th Army Group 第十五集團軍	Established: Sep 1937; Disbanded: Jul 1940	Chen Cheng 陳誠	Dec 1937 – May 1939	Battle of Wuhan; First Battle of Changsha
15th Army Group 第十五集團軍	Established: Sep 1937; Disbanded: Jul 1940	Xue Yue 薛岳	May 1939 – Oct 1939	None
15th Army Group 第十五集團軍	Established: Sep 1937; Disbanded: Jul 1940	Guan Linzheng 關麟徵	Oct 1939 – Jul 1940	1939–40 Winter Offensive
15th Army Group 第十五集團軍	Reestablished: May 1941; Disbanded: Oct 1945	He Zhuguo 何柱國	May 1941 – Oct 1945	Second Battle of Changsha; Battle of Central Henan
16th Army Group 第十六集團軍	Established: Jan 1939; Disbanded: Mar 1945	Xia Wei 夏威	Jan 1939 – Nov 1939	None
16th Army Group 第十六集團軍	Established: Jan 1939; Disbanded: Mar 1945	Cai Tingkai 蔡廷鍇	Nov 1939 – Nov 1939	Battle of South Guangxi
16th Army Group 第十六集團軍	Established: Jan 1939; Disbanded: Mar 1945	Xia Wei 夏威	Nov 1939 – Mar 1945	Battle of Guilin–Liuzhou
17th Army Group 第十七集團軍	Established: Nov 1937; Disbanded: Oct 1945	Ma Hongkui 馬鴻逵	Nov 1937 – Oct 1945	Battle of West Suiyuan
18th Army Group 第十八集團軍	Established: Sep 1937; Mutinied to form People's Liberation Army: from Sep 1946 to early 1947	Zhu De 朱德	Sep 1937 – early 1947	Battle of Pingxingguan; Hundred Regiments Offensive
19th Army Group 第十九集團軍	Established: Sep 1937; Disbanded: Oct 1942	Xue Yue 薛岳	Sep 1937 – Jan 1938	Battle of Shanghai
19th Army Group 第十九集團軍	Established: Sep 1937; Disbanded: Oct 1942	Luo Zhuoying 羅卓英	Jan 1938 – Apr 1942	Battle of Wuhan; Battle of Nanchang; First Battle of Changsha; 1939–40 Winter Offensive; Battle of Shanggao; Second Battle of Changsha; Third Battle of Changsha
19th Army Group 第十九集團軍	Established: Sep 1937; Disbanded: Oct 1942	Liu Yinggu 劉膺古	Apr 1942 – Jul 1942	None
19th Army Group 第十九集團軍	Established: Sep 1937; Disbanded: Oct 1942	Luo Zhuoying 羅卓英	Jul 1942 – Oct 1942	None
19th Army Group 第十九集團軍	Reestablished: Apr 1943; Downsized into 22nd Corps: Sep 1946	Wang Zhonglian 王仲廉	Apr 1943 – Sep 1943	None
19th Army Group 第十九集團軍	Reestablished: Apr 1943; Downsized into 22nd Corps: Sep 1946	Tang Enbo 湯恩伯	Sep 1943 – Jan 1944	None
19th Army Group 第十九集團軍	Reestablished: Apr 1943; Downsized into 22nd Corps: Sep 1946	Chen Ta-ching 陳大慶	Jan 1944 – Oct 1945	Battle of Central Henan; Battle of West Henan–North Hubei
19th Army Group 第十九集團軍	Reestablished: Apr 1943; Downsized into 22nd Corps: Sep 1946	Zhang Xuezhong 張雪中	Oct 1945 – Sep 1946	None
20th Army Group 第二十集團軍	Established: Sep 1937; Disbanded: Jun 1945	Shang Zhen 商震	Sep 1937 – Jul 1940	Beiping–Hankou Railway Operation; Battle of Wuhan; Battle of Nanchang; First Battle of Changsha; 1939–40 Winter Offensive
20th Army Group 第二十集團軍	Established: Sep 1937; Disbanded: Jun 1945	Huo Kuizhang 霍揆章	Jul 1940 – Jun 1945	Second Battle of Changsha; Battle of Yunnan-Burma Road; Battle of Northern Burma and Western Yunnan; Second Burma Expedition
20th Army Group 第二十集團軍	Reestablished: Jan 1946; Downsized into 21st Corps: Feb 1947	Xia Chuzhong 夏楚中	Jan 1946 – Feb 1947	None

== 21st to 30th army groups ==
Unit	Organization	Commanders	Duration	Major battles
21st Army Group 第二十一集團軍	Established: Oct 1937; Reorganized into 8th Pacification Area: Oct 1945	Liao Lei † 廖磊 (卒)	Oct 1937 – Oct 1939	Battle of Shanghai; Battle of Xuzhou; Battle of Wuhan; Battle of Suixian–Zaoyang
21st Army Group 第二十一集團軍	Established: Oct 1937; Reorganized into 8th Pacification Area: Oct 1945	Li Pinxian 李品仙	Oct 1939 – Oct 1945	1939–40 Winter Offensive; Second Battle of Changsha; Battle of West Hubei; Battle of Changde; Battle of West Henan–North Hubei
22nd Army Group 第二十二集團軍	Established: Nov 1937; Reorganized into 5th Pacification Area: Oct 1945	Deng Xihou 鄧錫侯	Nov 1937 – May 1938	Battle of Taiyuan; Battle of Xuzhou
22nd Army Group 第二十二集團軍	Established: Nov 1937; Reorganized into 5th Pacification Area: Oct 1945	Sun Zhen 孫震	May 1938 – Oct 1945	Battle of Wuhan; Battle of Suixian–Zaoyang; 1939–40 Winter Offensive; Battle of Zaoyang–Yichang; Battle of South Henan; Battle of West Hubei; Battle of Changde; Battle of West Henan–North Hubei
23rd Army Group 第二十三集團軍	Established: Dec 1937; Disbanded: Oct 1945	Liu Xiang † 劉湘 (卒)	Dec 1937 – Jan 1938	Battle of Xuzhou
23rd Army Group 第二十三集團軍	Established: Dec 1937; Disbanded: Oct 1945	Tang Shizun 唐式遵	Jan 1938 – Oct 1945	Battle of Shanghai; Battle of Nanking; Battle of Suixian–Zaoyang; 1939–40 Winter Offensive; Battle of Zaoyang–Yichang; Battle of South Henan; Battle of Zhejiang-Jiangxi; Battle of West Hubei; Battle of Changde; Battle of West Henan–North Hubei
24th Army Group 第二十四集團軍	Established: Dec 1937; Disbanded: Feb 1939	Gu Zhutong 顧祝同	Dec 1937 – Mar 1938	Battle of Xuzhou
24th Army Group 第二十四集團軍	Established: Dec 1937; Disbanded: Feb 1939	Han Deqin 韓德勤	Mar 1938 – Feb 1939	None
24th Army Group 第二十四集團軍	Reestablished: Sep 1939; Disbanded: Dec 1943	Pang Bingxun 龐炳勛	Sep 1939 – May 1943	Battle of South Shanxi
24th Army Group 第二十四集團軍	Reestablished: Sep 1939; Disbanded: Dec 1943	Jiang Dingwen 蔣鼎文	May 1943 – Dec 1943	None
24th Army Group 第二十四集團軍	Reestablished: Feb 1944; Disbanded: Mar 1945	Wang Yaowu 王耀武	Feb 1944 – Mar 1945	Battle of Changsha-Hengyang; Battle of Guilin–Liuzhou
25th Army Group 第二十五集團軍	Established: Dec 1937; Disbanded: Jan 1938	Luo Zhuoying 羅卓英	Dec 1937 – Jan 1938	Battle of Nanking
25th Army Group 第二十五集團軍	Reestablished: Jan 1939; Disbanded: Mar 1942	Chen Yi 陳儀	Jan 1939 – Sep 1941	1939–40 Winter Offensive
25th Army Group 第二十五集團軍	Reestablished: Jan 1939; Disbanded: Mar 1942	Liu Jianxu 劉建緒	Sep 1941 – Mar 1942	None
25th Army Group 第二十五集團軍	Reestablished: Jul 1942; Disbanded: Oct 1945	Li Jue 李覺	Jul 1942 – Oct 1945	None
26th Army Group 第二十六集團軍	Established: Jan 1938; Disbanded: Dec 1938	Xu Yuanquan 徐源泉	Jan 1938 – Dec 1938	Battle of Xuzhou; Battle of Wuhan
26th Army Group 第二十六集團軍	Reestablished: Oct 1939; Disbanded: Oct 1945	Huang Qixiang 黃琪翔	Oct 1939 – Nov 1939	None
26th Army Group 第二十六集團軍	Reestablished: Oct 1939; Disbanded: Oct 1945	Cai Tingkai 蔡廷鍇	Nov 1939 – Jul 1940	None
26th Army Group 第二十六集團軍	Reestablished: Oct 1939; Disbanded: Oct 1945	Zhou Nie 周喦	Jul 1940 – Apr 1944	Second Battle of Changsha; Battle of West Hubei; Battle of Changde
26th Army Group 第二十六集團軍	Reestablished: Oct 1939; Disbanded: Oct 1945	Song Kentang 宋肯堂	Apr 1944 – Oct 1945	None
27th Army Group 第二十七集團軍	Established: Jan 1938; Downsized into 24th Corps: May 1946	Yang Sen 楊森	Jan 1938 – Jan 1945	Battle of Xuzhou; Battle of Wuhan; Battle of Nanchang; First Battle of Changsha; 1939–40 Winter Offensive; Second Battle of Changsha; Third Battle of Changsha; Battle of West Hubei; Battle of Changsha-Hengyang; Battle of Guilin–Liuzhou
27th Army Group 第二十七集團軍	Established: Jan 1938; Downsized into 24th Corps: May 1946	Li Yutang 李玉堂	Jan 1945 – May 1946	Battle of West Hunan
28th Army Group 第二十八集團軍	Established: Jan 1938; Disbanded: Apr 1942	Pan Wenhua 潘文華	Jan 1938 – Apr 1942	None
28th Army Group 第二十八集團軍	Reestablished: Feb 1943; Disbanded: Oct 1945	Li Xianzhou 李仙洲	June 1942 – Oct 1945	Battle of Central Henan; Battle of West Henan–North Hubei
29th Army Group 第二十九集團軍	Established: Jan 1938; Disbanded: Oct 1945	Wang Zuanxu 王纘緒	Jan 1938 – Mar 1944	Battle of Wuhan; Battle of Suixian–Zaoyang; 1939–40 Winter Offensive; Battle of Zaoyang–Yichang; Battle of South Henan; Second Battle of Changsha; Battle of West Hubei; Battle of Changde
29th Army Group 第二十九集團軍	Established: Jan 1938; Disbanded: Oct 1945	Li Tiejun 李鐵軍	Mar 1944 – Oct 1945	None
30th Army Group 第三十集團軍	Established: Apr 1938; Disbanded: Oct 1945	Wang Lingji 王陵基	Apr 1938 – Oct 1945	Battle of Wuhan; Battle of Nanchang; First Battle of Changsha; 1939–40 Winter Offensive; Battle of Shanggao; Second Battle of Changsha; Third Battle of Changsha; Battle of West Hubei; Battle of Changde; Battle of Changsha-Hengyang

== 31st to 40th army groups ==
Unit	Organization	Commanders	Duration	Major battles
31st Army Group 第三十一集團軍	Established: Jun 1938; Downsized into 26th Corps: Dec 1946	Tang Enbo 湯恩伯	Jun 1938 – Sep 1943	Battle of Wuhan; Battle of Nanchang; First Battle of Changsha; 1939–40 Winter Offensive; Battle of South Henan; Second Battle of Changsha
31st Army Group 第三十一集團軍	Established: Jun 1938; Downsized into 26th Corps: Dec 1946	Wang Zhonglian 王仲廉	Sep 1943 – Dec 1946	Battle of Central Henan; Battle of West Henan–North Hubei
32nd Army Group 第三十二集團軍	Established: Jun 1938; Downsized into 27th Corps: Aug 1946	Shangguan Yunxiang 上官雲相	Jun 1938 – Sep 1942	Battle of Nanchang; 1939–40 Winter Offensive; Second Battle of Changsha
32nd Army Group 第三十二集團軍	Established: Jun 1938; Downsized into 27th Corps: Aug 1946	Li Mo'an 李默庵	Sep 1942 – Aug 1946	None
32nd Army Group 第三十二集團軍	Established: Jun 1938; Downsized into 27th Corps: Aug 1946	Wang Jingjiu 王敬玖	Aug 1946 – Aug 1946	None
33rd Army Group 第三十三集團軍	Established: Oct 1938; Reorganized into 3rd Pacification Area: Oct 1945	Zhang Zizhong † 張自忠 (卒)	Oct 1938 – May 1940	Battle of Wuhan; Battle of Suixian–Zaoyang; 1939–40 Winter Offensive; Battle of Zaoyang–Yichang
33rd Army Group 第三十三集團軍	Established: Oct 1938; Reorganized into 3rd Pacification Area: Oct 1945	Feng Chian 馮治安	May 1940 – Oct 1945	Battle of Zaoyang–Yichang; Battle of South Henan; Second Battle of Changsha; Battle of West Hubei; Battle of Changde; Battle of West Henan–North Hubei
34th Army Group 第三十四集團軍	Established: Jan 1939; Reorganized into 4th Army Corps: Nov 1948	Jiang Dingwen 蔣鼎文	Jan 1939 – Aug 1939	None
34th Army Group 第三十四集團軍	Established: Jan 1939; Reorganized into 4th Army Corps: Nov 1948	Hu Zongnan 胡宗南	Aug 1939 – Feb 1943	None
34th Army Group 第三十四集團軍	Established: Jan 1939; Reorganized into 4th Army Corps: Nov 1948	Li Yannian 李延年	Feb 1943 – Jan 1945	Battle of Central Henan
34th Army Group 第三十四集團軍	Established: Jan 1939; Reorganized into 4th Army Corps: Nov 1948	Li Wen 李文	Jan 1945 – Nov 1948	None
35th Army Group 第三十五集團軍	Established: Oct 1939; Disbanded: Mar 1945	Li Hanhun 李漢魂	Oct 1939 – Jan 1940	None
35th Army Group 第三十五集團軍	Established: Oct 1939; Disbanded: Mar 1945	Deng Longguang 鄧龍光	Jan 1940 – Mar 1945	Battle of Guilin–Liuzhou
36th Army Group 第三十六集團軍	Established: Oct 1939; Disbanded: Jan 1945	Li Jiayu † 李家鈺 (卒)	Oct 1939 – Jun 1944	Battle of Central Henan
36th Army Group 第三十六集團軍	Established: Oct 1939; Disbanded: Jan 1945	Liu Kan 劉戡	Jun 1944 – Dec 1944	None
36th Army Group 第三十六集團軍	Established: Oct 1939; Disbanded: Jan 1945	Li Yutang 李玉堂	Dec 1944 – Jan 1945	None
36th Army Group 第三十六集團軍	Reestablished: Mar 1945; Disbanded: Jun 1945	Yu Jishi 俞濟時	Mar 1945 – Jun 1945	None
37th Army Group 第三十七集團軍	Established: Nov 1939; Disbanded: Apr 1940	Ye Zhao 葉肇	Nov 1939 – Apr 1940	Battle of South Guangxi
37th Army Group 第三十七集團軍	Established: Jun 1942; Downsized into 29th Corps: Aug 1946	Tao Shiyue 陶峙岳	Jun 1942 – Apr 1944	None
37th Army Group 第三十七集團軍	Established: Jun 1942; Downsized into 29th Corps: Aug 1946	Ding Delong 丁德隆	Apr 1944 – Dec 1945	None
37th Army Group 第三十七集團軍	Established: Jun 1942; Downsized into 29th Corps: Aug 1946	Liu Kan 劉戡	Dec 1945 – Aug 1946	None
38th Army Group 第三十八集團軍	Established: Dec 1939; Disbanded: Apr 1940	Xu Tingyao 徐庭瑤	Dec 1939 – Apr 1940	Battle of South Guangxi
38th Army Group 第三十八集團軍	Reestablished: Jun 1942; Downsized into 1st Corp: Nov 1946	Fan Hanjie 范漢杰	June 1942 – Jan 1945	None
38th Army Group 第三十八集團軍	Reestablished: Jun 1942; Downsized into 1st Corp: Nov 1946	Dong Zhao 董釗	Jan 1945 – Nov 1946	None
39th Army Group 第三十九集團軍	Established: Apr 1940; Disbanded: Sep 1944	Shi Yousan 石友三	Jan 1939 – Feb 1941	None
39th Army Group 第三十九集團軍	Established: Apr 1940; Disbanded: Sep 1944	Wei Lihuang 衛立煌	Feb 1941 – Jan 1942	None
39th Army Group 第三十九集團軍	Established: Apr 1940; Disbanded: Sep 1944	Jiang Dingwen 蔣鼎文	Jan 1942 – Jan 1942	None
39th Army Group 第三十九集團軍	Established: Apr 1940; Disbanded: Sep 1944	Gao Shuxun 高樹勛	Jan 1942 – Sep 1944	None
40th Army Group 第四十集團軍	Established: Sep 1943; Disbanded: Oct 1945	Ma Bufang 馬步芳	Sep 1943 – Oct 1945	None

== 41st to 43rd army groups ==
Three army groups were established and disbanded during the Chinese Civil War with the communists. No additional information is available.

== See also ==
- Outline of the Chinese Civil War
