= Battle of Wuhan order of battle =

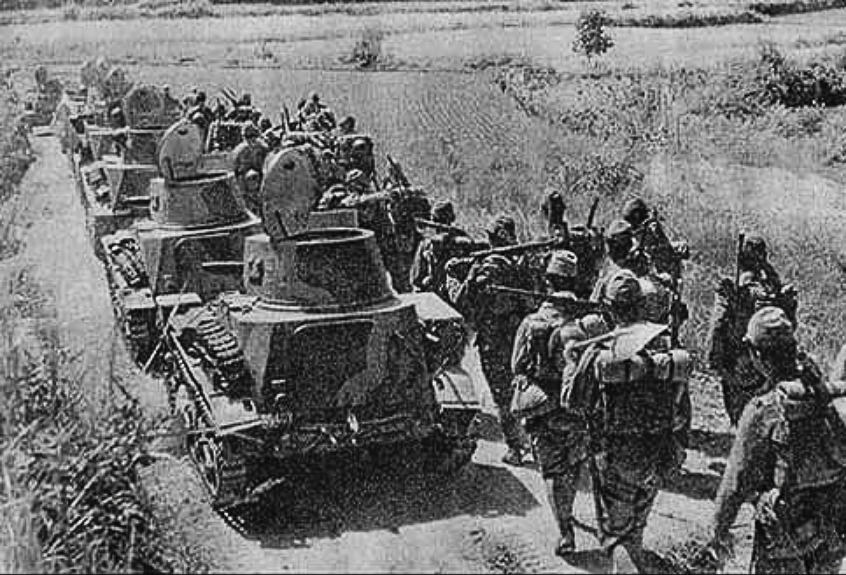
Japanese tankettes with pioneer troops marching towards Wu-han

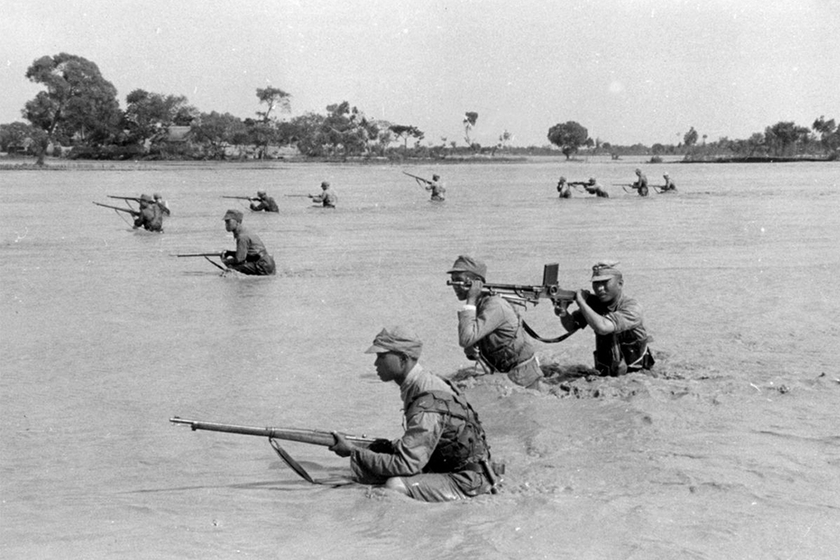
Chinese troops crossing the Yellow River in June 1938, the river was deliberately flooded by Chinese forces to buy time to defend Wuhan.

Below are the units and commanders that participated in the Battle of Wuhan, also called the Wuchang–Hankou campaign, fought from early June through November 12, 1938, a phase of the Second Sino-Japanese War.

== Japan ==
=== Ground forces ===
Imperial Japanese Army (mid-July 1938)

==== Central China Expeditionary Force ====
General Shunroku Hata

15th Division - Lt. Gen. Yoshio Iwamatsu

15th Infantry Brigade Group

51st Infantry Regiment
60th Infantry Regiment
67th Infantry Regiment
1 tankette company

15th Division Reconnaissance Company
21st Field Artillery Regiment
15th Military Engineer Regiment
15th Transport Regiment

17th Division- Lt. Gen. Takichi Kouya

17th Infantry Brigade Group

53rd Infantry Regiment
54th Infantry Regiment
81st Infantry Regiment

23rd Field Artillery Regiment
7th Military Engineer Regiment
17th Transport Regiment

18th Division - Lt. Gen. Seiichi Kunou

23rd Infantry Brigade

55th Infantry Regiment
56th Infantry Regiment

35th Infantry Brigade

114th Infantry Regiment
124th Infantry Regiment

18th Mountain Artillery Regiment
22nd Cavalry Battalion
12th Engineer Regiment
12th Transport Regiment

22nd Division - Lt. Gen. Ichiji Dobashi (Note: joined the Central China Expeditionary Force, July 15)

22nd Infantry Brigade Group

22nd Infantry Regiment
84th Infantry Regiment
86th Infantry Regiment

22nd Recon troops
52nd Mountain Artillery Regiment
22nd Engineer Regiment
22nd Transport Regiment

116th Division - Lt. Gen. Yoshishige Shimizu

119th Infantry Brigade

109th Infantry Regiment
120th Infantry Regiment

130th Infantry Brigade

133rd Infantry Regiment
138th Infantry Regiment

122nd Field Artillery Regiment
120th Cavalry Battalion?
116th Engineer Regiment
116th Transport Regiment

1st Independent Machinegun Battalion
7th Independent Machinegun Battalion
8th Independent Machinegun Battalion
6th Independent Light Armored Car Battalion
8th Independent Light Armored Car Battalion
9th Independent Light Armored Car Battalion
5th Tank Regiment
7th Tank Regiment
2nd Independent Mountain Artillery Regiment
3rd Independent Mountain Artillery Regiment
10th Field Heavy Artillery Regiment
5th Field Heavy Artillery Brigade

11th Field Heavy Artillery Regiment
12th Field Heavy Artillery Regiment-

6th Field Heavy Artillery Brigade

13th Field Heavy Artillery Regiment
14th Field Heavy Artillery

1st Mortar Battalion
4th Mortar Battalion
1st Independent Military Engineer Regiment
2nd Independent Military Engineer Regiment
8th, Independent Military Engineer Regiment
12th Independent Military Engineer Regiment
Guard Division

4th Field Anti-aircraft gun Company
5th Field Anti-aircraft gun Company
7th Field Anti-aircraft gun Company

16th Division

5th Field Anti-aircraft gun Company
6th Field Anti-aircraft gun Company

River transport unit - Maj. Gen. Katamura Shihachi
Jiujiang Anti-aircraft gun Company
Army Labor troops (3rd Independent Military Engineer Regiment)
Army Railroad Unit - Maj. Ochiai Shoji

==== Eleventh Army ====
General Neiji Okamura (Note: Activated July 4)

6th Division
Lt. General Shiro Inaba

9th Infantry Brigade

11th Infantry Regiment
41st Infantry Regiment

21st Infantry Brigade

21st Infantry Regiment
42nd Infantry Regiment

5th Mountain Artillery Regiment
5th Cavalry Regiment
5th Engineer Regiment
5th Transport Regiment

9th Division
Lt. General Ryousuke Yoshizumi (Note: Joined Eleventh army August 22, 1938)

6th Infantry Brigade

7th Infantry Regiment
35th Infantry Regiment

18th Infantry Brigade

19th Infantry Regiment
36th Infantry Regiment

9th Mountain Artillery Regiment
9th Cavalry Regiment
9th Engineer Regiment
9th Transport Regiment

27th Division
Lt. General Masaharu Homma [Joined 11th army July 15, 1938]

1st China Garrison Infantry Regiment

2nd China Garrison Infantry Regiment
3rd China Garrison Infantry Regiment

27th Division reconnaissance troops
27th Mountain Artillery Regiment
27th Military Engineer Regiment
27th Transport Regiment

101st Division
Lt. Gen. Masaki Ito or Lt. Gen. Masatoshi Saito

101st Infantry Brigade

101st Infantry Regiment
149th Infantry Regiment

102nd Infantry Brigade

103rd Infantry Regiment
157th Infantry Regiment

101st Field Artillery Regiment
101st Cavalry Regiment
101st Engineer Regiment
101st Transport Regiment

106th Division
Lt. Gen. Atsuo Matsuura

111th Infantry Brigade

113th Infantry Regiment
147th Infantry Regiment

136th Infantry Brigade

125th Infantry Regiment
145th Infantry Regiment

106th Field Artillery Regiment
106th Cavalry Regiment
106th Engineer Regiment
106th Transport Regiment

Formosa Infantry Brigade
Maj. Gen. Senshuu Shigetou, [operating with China Area fleet]

1st Formosa Infantry Regiment
2nd Formosa Infantry Regiment
Formosa artillery battalion
Formosa engineer battalion
Formosa transport regiment

==== Second Army ====
Prince Naruhiko (Note: Joined Expeditionary Force July 4)

3rd Division - Lt. Gen. Susumu Fujita (Note: Originally with Exped. Force July 15, with Second Army Aug 22nd)

5th Infantry Brigade

6th Infantry Regiment
68th Infantry Regiment

29th Infantry Brigade

18th Infantry Regiment
34th Infantry Regiment

3rd Field Artillery Regiment
3rd Cavalry Regiment
3rd Engineer Regiment
3rd Transport Regiment

10th Division – Lt. Gen. Yoshio Shinozuka

8th Infantry Brigade

39th Infantry Regiment
40th Infantry Regiment

33rd Infantry Brigade

10th Infantry Regiment
63rd Infantry Regiment

10th Field Artillery Regiment
10th Cavalry Regiment
10th Engineer Regiment
10th Transport Regiment

13th Division - Lt. Gen. Ryuhei Ogisu (Note: Originally with Exped. Force, with 2nd Army July 4)

26th Infantry Brigade

58th Infantry Regiment
116th Infantry Regiment

103rd Infantry Brigade

65th Infantry Regiment
104th Infantry Regiment

19th Mountain Artillery Regiment
17th Cavalry Regiment
13th Engineer Regiment
13th Transport Regiment

16th Division – Lt. Gen. Keisuke Fujie, Gen. Kesao Nakashima, with 2nd Army to July 4]

19th Infantry Brigade

9th Infantry Regiment
20th Infantry Regiment

30th Infantry Brigade

33rd Infantry Regiment
38th Infantry Regiment

22nd Field Artillery Regiment
20th Cavalry Regiment
16th Engineer Regiment
16th Transport Regiment

=== Naval forces ===
One hundred vessels, including over 30 naval craft armed with medium-caliber artillery, were gathered. The landing force for Anqing was composed of one infantry brigade, a marine landing battalion, artillery, engineers and chemical elements, totaling about 12,000 men and 80 to 90 guns. The squadron comprised 40 units, including destroyers, minesweepers, naval and river gunboats and blockade boats. Twenty steamboats transported the troops designated to make the landing.

3rd Fleet and China Area Fleet - Adm. Oiakwa Koshiro

China Area fleet: - Vice Adm. Kiyoshi Hasegawa

Izumo (F) (Izumo class armoured cruiser)

4-20.3 cm gun (2x2), 14-15.2 cm QF gun (1x14), 12-12pdr QF gun (1x12),8-2.5pdr QF gun (1x8), 4–45 cm TT

Iwate (Izumo class armoured cruiser)

4-20.3 cm gun (2x2), 14-15.2 cm QF gun (1x14), 12-12pdr QF gun (1x12),8-2.5pdr QF gun (1x8), 4–45 cm TT

One of these cruisers was detached to Yosuko Force to bombard Matang, both to bombard Matou.

11th Sentai (gunboat flotilla) - Rear Adm. Eijiro Kondo 12/37-12/38

flagship Ataka (Gunboat)

2–12 cm/45cal gun, 2–8 cm/40cal gun, 6 MGs. (1933 May 20, Ataka was incorporated into the 11th squadron as its flagship.)

Kuri (2nd Class Destroyer) 3 x 12 cm/45cal gun, 2 x 7.7 mm MGs, 4 x 53 cm TT (2x2)
Tsuga (2nd Class Destroyer) 3–12 cm/45cal gun, 2-7.7 mm MGs, 4–53 cm TT (2x2)
Hasu (2nd Class Destroyer) 3–12 cm/45cal gun, 2-7.7 mm MGs, 4–53 cm TT (2x2
Yaeyama (minelayer) 2–12 cm/45cal gun, 2 MGs, 185 mines (maybe with 12th Sentai?)
Hozu (Gunboat) 2–8 cm/40cal gun, 3 or 6–13 mm MG
Katada (Gunboat) 2–8 cm/40cal gun, 3 or 6–13 mm MG
Atami (Gunboat) 1–8 cm/28cal gun, 6 MGs
Seta (Gunboat) 2–8 cm/40cal gun, 3 or 6–13 mm MG
Toba (Gunboat) 2–8 cm/28cal gun, 6 MGs
Hira (Gunboat) 2–8 cm/40cal gun, 3 or 6–13 mm MG
Futami (Gunboat) 1–8 cm/28cal gun, 6 MGs
Sumida (Gunboat) 2–47 mm/40cal gun, 4 MGs
Kotaka (Gunboat) 5 MGs
Saga (Gunboat) 1–12 cm/45cal gun, 3–8 cm/40cal gun, 3 MGs. (Saga was incorporated into the 3rd fleet 11th squadron on 1937 October 20.)

1st Sentai

1st Destroyer Torpedoboat Unit - ?

Kasasagi, (Otori class torpedo boat) 3–12 cm/45cal gun (1x3), 1–40 mm AA, 3–53 cm TT (1x3)
Hiyodori, (Otori class torpedo boat) 3–12 cm/45cal gun (1x3), 1–40 mm AA, 3–53 cm TT (1x3)
Otori, (Otori class torpedo boat) 3–12 cm/45cal gun (1x3), 1–40 mm AA, 3–53 cm TT (1x3)
Hayabusa) (Otori class torpedo boat) 3–12 cm/45cal gun (1x3), 1–40 mm AA, 3–53 cm TT (1x3)

11th Torpedoboat Unit

Kari (Otori class torpedo boat) 3–12 cm/45cal gun (1x3), 1–40 mm AA, 3–53 cm TT (1x3)
Sagi (Otori class torpedo boat) 3–12 cm/45cal gun (1x3), 1–40 mm AA, 3–53 cm TT (1x3)
Hato (Otori class torpedo boat) 3–12 cm/45cal gun (1x3), 1–40 mm AA, 3–53 cm TT (1x3)
? Kiji (Otori class torpedo boat) 3–12 cm/45cal gun (1x3), 1–40 mm AA, 3–53 cm TT (1x3)

21st Torpedoboat Unit

Chidori (Chidori class torpedo boat) 3–12 cm/45cal gun (1x3), 1-7.7 mm AA, 2–53 cm TT (2x1)
Manazuru (Chidori class torpedo boat) 3–12 cm/45cal gun (1x3), 1-7.7 mm AA, 2–53 cm TT (2x1)
Tomozuru (Chidori class torpedo boat) 3–12 cm/45cal gun (1x3), 1-7.7 mm AA, 2–53 cm TT (2x1)
Hatsukari (Chidori class torpedo boat) 3–12 cm/45cal gun (1x3), 1-7.7 mm AA, 2–53 cm TT (2x1)

12th Sentai (minelayer) ?

1st Minesweeper Unit 1awg = Tsubame - Kamone - Sugi maru - Kashiwa maru

Tsubame (Tsubame class minelayer) 1–8 cm/40cal AA gun, 1-13.2 mm AA, 120 mines
Kamone (Tsubame class minelayer) 1–8 cm/40cal AA gun, 1-13.2 mm AA, 120 mines
Yamasemi (torpedo boat) 2–8 cm QF gun, 2–47 mm QF gun, 2–45 cm TT (detached from Torpedoboat Sentai?)
Sugi maru (Military used merchantmen minesweeper ?)
Kashiwa maru (Military used merchantmen minesweeper ?)

2nd Minesweeper Unit 2 awg = Kotaka and Minor/Smaller craft
Kotaka (Gunboat) 5 MGs (detached from 11th Sentai)
Daihatsu, Shohatsu and other small craft

#3 Flying Group (Kosen or Koku Sentai), 3rd Fleet.

Kamikawa Maru (Mobilized Merchantman seaplane tender) 2–15 cm gun, 2–8 cm AA gun, 4–25 mm AA, 2 catapults, 12 or 8 aircraft (E8N)+
Notoro (seaplane tender) 2–8 cm/40cal AA gun, 8 aircraft (E8N)+
Kiji (Otori class torpedo boat) 3–12 cm/45cal gun (1x3), 1–40 mm AA, 3–53 cm TT (1x3) (from 11th Torpedoboat Sentai)

Transport Unit ?

20 steamboat transports
Daihatsu, Shohatsu and other small craft

Special Unit

Formosa Brigade (see 11th Army above)
NLF "Okamoto unit"
Kure 4th SNLF (after Aug. 1938)
Kure 5th SNLF

Special Working Unit

2nd Combined Air Group, 3rd Fleet.
Sōryū detachment +

Fighter daitai - 9 Nakajima A4N1s or Mitsubishi A5M
Bomber daitai - 18 Aichi D1A1
Attack daitai - 9 Yokosuka B3Y1

Based at Wuhu 6/38, Anqing 6/38 - 11/38) In June the Sōryū detachment moved from Nanking to Wuhu in early June and by mid-June to the Anqing base. At this time they flew air defence and ground support sorties.

Land-based Naval Air Force

12th Kōkūtai +

Fighter daitai - 27 Mitsubishi A5M
Bomber daitai - Aichi D1A1
Attack daitai - Yokosuka B3Y1

A predominantly carrier fighter unit. Based at Anqing (06/38 – autumn/38)

13th Kōkūtai +

Fighter daitai - 24 Mitsubishi A5M
Attack daitai - 18 Mitsubishi G3M

Reorganized on 22 March 1938 to a predominantly land attack unit. The fighter daitai was disbanded on 15 November 1938. Based at Shanghai

15th Kōkūtai +

Fighter daitai - 9 Nakajima A4N1 (to 09/38), 9 Mitsubishi A5M (after 09/38)
Bomber daitai -12 Aichi D1A1
Attack daitai - 9 Yokosuka B3Y1

Based at Anqing (10/07/38 – 09/38), Kowkong (09/38 – 01/12/38)

Notes on naval forces:

15th Kōkūtai entered combat on 10 July from Anqing, and they included A5Ms from the aircraft carrier Sōryū, stationed off the coast since April. The several A5Ms located at Anqing had been unable to provide adequate air protection for Japanese forces until the arrival of the 15th Kōkūtai. At this time the 15th Kōkūtai had a nominal strength of one unit of carrier fighters (12 aircraft), one unit of carrier bombers (12 aircraft) and a half unit carrier attack aircraft (six aircraft). Actual strength was nine A4Ns, nine A5Ms, 18 carrier bombers and nine carrier attack aircraft. Primary duties were to cooperate in the army’s Hankou operations and in particular air defense in the areas along the Yangtze River.
Pictures and drawings of Japanese gunboats (mostly used on Yangtze River)
Armament and ship id from http://admiral31.world.coocan.jp/e/index.htm
There is a listing for a Yamasemi torpedo boat formerly the Chinese torpedo boat

Chi Fu Po renamed Chien Kang was sunk 9/37 and raised by Japan and recommissioned as the Yamasemi the same year armed with 2–8 cm QF gun, 2–47 mm QF gun, 2–45 cm TT See: http://surfcity.kund.dalnet.se/sino-japanese-1938.htm

=== Army Air Force ===
Over 300 planes were part of the Wuhan operation.

Central China Aviation Army Corps(before Aug.2) - Yoshi Tokugawa,

Hiko Dai 2 Daitai of Hiko Dai 16 Hiko Rentai

IJAAF Type 88 reconnaissance aircraft

Hiko Dai 8 Rinji Daitai - Colonel Sojiro Takeda :

Hiko Dai 1 Chutai - Kawasaki Ki-10
Hiko Dai 2 Chutai - Kawasaki Ki-10

(8th Hiko Daitai was split on 31 July to form the 77th Flying Sentai and the 41st Airfield Daitai. Based at Shanghai (06/38 – 07/38), Nanking (July 1938)

10th Dokuritsu Hiko Chutai

Kawasaki Ki-10 ( – 07/38)
Nakajima Ki-27 (07/38 –)

Based at Nanking, Anqing, Jiujiang (03/38 – 10/38), Hankou (10/38 – 12/38)

17th Dokuritsu Hiko Chutai

Reconnaissance squadron

2nd Hiko Daitai - Maj. Tamiya Teranishi ::

1st chutai - Kawasaki Ki-10
2nd chutai - Kawasaki Ki-10

2nd Hiko Daitai Was amalgamated on 1 August 1938 with the 9th I F Chutai to form the 64th Sentai.

9th Dokuritsu Hiko Chutai

Capt. Goro Suzuki (06/38 – 01/08/38) - Kawasaki Ki-10

Was amalgamated on 1 August 1938 with the 2nd Hiko Daitai to form the 64th Sentai. Based at Changte

18th Dokuritsu Hiko Chutai - Reconnaissance squadron.

Based at Nanching (08/38 – )

41st Airfield Daitai (08/38 – ?)

On August 2, the supreme headquarters issued an order to reorganize the Central China aviation army corps establishment. In to bring it in line with the North China Front Army Aviation Corps. Headquarters Nanjing.

Central China Aviation Army Corps(after Aug.2) - Yoshi Tokugawa[1,2,

77th Hiko Sentai - Col. Sojiro Takeda

1st chutai - Kawasaki Ki-10
2nd chutai - Kawasaki Ki-10

Based in Anqing (08/38 – 11/38). Was formed from the 8th Daitai on 31 July 1938.

3rd Air Regiment - Gen. ?

10th Dokuritsu Hiko Chutai - senior captain

Kawasaki Ki-10 ( – 07/38)
Nakajima Ki-27 (07/38 – 06/42)

Based on Nanking, Anqing, Jiujiang (08/38 – 10/38), Hankou (10/38 – 12/38)

17th Dokuritsu Hiko Chutai - senior captain - Reconnaissance squadron

Based in Central China ?, North China?

45th Hiko Sentai - Colonel - light bomber unit

Based: Central China ?, North China?

75th Hiko Sentai - Colonel - Light bomber unit

Based: Central China ?, North China?

4th Air Regiment -

64th Hiko Sentai - Maj. Tamiya Teranishi :::

1st chutai - Nakajima Ki-27
2nd chutai - Kawasaki Ki-10, Nakajima Ki-27
3rd chutai - Kawasaki Ki-10, Nakajima Ki-27

Based: Changte (August 1938), Ertaokou (08/38 – 11/38), Tianhe (09/11/38 – 26/07/39) Was formed on 1 August 1938 from the 2nd Hiko Daitai and the 9th I F Chutai.

60th Hiko Sentai

Mitsubishi Ki-21

Based: Central China ?, North China?

98th Hiko Sentai - colonel - Fiat BR.20 Heavy bomber

Based: Central China ?, North China?

18th Dokuritsu Hiko Chutai

Reconnaissance squadron

Based: Nanching (08/38 – )

41st Airfield Daitai (08/38 – ?)

Was formed from the 8th Daitai on 31 July 1938

59th Hiko Sentai

1st chutai - Nakajima Ki-27
2nd chutai - Nakajima Ki-27

Based: Anqing (09/38 – 03/11/38), Hankou (03/11/38 – 08/39)

== China (early July 1938) ==
=== Army ===
==== Ninth Army Region ====
..... Chen Cheng

1st Army Group - Hsueh Yueh

20th Group Army - Shang Zhen

32nd Army - Shang Zhen (concurrent)

139th Division - Li Chao-ying
141st Division - Tang Yung-liang
142nd Division - Fu Li-ping
Salt Gabelle Brigade - Chiang Yung-ke

18th Army - Huang Wei

11th Division [G] - Peng Shan
16th Division - Ho Ping
60th Division - Chen Pei

9th Group Army - Wu Qiwei

4th Army - Ou Zhen

59th Division - Chang Teh-neng
90th Division - Chen Yung-chi

8th Army - Li Ye-tung [at Lanfeng]

3rd Division [G] - Chao His-tien
15th Division - Wang Chih-pin

66th Army - Yeh Chao

159th Division - Tan Sui
160th Division - Hua Chen-chung

29th Corps - Li Han-huen

64th Army - Li Han-huen

155th Division - Chen Kung-hsia
187th Division - Kung Ke-chuan
9th Reserve Division - Yen-chuan

70th Army - Li Chueh

19th Division - Li Chueh
91st Division - Chan-hai

6th Reserve Division - Chi Chang-chien

37th Corps - Wang Ching-chiu

25th Army - Wang Ching-chiu

52nd Division - T_____? -shan
109th Division - Liang Hua-sheng

74th Army - Yu Chi-shih

51st Division - Wang Yaou-wu
58th Division - Feng Sheng-fa

29th Army - Chen An-pao

40th Division - Li Tien-hsia
79thDivision - Chan An-pao

167th Division - Chao Hsia-kuang [formerly part of Matan Fortress defense::]
Po Yang Lake Garrison - ?

2nd Army Group - Zhang Fakui

30th Group Army - Wang Lingji

72nd Army - Yu Chi-shih

New 13th Division - Liu Juo-pi
New 14th Division - Fan Nan-hsuen

78th Army - Chang Tsai

New 15th Division - Teng Kuo-chang
New 16th Division - Chen Liang-chi

3rd Group Army - Sun Tongxuan

12th Army - Sun Tongxuan

20th Division - Chang Tse-min
22nd Division - Shih Tung-jan
81st Division - Chan Shu-tang

31st Group Army - Tang Enbo

13th Army - Chang Chen

23rd Division - Ouyang Fen
89th Division [G] - Chang Hsueh-chung
35th Division - Wang Ching tsai

98th Army - Chang Kang

82nd Division - Lo Chi-chiang
193rd Division - Li Tsung-chien
195th Division - Liang Kai

32nd Group Army - Kuan Lin-cheng

52nd Army - Kuan Lin-cheng

2nd Division [G] - Chao Kung-wu
25th Division [G] - Chang Yao-ming

92nd Army - Li Hsien-chou

21st Division - Hou Ching-ju
95th Division - Lo Chi

Tienpei Fortress Command - Li Yen-nien

2nd Army - Li yen-nien

9th Division [G] - Cheng Tso-min
57th Division [G] - Shih Chung-cheng
Tienchiachen Fortress Units

Tiennan Fortress Command - Kuei-chang

54th Army - Hou Kuei-chang

14th Division [G] - Chen Leih
18th Division - Li Fang-pin

Wuhan Garrison - Lo Cho-ying

Yangtse River North Region - Wan Yao-huang

6th Army - Kan Li-chu

93rd Division - Kan Li-chu

16th Army - Tung Chao

28th Division - Tung Chao

Yangtse River South Region - Chou Ai

75th Army - Chao Ai

6th Division - Chang Ying [g]
13th Division - Fang Ching
Huang Ngo Fortress Units

Wuhan Garrison Command - Kuo Chan

94th Army - Kuo Chan

55th Division - Li Chi-lan
185th Division - Fang Tien

37th Army - Huang Kuo-liang

92nd Division - Huang Kuo-liang
Hupei Provincial Air Defense Units

30th Corps - Lu Han

60th Army - Lu Han

184th Division - Chang Chung
49th Division - Li Chi-lan
102nd Division - Po Hui-chang

26th Corps - Wan Fu-lin

53rd Army - Wan Fu-lin

130th Division - Chu Huang-hsun
116th Division - Chou Fu-cheng

==== Fifth Army Region ====
.....Li Zhongren, Bai Chongxi (acting)

3rd Army Group - Sun Lianzhong

2nd Group Army - Sun Lianzhong

30th Army - Tien Chen-nan

30th Division - Chang Ching-lieh
31st Division - Chih Feng-cheng

42nd Army - Feng An-pang

27th Division [G] - Huang Chiao-sung
44th Sep. Brigade - Wu Peng-chu

26th Army - Hsiao Chi-chu

32nd Division - Wang Hsiu-shen
44th Division - Chen Yung

55th Army - Tsao Fu-lin

29th Division - Tsao Fu-lin
74th Division - Li Han-chang

87th Army - Liu Yin-ku

198th Division - Wang Yu-ying

4th Army Group - Li Pinxian

29th Group Army - Wang Tsan-hau

4th Army - Peng Chen-fu

149th Division - Wang Tse-chun
162nd Division - Chang Chieh-cheng

67th Army - Hsu Shao-tsung

150th Division - Liao Chen
161st Division - Hsu Shao-tsung

11th Group Army - Li Pinxian

84th Army - Chin Lien-fang

188th Division - Liu Jen
189th Division - Lin Ya-his

48th Army - Chang Yi-shun

172rd Division - Huo Wei-chen
174th Division - Chang Kuang-Wei
176th Division - Ou Shou-mien

68th Army - Liu Ju-ming

119th Division - Li Chin-tien
143rd Division - Li Tseng-chih

86th Army - Ho Chih-chung

103rd Division - Ho Shao-chou
121nd Division - Mo Ting-fang

26th Group Army - Xu Yuanquan

10th Army - Xu Yuanquan

41st Division - Ting Chih-pan
48th Division - Hsu Chi-wu

199th Division - Lo Shu-chia

21st Group Army - Liao Lei

31st Army - Wei Yun-sung

131st Division - Ling Tse-hui
135th Division - Su Tsu-hsing
138th Division - Mo Teh-hung

7th Army - Chang Kan

171st Division - Chi Tao-cheng
172nd Division - Cheng Shu-fen

19th Corps - Feng Chih-an

77th Army - Feng Chih-an

37th Division - Chang Ling-yun
132nd Division - Wang Chang-hai

51st Army - Yu Hsueh-chung

113th Division - Chou Kuang-lieh
114th Division - Mo Chung-heng

71st Army - Sung Hsi-lien =Lanfeng

61st Division - Chung Sung
88th Division [G]- Chung Pin
36th Division [G] - Chiang Fu-sheng

27th Corps - Chang Tse-chung

59th Army - Chang Tse-chung

Cav. Regiment
38th Division - Huang Wei-kang
180th Division - Liu Chen-san
13th Cavalry Brigade - Yao Ching-chuan

45th Army - Chen Ting-hsun

125th Division - Wang Shih-chun
127th Division - Chen Li

24th Group Army - Han Deqin

57th Army - Miao Cheng-liu

111th Division - Chang En-tuo
112th Division - Huo Shou-wei

89th Army- Han Deqin

33rd Division - Chia Yun-shan
117th Division - Li Shou-wei

27th Group Army - Yang Sen [defense of Anqing:]

20th Army - Yang Sen (concurrent)

133rd Division - Yang Han-yu
134th Division - Yang Han-chung

17th Corps - Hu Tsung-nan

1st Army - Hu Tsung-nan (concurrent)

1st Division - Li Cheng-hsien
78th Division - Li Wen

[G] = German Trained Division

=== Air Forces ===
4th Pursuit Group (PG) - Mao Ying-Chu

21st Pursuit Squadron (PS) - Lo Ying-Teh (Polikarpov I-16)
22nd PS - Zhang Wei-Hua(to 04/07/38), Wang Yuan-Po (after 04/07/38) (Curtiss Hawk III, Polikarpov I-15bis, Polikarpov I-16)
23rd PS - Liu Chung-Wu (Polikarpov I-15bis, Curtiss Hawk III)

24th PS (Independent) - Liang Yi-Guan (Polikarpov I-16s)
1st Bomber Group (BG) (Just became operational in spring of 1938)

2nd Bomber Squadron (BS) - Sun Tungan (Tupolev SB)

6th BG(Reorganizing from a bomber to a fighter group)

34th PS (Henschel Hs-123)

Voluntary Soviet units (Soviet fighter groups varied from two to eight, though for the largest period of time there were five.)

Machin group - Machin (Tupolev SB)
Titov group - G. V. Titov (Tupolev SB), Arrived in China in June 1938.
Nikolaenko group - E. M. Nikolaenko (Polikarpov I-16)

=== Naval Forces ===
June 1938 between Mantang and Hukou

9 Gunboats: Yi Sheng, Hsien Ning, Chung Ning, Sui Ning, Chung Shan (Capt Sa Shih Chun), Chu Tung, Yung Sheng, Chu Chien, Hu Fu(?)
Unknown number of “high-speed” boats and PT-boats, among them No. 93, Shin No. 223, Yueh No. 253, Wen No. 42, Wen No. 88. These boats were assigned to the Chinese Navy GHQ after the Torpedo School was deactivated on July 9, 1938.
Minelayer(s): One known; Huying
Naval Gun units at Yangtze Fortress Matang, Hukou, Tienchia and Kotien; see above under Army and below in Notes.

After July 1938 additional craft appear in references at Hankow to await possible evacuation of the National Military Council.

Gunboats: Chu Kuan, Yung Chi, Chiang yuan.
Unknown boat types: Chung Shan, Chaing Chen, Min Sheng.

In PoYang Lake

9 Gun boats: Yin Ning (Capt Yen Chuan Ching), Hai Ning, and seven others.

== Notes ==
The Battle of Antsin (Anqing today) Chinese side includes 27th Group Army, commanded by general Yang Sen, and 20th Army (Sichuan provincial army). Defense of Antsin had been entrusted to the Chinese 146th and 147th Divisions. These were from the Sichuan provincial army, 27th Group Army. They are omitted from the July oob above because they were defeated in June, probably pulled from the line for refitting.

27th Group Army - Yang Sen, Defended Anqing, Wu-wei, Takuanin in June 1938

20th Army - Yang Sen (concurrent)

133rd Division - Yang Han-yu
134th Division - Yang Han-chung
146th Division - ?
147th Division - ?

Matan Fortress Garrison consisted of Naval Fortress troops with twelve 12-cm (4.7 inch) guns, 53rd and 167th Divisions. (53rd Division omitted from the July oob above because they were defeated in June, probably pulled from the line for refitting.)
Other Fortress Units consisted of Naval Fortress troops six 10.5-cm (4 inch) guns at Hukou, sixteen 10.5-cm (4 inch) guns at Tienchiachen, ten 7.5-cm (3 inch) guns at Huang.
20 German trained divisions were trained and organized according to plans of the German advisors. They belonged to the first 2 phases of the reorganization of KMT forces. Another 10 divisions (3rd phase) were in training when war broke out. 60 were planned.

Fully trained: 2nd, 4th, 11th, 10th, 25th, 27th, 57th, 67th, 80th, 83rd, 89th Divisions trained on the German pattern by Chinese officers with 2 German advisors.
Partially trained: 3rd, 6th, 9th, 14th, 36th, 87th, 88th Divisions, and the Tax Police (die Salz Division) Division had German advisors directly involved in their training.
