= Battle of South Henan order of battle =

Battle of South Henan (late Jan. – early Feb. 1941)

== Japan ==
11th Army – Waichirō Sonobe

- 3rd Division – Fusataro Hanjima [1]?
  - 5th Infantry Brigade
    - 6th Infantry Regiment
    - 68th Infantry Regiment
  - 29th Infantry Brigade
    - 18th Infantry Regiment
    - 34th Infantry Regiment
  - 3rd Field Artillery Regiment
  - 3rd Cavalry Regiment
  - 3rd Engineer Regiment
  - 3rd Transport Regiment
- 39th Division – Lt. Gen Keisaku Muragami [4,5]
  - 39th Infantry Brigade Group
    - 231st Infantry Rregiments
    - 232nd Infantry Regiments
    - 233rd Infantry Regiments
  - 39th Recon Regiment
  - 39th Field Artillery Regiment
  - 39th Military Engineer Regiment
  - 39th Transport Regiment
- 4th Division (partial) – Lt. Gen Kenzo Kitano [4,5]
  - 4th Infantry Brigade group:
    - 8th Infantry Regiment
    - 37th Infantry Regiment
    - 61st Infantry Regiment
  - 4th Recon Regiment
  - 4th Field Artillery Regiment
  - 4th Military Engineer Regiment
  - 4th Transport Regiment
- 40th Division – Lt-General Naojikiro Amaya, Manchuria 10/2/39-8/25/1941[4,5]
  - 40th Infantry Brigade group:
    - 234th Infantry regiment
    - 235th Infantry regiment
    - 236th Infantry regiment
  - 40th Cavalry regiment
  - 40th mountain artillery regiment
  - 40th military engineer regiment
  - 40th Transport regiment
- Kurahashi Detachment/15th Division – Col. Kurahashi
  - 60th Infantry Regiment (from 15th Division in the Nanchang area)
- 17th Division – Lt-General Morito Hirabayashi[4,5]
  - 17th Infantry Brigade Group
    - 53rd Infantry Regiment
    - 54th Infantry Regiment
    - 81st Infantry Regiment
  - 23rd Field Artillery Regiment
  - 7th Military Engineer Regiment
  - 17th Transport Regiment
- 18th Independent Mixed Brigade – Lt. Gen Taka Kayashima 1939- 1941[4,5]
  - 92nd Independent infantry battalion
  - 93rd Independent infantry battalion
  - 94th Independent infantry battalion
  - 95th Independent infantry battalion
  - 96th independent infantry battalion
  - artillery troops
  - labor troops
  - signal communication unit.
- 7th Tank Regiment – ?
- 13th Tank Regiment – ?
- ? Tank Regiment – ? [1] (one of 3 Tank Regiments)
- 1 Separate Heavy Artillery Regiment

Airforce:

- ? (100 aircraft)

== China ==
5th War Area – Li Zongren [1]

- 2nd Army Group – Sun Lianzhong
  - 55th Corps -Tsao Fu-lin
    - 74th Division – Tsao Fu-lin
    - 29th Division – Li Tseng-chih
  - 59th Corps – Huang Wei-kang
    - 38th Division – Li Chiu-sze
    - 180th Division – Liu Chen-shan
  - 68th Corps – Liu Ju-ming
    - 143rd Division – Huang Chao-sung
    - 119th Division – Chen Hsin-chi
    - 36th Provincial Division – Liu Ju-chen
- 33rd Army Group – Feng Zhi'an
  - 77th Corps – Feng Chih-an (concurrent
    - 37th Division – Li Chiu-sze
    - 179th Division – Liu Chen-shan
  - 30th Corps – Chih Feng-cheng
    - 27th Division – Hsu Wen-yao
    - 30th Division – Liu Chen-shan
- 2nd Army – Ho Chu-kuo
  - Separate Inf. Brigade
  - 3rd Division -
- 31st Army Group – Tang Enbo
  - 92nd Corps – Li Hsien-chou
    - 21st Division – Hsu Wen-yao
    - 142nd Division – Fu Li-ping
    - 14th Provincial Division – Liao Yun-tse
  - 85th Corps – Li Hsien-chou
    - 4th Division – Shih Chueh
    - 25th Division – Ni Tsu-hui
    - 11th Reserve Division – Chang Tang-hsiang
  - 29th Corps – Chen Ta-ching
    - 19th Division – Lai Ju-hsiung
    - 91st Division – Wang Yu-wen
    - 16th Provincial Division – Li Chiang
  - 13th Corps – Chang Hsueh-chung
    - 89th Division – Shu Yung
    - 110th Division – Wu Shao-chou
    - New 1st Division – Tsai Chi
  - 84th Corps – Mo Shu-chieh
    - ?
- 36th Corps – ?
  - ?
- 15th Sep. Brigade – Huang Tze-hua
- 14th Artillery Regiment
- 4th Separate Engineer Battalion
- 4th Battery, 1st Btn. 56th AT Regiment

Airforce:

- ?

== Sources ==
- [1] Hsu Long-hsuen and Chang Ming-kai, History of The Sino-Japanese War (1937-1945) 2nd Ed., 1971. Translated by Wen Ha-hsiung, Chung Wu Publishing; 33, 140th Lane, Tung-hwa Street, Taipei, Taiwan Republic of China.
- [4] Generals from Japan
- [5] The Japanese Mutumi troop encyclopedia
