= Group army =

Group army may refer to

- in Chinese contexts, either:
  - a corps-level formation, such as the present-day group armies of China
  - a field army such as: army groups of the National Revolutionary Army during World War II
- in other contexts an army group, comprising several field armies
