= Zhejiang-Jiangxi campaign =

Military campaign of the Second Sino-Japanese War

- Part of the Second Sino-Japanese War of World War II
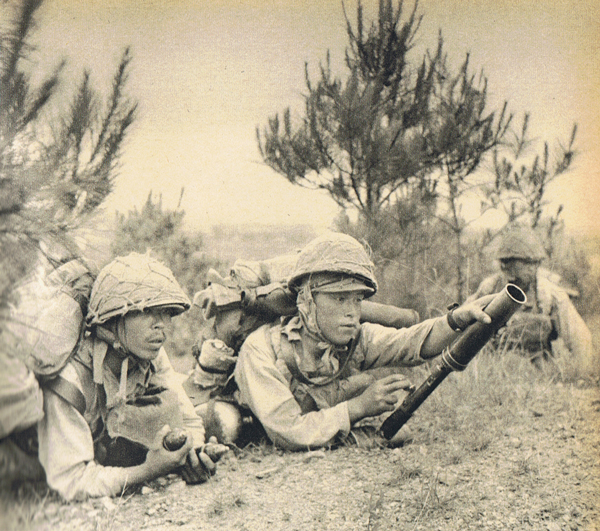
- A Japanese soldier with 50 mm heavy grenade discharger during the campaign in May 30
Date	May 15 – September 4, 1942 (3 months, 2 weeks and 6 days)
Location	Vicinity of Zhejiang and Jiangxi province in the Republic of China
Result	Japanese victory

Belligerents
China; United States	Japan

Commanders and leaders
Gu Zhutong; Shangguan Yunxiang; Tang Shizun; Wang Jingjiu; Li Jue; Xue Yue; Ou Zhen; Shi Zhongcheng; Wang Yaowu; Xia Chuzhong; Sun Du; Feng Sheng-Fa; Ting Chin-Pan; Wang Tieh-Han; Chang Wen-Ching; Tao Guang; Liu Yu-Ching; Fan Tse-Ying; Mo Yu-Shuo	Shunroku Hata; Shigeru Sawada; Korechika Anami; Sanji Ōkido; Tetsuzo Ide; Takayuki Uchida; Toshijiro Takeuchi; Johkichi Nanbu; Haruo Yamamura; Hachiro Tagami; Tagaji Takahashi; Shigeru Ōga; Saburo Takehara; Takejiro Imai; Tokutaro Ide; Giichi Hirano; Naotsugu Sakai †

Units involved
National Revolutionary Army	Imperial Japanese Army: (Empire of Japan) Unit 731

Strength
22,099 officers and 290,209 soldiers (Note: The statistics for strength and casualties from a small portion of the participating units are not included)	180,000

Casualties and losses
Chinese records: 724 officers and 23,637 soldiers killed 914 officers and 24,366 soldiers wounded 600 officers and 18,040 soldiers missing	Japanese records: 13th Army: (Note: Including 77 killed, died of wounds, or died from illness and 85 wounded in the fourth phase a large portion of which occurred in late September 1942 after the main force had withdrawn); 1,284 killed or died from illness 2,767 wounded 11,812 fallen ill 11th Army: 336 killed 949 wounded
- Contemporary American estimates: more than 250,000 civilians killed Chinese records: 20,000 - 66,526+ civilians killed, wounded, or missing in Zhejiang. Unknown number of civilians killed in Jiangxi

The Zhejiang-Jiangxi campaign or the Chekiang–Kiangsi campaign (Japanese: 浙贛作戦, simplified Chinese: 浙赣战役; traditional Chinese: 浙赣戰役; pinyin: Zhè-Gàn Zhànyì), also known as Operation Sei-go (Japanese: せ号作戦), was a campaign by the China Expeditionary Army of the Imperial Japanese Army under Shunroku Hata and Chinese 3rd War Area forces under Gu Zhutong in Chinese provinces of Zhejiang and Jiangxi from mid May to early September 1942.

Hata's forces launched the campaign in retaliation for the Doolittle Raid, conducted by American pilots who had then landed in China's Zhejiang and Jiangxi provinces. Besides seizing local airfields, Japanese troops launched massive reprisal campaigns against the local population by "slaughtering every man and child." Anywhere from over 20,000 to as many as 250,000 Chinese died in the Japanese reprisals, the majority civilians.

== Background ==
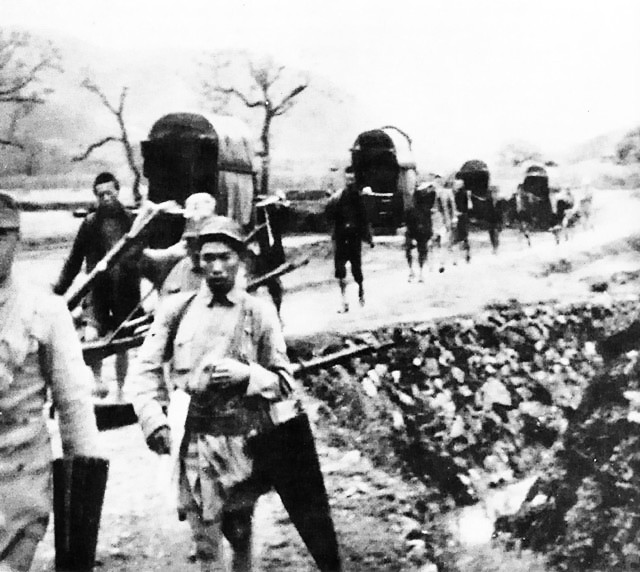
Chinese soldiers assist Doolittle's pilots to safety in Eastern China, 1942.

On April 18, 1942, the United States launched the Doolittle Raid, an attack by 16 B-25 Mitchell bombers from the aircraft carrier USS Hornet on Tokyo, Nagoya, and Yokohama. The original plan was for the aircraft to bomb Japan and land at airfields in unoccupied portion of China. Because the raid had to be launched earlier than planned, all but one of the aircraft (which against orders diverted to the Soviet Union) ran out of fuel and crashed in the Chinese provinces of Zhejiang and Jiangxi or their offshore islands.

Sixty-four American airmen parachuted into the area around Zhejiang. Most were given shelter by Chinese civilians but eight Americans were captured by Japanese troops; three were shot after a show trial for crimes against humanity.

== The campaign ==
Imperial General Headquarters was aware of possible air attacks from Chinese territory on Japan. Two days before the Doolittle Raid, Headquarters set up an operational plan with the goal of defeating Chinese forces and destroying air bases. The operation started on May 15, 1942, with 40 infantry battalions and 15–16 artillery battalions of the Imperial Japanese Army.

On May 15, the main force of the Japanese 13th Army invaded westward along the Zhejiang-Jiangxi Railway and both sides from Fenghua, Shangyu, Shaoxing, Xiaoshan and other towns in Zhejiang. Commander Korechika Anami of the 11th Army commanded two divisions and four detachments to advance from east to west from Hangzhou and Nanchang to attack in the direction of Shangrao, Jiangxi. On August 15, the Japanese army was ordered to retreat, and the Chinese army followed and pursued them. By the end of September, except for Jinhua, Wuyi and the northeastern region, all along the Zhejiang-Jiangxi Railway had been recovered.

Japanese troops conducted a massive search for American airmen and in the process whole towns and villages that were suspected of harboring the Americans were burned to the ground and many civilians executed. The Japanese also wanted to occupy the area to prevent American air force from ever using airfields in China that could put the Japanese mainland within reach.

== Aftermath ==
When Japanese troops moved out of the Zhejiang and Jiangxi areas in mid-August, they left behind a trail of devastation. In Yihuang County, Japanese troops killed all orphans and the elderly sheltered at a missionary station. In that case, Japanese soldiers had bayonetted the victims, or tied them to stakes and burned them like "human candles". In other cases, Japanese soldiers threw children into wells and drowned them.

Claire Chennault reported 250,000 Chinese deaths from Japanese reprisals during the campaign. In 1943 after escaping pursuing Japanese troops in China, Vincentian Father Vincent D. Smith reported to American newspapers that Japanese troops had murdered more than 250,000 Chinese civilians in their search for Doolittle's flyers. American Historians James M. Scott, Richard Frank, and John A. Haymond also cite this figure.

The Record of Battles on the Main Front of the Chinese War of Resistance Against Japan authored by Lieutenant-General Guo Rugui and Huang Yuzhang states that in Quzhou alone over 20,000 civilians were murdered, another 30,000 were captured and went missing, and over 100,000 houses were burned down. The official Chinese records of losses within Zhejiang Province record at least 66,526 civilians killed, wounded, or missing in 1942—noting this accounted for over 21% of the province's direct casualties as a result of the war and was largely due to the campaign. (Note: Civilian casualties directly caused by the Japanese or Chinese Collaborationist forces. Laborers directly killed or injured by Japanese or Chinese Collaborationist forces were included while laborers who died or were injured as a result of forced labor under the service of the Japanese or the Kuomintang were not included) (Note: There was an additional 73,934 civilian casualties which were confirmed to have been directly caused by Japanese forces but the specific year of occurrence could not be determined. These casualties were classified under the category "during the War of Resistance") Zhejiang's records further indicate the worst massacre occurred on August 25 1942 when around 300 civilians were killed by Japanese troops attacking from Songyang County. Jiangxi Province's official records provide no yearly data on civilian deaths, but note that in June 1942 Japanese troops killed more than 50 civilians in Linchuan County and another 136 villagers hiding near Xuija Village (Chinese: 徐家村) on June 19 1942. (Note: Jiangxi Province's records indicate based on incomplete statistics that a total of 313,249 civilians were killed during the war from 1937-45)

The Imperial Japanese Army had also spread cholera, typhoid, plague-infected fleas and dysentery pathogens. The Japanese biological warfare Unit 731 brought almost 300 pounds of paratyphoid and anthrax to be left in contaminated food and contaminated wells with the withdrawal of the army from areas around Yushan, Kinhwa and Futsin. This attack took place at Jinhua in Zhejiang and the Japanese soldiers inadvertently advanced in the area they spread with biological weapons and got themselves infected, leading to over 1,700 dying and 10,000 getting sick.

This information about the Japanese killing their own soldiers in the campaign came from a Japanese POW captured by Americans in 1944, who admitted that the actual Japanese death toll was far higher than the 1,700 he saw on the documents at the biological warfare headquarters, and that Japanese regularly downplayed their own casualties:

"When Japanese troops overran an area in which a [biological weapons] attack had been made during the Chekiang [Zhejiang] campaign in 1942, casualties upward from 10,000 resulted within a very brief period of time. Diseases were particularly cholera, but also dysentery and pest [bubonic plague]. Victims were usually rushed to hospitals in rear. … Statistics which POW saw at Water Supply and Purification Dept Hq [sic] at Nanking showed more than 1,700 dead, chiefly from cholera; POW believes that actual deaths were considerably higher, 'it being a common practice to pare down unpleasant figures.'"

Japan used poison gas at Quzhou during the campaign.

Japan attempted to invade Fujian via Jiangshan in Zhejiang at the battle of Xianxia pass but Japan lost over 1,000 casualties and lost the battle, failing to invade Fujian.

Chinese villagers who rescued the pilots in Zhejiang were armed with just home made muzzle loading muskets and home made muzzle loading cannon. Many regular Chinese warlord soldiers in Zhejiang also only had grenade and home made muskets.

== Chinese casualties ==
According to the statistical table of casualties from the "History of the Anti-Japanese War", the casualties of the headquarters and directly subordinate units of the 88th Army, Qiantang River Northern Army, and 21st Army, the 52nd Division, the 148th Division, three battalions of the 192nd Division, and all engineer, artillery, and communications units except for engineer and artillery units attached to the 86th Army at Quzhou were not reported and thus not included in the statistics. The NRA war history book recorded the losses of the 40th Division at 200 killed, 275 wounded, and 539 missing, the 19th Division at 204 killed, 188 wounded, and 34 missing, and the 75th Division at 384 killed, 147 wounded, 708 missing. According to Gu Zhutong's report on September 28, 1942, the 19th Division suffered 381 killed, 333 wounded, and 18 missing and the 75th Division suffered 766 killed, 302 wounded, and 1,517 missing. The same telegraph also reported the losses of the headquarters of the 28th Army which was not included in the "History of the Anti-Japanese War" at 3 wounded and 124 missing. Gu Zhutong also reported on August 4, 1942, that by August 1, the 40th Division had suffered 267 killed, 348 wounded, and 1,064 missing. An earlier report put the losses by June 30 at half for the 40th Division and two-thirds for the 75th Division while the 19th Division remained intact.

The casualties of guerrilla units such as the Loyalty and Bravery Army and Chen Tianqiao's Siming Mountain guerrilla force in Zhejiang Province, which were included in the order of battle, were not included in the casualty statistics of the war history. The casualties of the 183rd Division, New 12th Division, New 20th Division, and Jiangxi peace preservation regiments in Jiangxi Province were also not included in the statistics despite the latter unit in particular being heavily engaged. Excluding the Iwanaga task force which fought against solely the Chinese 75th Division, the other two divisions, five task forces, and one battalion of the Japanese Eleventh Army all recorded fighting against the Jiangxi peace preservation regiments with the only recorded opponent of the Hirano task force and the Takahashi battalion being that Chinese unit.

== See also ==
- Order of Battle for Zhejiang-Jiangxi Campaign (1942)
- Flying Tigers
- Unit 731
- Bombing of Tokyo
- Japanese War Crimes
