= Liu Kan =

Liu Kan may refer to:

- Personal name of Emperor Ping of Han
- Liu Kan (general)
- Liu Bingzhong
