= List of field armies of the National Revolutionary Army =

The field armies (軍) of the National Revolutionary Army were military formations of the National Revolutionary Army during the Chinese Republic. It usually exercised command over two NRA Corps and often a number of Independent Divisions and Independent Brigades and some supporting units. The Chinese Republic had 30 Armies during the Second Sino-Japanese War. The use of the Army was gradually reduced, but not eliminated, in favor of the Army Group after the 1938 reforms.

== List ==
- 19th Route Army
- Eighth Route Army
- Fourth Army
- New 1st Army
- New 6th Army
- New Fourth Army
