= Li Jue (1900) =

Chinese lieutenant-general

- Born: 10 May 1900 Yunnan Province, China
- Died: 31 July 1987 (aged 87)
- Allegiance: Republic of China; People's Republic of China
- Branch: (Republic of China (1912–1949)) National Revolutionary Army (until 1949); People's Liberation Army
- Rank: Lieutenant General
- Commands: 19th Division; 70th Army; 25th Army Group
- Conflicts: Second Sino-Japanese War; Chinese Civil War

Li Jue (1900 – 1987) (Chinese: 李觉) was a Chinese military general.

He participated in the Northern Expedition in 1926. He served as Commander-in-Chief of the 25th Army Group of the Kuomintang Government, alternate member of the Central Executive Committee of the Kuomintang, director of the Central Training Mission in Chongqing, and military attaché of the Presidential Office, and took part in the Hunan Uprising in 1949. After the founding of the People's Republic of China, he served as Deputy Commander of the 21st Corps of the People's Liberation Army, a member of the 2nd to 4th National Committee of the Chinese People's Political Consultative Conference (CPPCC), and a member of the 5th and 6th Standing Committee of the CPPCC.

== Biography ==
He came from Yunnan, and graduated from the 9th term of Baoding Military Academy in 1924. After serving as a soldier under Duan Qirui and then under Tang Shengzhi, he was promoted to the rank of company commander, and in 1923, after Tang Shengzhi's support, Li Jue got married with He Jian's eldest daughter, He Mei, and became He Jian's trusted general. Under the command of He Jian, Li Jue served as a battalion commander, regimental commander, and brigade commander, and in 1929 he also became the commander of the Changsha police. After the Battle of Changsha in 1930, he succeeded Liu Jianxu as the commander of the 19th Division, which was the basic unit of He Jian.

In the winter of 1930, he defeated the Second Red Army Corps (Chinese: 红二军团) on the southward march, and in 1931, he defeated the 7th Division of Red Army that entered Western Hunan from Guangxi. After the transfer of the Second Red Army Corps and Red Army of the 6th Corps to the west of Western Hunan, they were repulsed by the 19th Division during the fight at Jigongya. He Long and Xiao Ke realized that the Li Jue's division was not easy to deal with and could only transfer their forces to fight the weaker Anhui Army first.

During the Second Sino-Japanese War, the 19th Division was expanded into the 70th Army of the National Revolutionary Army, and he served as its commander (1937-1941). He was promoted to Commander-in-Chief of the 25th Army Group of the National Revolutionary Army (1942-1945) was once hollowed out. In the Zhejiang-Jiangxi campaign, Li Jue, who had stronger commanding ability, had to be used to come out and save the situation.

In the winter of 1948, he returned to Hunan and cooperated with Tang Shengzhi in organizing the Hunan Peaceful Self-Rescue Association (HPSRA), and became the head of the Changsha District of the HPSRA, inviting his old troops to take part in the peaceful liberation of Hunan; in March 1949, he went to Nanjing to meet with the Acting President Li Zongren, and explained to him Tang Shengzhi's attitude of supporting the peace talks, and then he moved on to Shanghai and Hong Kong to liaise with them for peaceful uprisings. After returning to Changsha, he did a lot of work for the cooperation between Tang Shengzhi and Cheng Qian, and on July 30, he became the Deputy Commander-in-Chief of the Hunan Appeasement General Command, acting as the Commander-in-Chief, and on August 5, after the peaceful liberation of Hunan, he became the head of the Advance Command of the Joint Uprising of the First Corps and the Provincial Security Forces, and he became the Deputy Commander-in-Chief of the First Corps of the People's Liberation Army of the National People's Congress, responsible for the integration work. On August 13, he took part in the "Our Understanding and Advocacy of the Present Stage of the Chinese Revolution" published in Hong Kong with Huang Shaohong, Long Yun and 44 others, and sent a telegram against Chiang Kai-shek; in December, he became the deputy commander of the 21st Corps of the Chinese People's Liberation Army. In December, he became deputy commander of the 21st PLA Corps. In the following year, he became a senior staff officer of the Central-South Military Region and a counselor of the Central-South Military and Political Commission.

From 1954, he was a member of the 2nd, 3rd and 4th sessions of the Chinese People's Political Consultative Conference (CPPCC) and deputy director of the CPPCC Secretariat. 1981, he was a member of the Standing Committee of the CPPCC, an alternate member of the third and fourth sessions of the Central Committee of the Revolutionary Committee of the Kuomintang, and a member of the 5th and 6th Standing Committee of the Chinese People's Political Consultative Conference.

He died on July 31, 1987 in Beijing after a long illness.
