= Feng Zhi'an =

Chinese general (1896–1954)

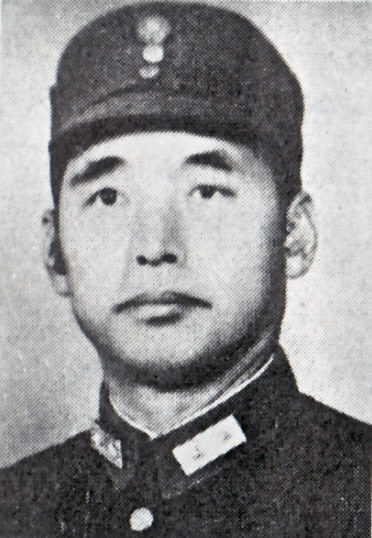
- Feng Zhi'an
- Born: 16 December 1896; Gucheng County, Zhili, Qing China
- Died: 16 December 1954 (aged 58); Taipei, Taiwan
- Military career
- Allegiance: Republic of China
- Rank: Lieutenant General
- Conflicts: Second Sino-Japanese War; Battle of Beiping-Tianjin; Tianjin-Pukou Railway Operation; Battle of Xuzhou; Battle of Wuhan; Battle of Suixian-Zaoyang; 1939-40 Winter Offensive; Battle of Zaoyang-Yichang; Central Hebei Operation; Battle of South Henan; Western Hebei Operation; Battle of West Henan-North Hubei; Chinese Civil War; Huaihai Campaign

Feng Zhi'an (traditional Chinese: 馮治安; simplified Chinese: 冯治安; Wade–Giles: Feng Chih-an; 16 December 1896 – 16 December 1954) was a Chinese lieutenant general during the Second Sino-Japanese War and Chinese Civil War.

== Biography ==
Feng was born in Hebei. He was a member of the Guominjun. He joined the National Revolutionary Army in 1926 and participated in the Northern Expedition. From 1931 to 1937, he was the general commanding 37th Division and in 1936 was made Chairman of the Government of Hebei which he held until 1938. For a time, he was acting commander of the 29th Army in 1937. Following the Battle of Beiping-Tianjin he organized and commanded the 77th Corps until 1943. Shortly afterward, he became commander of the19th Army and fought in the Tianjin–Pukou Railway Operation, the Battle of Xuzhou and the Battle of Wuhan. Later as 77th Corps commander he also served at the Battle of Suixian-Zaoyang, the 1939-40 Winter Offensive and the Battle of Zaoyang-Yichang. In 1940, he was made Commander in Chief of the 33rd Army Group which he commanded in the Central Hebei Operation, Battle of South Henan, and the Western Hebei Operation. In 1945, he was the commander-in-chief of the Northern Hebei Right Force in the Battle of West Henan-North Hubei.

During the Chinese Civil War in 1948, he was a deputy commander of the General Suppression Headquarters of Xuzhou Garrison during the Huaihai campaign. After the Kuomintang was defeated in the Chinese Civil War, he left for Taiwan.

Feng Zhi'an died of a cerebral hemorrhage in Taipei on his 58th birthday. In 1987, Feng's image was placed at the Museum of the War of Chinese People's Resistance Against Japanese Aggression, marking his rehabilitation in Mainland China.
