= Sun Du =

Chinese general (1898–1967)

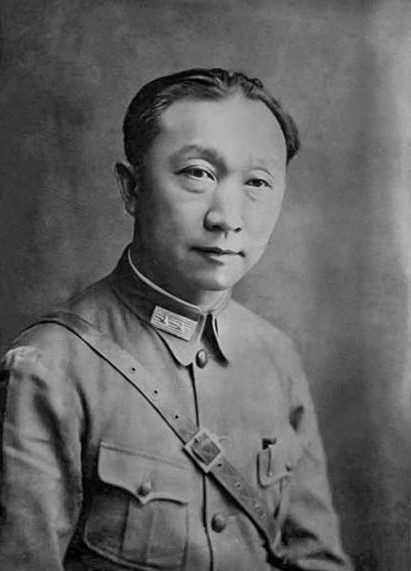
- Native name: 孫渡
- Born: 5 May 1898 Yunnan, China
- Died: April 1967 (aged 68) Kunming, People's Republic of China
- Allegiance: Republic of China
- Branch: (Republic of China (1912–1949)) National Revolutionary Army
- Rank: General
- Conflicts: Second Sino-Japanese War; Battle of Wuhan; First Battle of Changsha; Second Battle of Changsha; Third Battle of Changsha; Battle of Changsha (1944); Chinese Civil War

Sun Du (traditional Chinese: 孫渡; simplified Chinese: 孙渡; pinyin: Sūn Dù; 5 May 1898 – April 1967) was a Kuomintang general from Yunnan. While being a staff officer, he was appointed to Yunnan's Government Committee in November 1929, along with five others. As of 10 March 1931, he was Long Yun's chief of staff. While the Chinese Red Army's Long March was passing through Yunnan in April and May of 1935, Sun commanded the all-Yunnanese third column that had the task of guarding Kunming against a surprise attack. From March 1945 until September 1947, he was the commander of the 1st Army Group of the National Revolutionary Army of the Republic of China.

== See also ==
- List of Army Groups of the National Revolutionary Army
