= Liu Yinggu =

Chinese general

- Born: 1897; Zhejiang, China
- Died: 1966 (aged 68–69)
- Allegiance: Republic of China
- Branch: (Republic of China (1912–1949)) National Revolutionary Army
- Rank: Lieutenant General
- Commands: 19th Army Group
- Conflicts: Second Sino-Japanese War

Liu Yinggu (traditional Chinese: 劉膺古; simplified Chinese: 刘膺古; pinyin: Liú Yīnggǔ) (1897 – 1966) was a KMT general from Zhejiang. He was made a major general on October 16, 1936 and promoted to lieutenant general on June 24, 1938. In September 1939, he was made deputy commander-in-chief of the 19th Army Group. In March 1941, he was made deputy commander-in-chief of the 9th War Area. In December 1941, he was reappointed as deputy commander-in-chief of the 19th Army Group, before being promoted to commander in April 1942.
