= Xia Chuzhong =

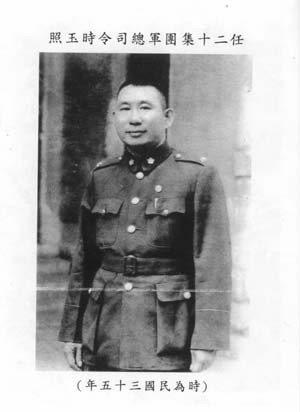
- Born: May 30, 1904; Yiyang, Hunan
- Died: December 28, 1988; Taipei, Taiwan
- Allegiance: Republic of China
- Branch: (Republic of China (1912–1949)) National Revolutionary Army
- Battles / wars: Second Sino-Japanese War; Battle of Shanghai

Xia Chuzhong (Chinese: 夏楚中; pinyin: Xià Chǔzhōng; Wade–Giles: Hsia Ch'u-chung; 30 May 1904 – 28 December 1988) was a KMT general from Yiyang, Hunan province. He participated in many battles during the Second Sino-Japanese War, including the Battle of Shanghai and the Zhejiang-Jiangxi campaign. He died in Taipei, Taiwan in 1988.
