= Liao Lei (general) =

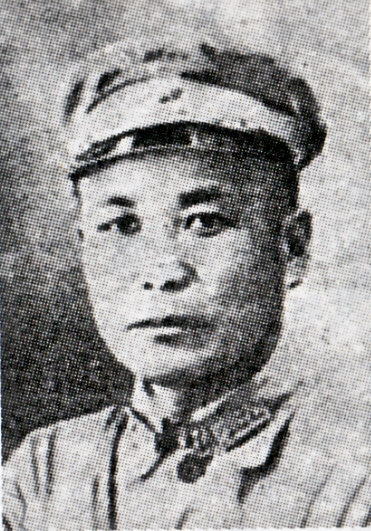
- Born: February 20, 1890; Yulin, Guangxi
- Died: October 23, 1939
- Allegiance: Republic of China
- Service / branch: National Revolutionary Army
- Commands: 21st Army Group
- Battles / wars: Second Sino-Japanese War; Battle of Shanghai; Battle of Wuhan; Battle of Xuzhou; Battle of Suixian–Zaoyang

Liao Lei (Chinese: 廖磊; pinyin: Liào Lěi) was a KMT general from Guangxi. He participated in the Battle of Shanghai, the Battle of Wuhan, and the Battle of Xuzhou and the Battle of Suixian–Zaoyang in Hubei. He died of a stroke.
