= Li Tiejun =

- 李鐵軍
- Born: 1904; Meizhou, Guangdong, Qing China
- Died: 9 June 2002 (aged 97–98); San Jose, California, United States
- Military career
- Allegiance: Republic of China
- Branch: (Republic of China (1912–1949)) National Revolutionary Army
- Rank: Lieutenant general
- Commands: 76th Army; 29th Army Group
- Conflicts: Northern Expedition; Battle of Shanghai; Ili Rebellion; Battle of Hainan Island
Li Tiejun
- Traditional Chinese: 李鐵軍
- Simplified Chinese: 李铁军
Transcriptions
Standard Mandarin
- Hanyu Pinyin: Lǐ Tiějūn
- Bopomofo: ㄌㄧˇ ㄊㄧㄝˇㄐㄩㄣ
- Wade–Giles: Li^{3} T'ieh^{3} chün^{1}
Wu
- Wugniu: Li^{6} Thiq^{7}-ciun^{1}
Hakka
- Romanization: Li^{3} Tiad^{5}-giun^{1}
- Pha̍k-fa-sṳ: Lí Thiet-kiûn
Yue: Cantonese
- Jyutping: Lei^{5} Tit^{3}-gwan^{1}
Southern Min
- Tâi-lô: Lí Thiat-kun

Li Tiejun (traditional Chinese: 李鐵軍; simplified Chinese: 李铁军; pinyin: Lǐ Tiějūn; 1904 – 9 June 2002) was a was Chinese lieutenant general who served during the Second Sino-Japanese War, the Ili Rebellion, and the Chinese Civil War. He served as commanding officer of the 3rd and 29th Army Groups, as well as other smaller units during his career.

== Biography ==
He was born in Mei County, Guangdong in 1904. He graduated from the Whampoa Military Academy and participated in the Northern Expedition. During the Battle of Shanghai, he fought against the Japanese at Wusong, Baoshan, and Yuepu.

In July 1938 he was promoted to commander of the 76th Army, and later given command of the 29th Army Group. In the spring of 1944, Li, who was stationed in the Hexi Corridor, was ordered to lead his troops in Xinjiang to help suppress the Ili Rebellion. However, his troops were defeated by the Turkic rebels. Li commanded the garrison at Hexi Corridor until 1947, when the 29th Army Group was transferred to Henan by Hu Zongnan's orders to fight against the Chinese Communists. The Nationalist troops were defeated, with Li leading a breakout from Henan. He was later given a position in Hainan, and in 1950 left for Taiwan following the Communist capture of the island.

In Taiwan, Li became a member of the Ministry of National Defense. He later left for the United States and died in California in June 2002.
