= Wang Zhonglian =

Kuomintang general

- Born: 1904; Xiao County, Xuzhou, Jiangsu (now part of Suzhou, Anhui)
- Died: 1991; Taipei, Taiwan
- Allegiance: Republic of China
- Service / branch: (Republic of China (1912–1949)) National Revolutionary Army
- Rank: lieutenant general
- Commands: 89th Division; 85th Army; 19th Army Group; 31st Army Group; 26th Army
- Battles / wars: Second Sino-Japanese War; Battle of Taiyuan; Battle of Central Henan; Battle of West Henan–North Hubei; Chinese Civil War

Wang Zhonglian (王仲廉) (1904–1991) was a KMT general from Jiangsu. His birthplace became part of Anhui in 1950. He was a graduate of the Whampoa Military Academy. He fought against the Imperial Japanese Army in Shanxi, Henan and Hubei. He commanded the 19th Army Group from April to September 1943 and the 31st Army Group from September 1943 to December 1946. He was later demoted to commander of the 26th Army, a position he held until July 1947. In August 1947, he was removed from command. In 1949, after the end of the Chinese Civil War, he immigrated to Taiwan, where he lived for the rest of his life.
