= Li Wen (general) =

Republic of China general (1905–1977)

- Native name: 李文
- Born: November 26, 1905; Xinhua County, Hunan, Qing China
- Died: April 20, 1977 (aged 71) Taipei, Taiwan
- Allegiance: Republic of China
- Branch: National Revolutionary Army
- Service years: 1924–1964
- Conflicts: Northern Expedition: Second Sino-Japanese War; Battle of Shanghai; Battle of Lanfeng; Battle of Wuhan; Chinese Civil War; Pingjin campaign; Chengdu campaign

Li Wen (Chinese: 李文; pinyin: Lǐ Wén; November 26, 1905 – April 20, 1977) was a Chinese National Revolutionary Army general during the Second Sino-Japanese War and the Chinese Civil War.

== Biography ==
Li Wen was born in Xinhua County, Hunan in 1905. He joined the Kuomintang's National Revolutionary Army during the Northern Expedition. After the outbreak of the Second Sino-Japanese War, he commanded the 78th Division in the Battle of Shanghai, the Battle of Lanfeng and the Battle of Wuhan.

Following the end of the war with Japan, Li was stationed in Hebei. Near the end of the Pingjin campaign, he along with Shi Jue, attempted to dissuade Fu Zuoyi from surrendering Beiping to the communists. When this failed, Li and Shi escaped to Nanjing. He was later assigned a position in Sichuan. In December 1949, he was captured by the People's Liberation Army following the communist victory in the Chengdu campaign. He was sent to a camp in Chongqing, but escaped to British Hong Kong in 1950. He then went to Taiwan, where he served in the Ministry of National Defense until his retirement in 1964. He later became a consultant for a sugar company.

Li died at the Taipei Veterans General Hospital at the age of 71, and was buried at the Yangmingshan First Cemetery in Beitou District, Taipei.
