= Zeng Wanzhong =

- Born: 1894; Yunnan Province, China
- Died: 1968
- Allegiance: Republic of China
- Service / branch: (Republic of China (1912–1949)) National Revolutionary Army
- Rank: Lieutenant General
- Commands: 5th Army Group
- Battles / wars: Second Sino-Japanese War; 1939–40 Winter Offensive; Battle of South Shanxi

Zeng Wanzhong (traditional Chinese: 曾萬鐘; simplified Chinese: 曾万钟; pinyin: Zēng Wànzhōng) (1894 – 1968) was a KMT general from Yunnan. He was made a lieutenant general in April 1935.

When his unit, the 3rd Army of the National Army, was placed under the command of the Communist Eighth Route Army in 1938, Zeng urged his officers and soldiers to focus on defeating the Japanese invasion.

He commanded the 5th Army Group from February 1939 to March 1942. He fought against the Imperial Japanese Army in Shanxi.
