= Li Xingzhong =

Chinese KMT general

- Born: 12 January 1890; Zhili (modern Hebei)
- Died: 24 July 1962 (aged 72) Beijing, People's Republic of China
- Allegiance: Republic of China
- Branch: (Republic of China (1912–1949)) National Revolutionary Army
- Commands: 4th Army Group
- Conflicts: Second Sino-Japanese War; Chinese Civil War

Li Xingzhong (李興中) (12 January 1890 – 24 July 1962) was a Chinese general from Zhili Province who fought for the Kuomintang government. He graduated from the Baoding Military Academy in 1914. He was a loyal supporter of Feng Yuxiang and, like Feng, opposed Chiang Kai-shek's personal consolidation of power. During the Xi'an Incident, he supported Zhang Xueliang and Yang Hucheng. He commanded the 4th Army Group from June 1945 to March 1947. He stayed on the mainland after the communist victory.
