= Zhang Xuezhong (general) =

- Born: 15 July 1899; Leping, Jiangxi, Qing China
- Died: 16 June 1995 (aged 95) Taipei, Taiwan
- Allegiance: Republic of China
- Branch: (Republic of China (1912–1949)) National Revolutionary Army
- Service years: 1927–1959
- Rank: General
- Conflicts: Second Sino-Japanese War; Nankou Campaign; Battle of Tengxian; Battle of Taierzhuang; Chinese Civil War

Zhang Xuezhong (Chinese: 張雪中; Wade–Giles: Chang Hsüeh-chung; 15 July 1899 – 16 June 1995) was a Republic of China general who commanded a division in the important Battle of Taierzhuang. He also worked in the Taiwanese Ministry of National Defence later in his career.

== Career ==
Zhang was born in Leping, Jiangxi. He started his military career in November 1927 at 3rd battalion of Zhejiang Military Academy. He fought in multiple battles including Battle of Tengxian, Nankou Campaign and Battle of Taierzhuang during the Second Sino-Japanese War. The 89th division led by Zhang was one of the Chinese divisions modernized by Germans. Zhang was part of the 13th army's staff from March 1937 to July 1942.

Zhang also commanded his 89th division in the 1938 Battle of Taierzhuang, which was the first major Chinese victory in the Second Sino-Japanese War. He also fought to defend the Gaochengzhen–Taerwan line from April to May 1939.

In August 1948 Zhang started working as a counselor in the Ministry of National Defence, and a month later he was promoted to the rank of General. This was his last promotion in military ranks. Zhang retired in January 1959, and died in Taipei on 16 June 1995.

== See also ==
- List of army groups of the National Revolutionary Army
- Sino-German cooperation until 1941
