= Liu Jianxu =

Kuomintang general (1892–1978)

- 劉建緒
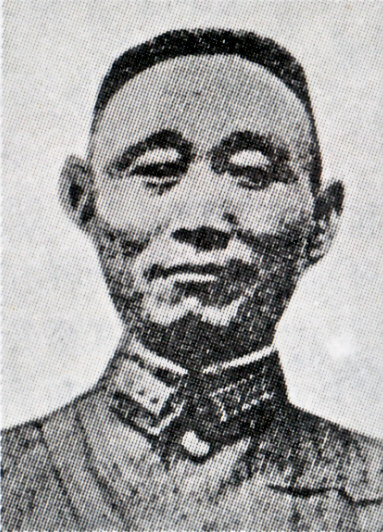

Governor of Fujian
- In office 28 August 1941 – 16 September 1948
- Preceded by: Chen Yi
- Succeeded by: Li Liang-jung

Personal details
- Born: 2 October 1892 Liling, Hunan, Qing Dynasty
- Died: 22 March 1978 (aged 85) Brazil
- Party: Kuomintang

Liu Jianxu (traditional Chinese: 劉建緒; simplified Chinese: 刘建绪; pinyin: Liú Jiànxù; 2 October 1892 – 22 March 1978), art-name Huixian (恢先), courtesy name Ziyang (子養), was a KMT general from Liling, Hunan. He participated in the Battle of Shanghai in 1937 in command of the 10th Army Group of the East Chekiang Garrison Sector. He went to Hong Kong in 1949 before immigrating to Brazil in 1951.
