= Tang Shizun =

Chinese general (1885–1950)

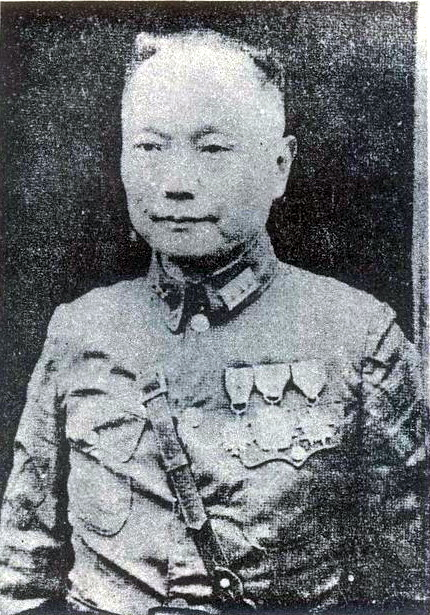

Tang Shizun (唐式遵) (1885 – 27 March 1950) was a KMT general from Sichuan during World War II.

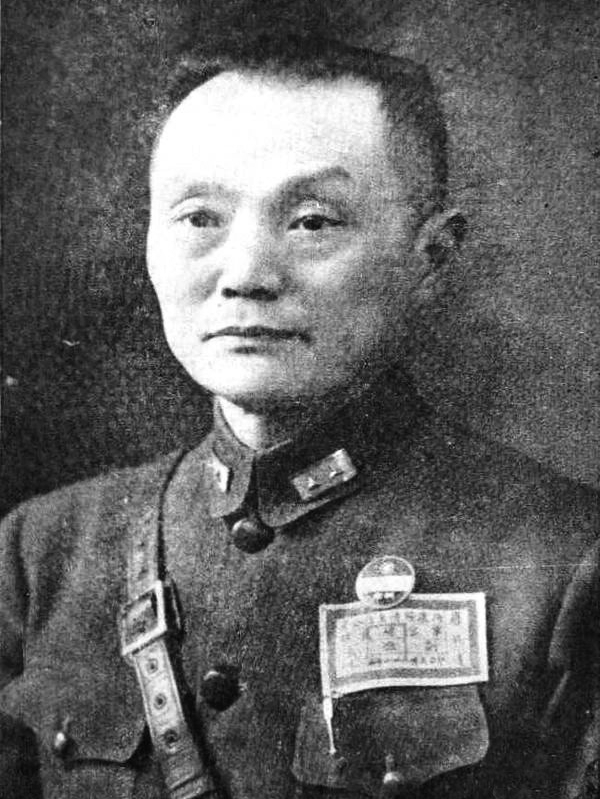

== Military/Government Positions ==
From 1926 to 1932 Shizun served as General Officer Commanding 1st Division, 21st Army. In 1935 he was promoted to Commander of the entire 21st Army. He served this position until 1939, when he became Commander in Chief of the 23rd Army Group. During this time, he also served as Deputy Commander in Chief for the 3rd War Area. After taking a four-year hiatus starting in 1945, he gained the office of Chairman of the Sichuan Provincial Government. He died in office in 1950.
