= Li Pinxian =

Chinese general (1890–1987)

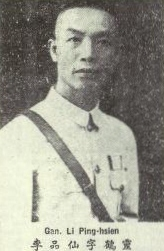
- "General Li Ping-hsien"; Who's Who in China 5th ed. (1936)
- Born: 22 April 1890; Cangwu County, Wuzhou, Guangxi
- Died: 23 March 1987 (aged 96) Taipei, Taiwan
- Allegiance: Republic of China
- Branch: (Republic of China (1912–1949)) National Revolutionary Army
- Service years: 1912–1952
- Conflicts: Wuchang Uprising; Constitutional Protection War; Northern Expedition; Chiang-Gui War; Central Plains War; Second Sino-Japanese War; Chinese Civil War

Li Pinxian (Chinese: 李品仙; pinyin: Lǐ Pǐnxiān; April 22, 1890 – March 23, 1987) was a Republic of China Army general from Cangwu County, Guangxi. His career spanned the Xinhai Revolution, Warlord Era, the Second-Sino Japanese War, and the Chinese Civil War. After the loss of the mainland to the Chinese Communist Party in 1949, he left for Taiwan.

== Early life ==
Li Pinxian was born in Cangwu County, Guangxi in 1890. In 1907, he entered the Guangxi Army Primary School created by general Cai E. In 1910, he was promoted to the second phase of the Hubei Third Army Middle School. The following year, after the Wuchang Uprising broke out, Li Pinxian joined the revolutionaries. Later, Li returned to his hometown and served as a member of the Ordnance Bureau of Wuzhou. In 1913, he entered the first phase of Baoding Army Officer School. He graduated the next year and returned to his hometown. In 1916, Li was transferred to the Hunan Army. Later, under Tang Shengzhi, a classmate of Baoding Military Academy, he participated in the Constitutional Protection Movement.

== Career ==
In 1924, he served as the brigade commander of the Eighth Brigade of the Fourth Division of the Hunan Army. In June 1926, Tang Shengzhi and the forces under his command joined the National Revolutionary Army, and Li Pinxian served as the third division commander of the Eighth Army of the National Revolutionary Army. During the Northern Expedition, he led the NRA troops to occupy all of Hunan and contributed to the defeat of Wu Peifu's army in Hubei. In February 1927, he served as the deputy commander of the Eighth Army; in April he was promoted to commander, concurrently serving as the commander-in-chief of the three towns of Wuhan and the member of the Hubei Provincial Government. After the outbreak of the Chinese Civil War and the purge of communists Shanghai on April 12, 1927, Li supported Chiang Kai-shek to suppress the Chinese Communist Party (CCP).

=== New Guangxi clique ===
In October 1927, during the conflict between Wang Jingwei's Wuhan government and Chiang Kai-shek's Nanjing government, Li Pinxian supported Tang Shengzhi, who was defeated by Li Zongren of the New Guangxi clique. Li Pinxian joined the New Guangxi clique in February 1928. In April, he served as the commander of the 12th Army of the Fourth Army of the National Revolutionary Army and the commander of the 8th Army. Afterwards, he went northward again and defeated the 30,000 strong force of the Zhilu Coalition Army in Luanhe and stayed in Tangshan. In March 1929, the Chiang-Gui War between the New Guangxi Clique and Chiang Kai-shek's forces, broke out and Chiang Kai-shek again used Tang Shengzhi's forces. Li Pinxian returned to Tang Shengzhi's army and served as deputy commander of the 5th Route Army and commander of the 8th Army. In the summer of the same year, the army moved to Henan, Li Pinxian left due to an illness, and Liu Xing served as the commander of the army.

At the end of 1929, Tang Shengzhi announced his split from Chiang Kai-shek. In January 1930, Tang Shengzhi defeated Li Pinxian and went to British Hong Kong. After the outbreak of the Central Plains War, Li Pinxian should be recruited by the new Guangxi clique and served as the supervisor of the operation of Hunan. The Central Plains War resulted in the defeat of the New Guangxi clique, and Li Pinxian returned to Guangxi and served as Chief of Staff of the 4th Army Command. From then on, Li served as the principal of the Nanning Military Officer School, the Guangxi Border Defense Supervision Office and the administrative supervision of Zuojiang District, as well as the commander of the Longzhou District Civil Corps. In 1935, he once again served as chief of staff of the 4th Army Command. In January 1936, he was promoted to lieutenant general, and in July he served as deputy director of the Guangxi Suijing Office. In March 1937, he was awarded the rank of General.

== Second Sino-Japanese War ==
In July 1937, the Second Sino-Japanese War broke out. In December, Li Pinxian served as deputy commander-in-chief of the fifth theater (commander-in-chief Li Zongren) and commander-in-chief of the Eleventh Army (three jurisdictions). He fought in the Battle of Shanghai, Battle of Xuzhou, and the Battle of Taierzhuang. In June 1938, he participated in the Battle of Wuhan and served as the commander of the Fourth Army Corps of the Wuhan Defense Army. In October of the same year, the Japanese army captured Wuhan after a 4-month battle. Afterwards, the Chinese forces under Li's command went to Hubei Province to reorganize. In April 1939, he participated in the Battle of Suixian-Zaoyang and fought against four Japanese divisions, attempting to halt the Japanese offensive.

In November 1939, Li Pinxian was appointed as the Chairman of the Anhui Provincial Government, the Commander-in-Chief of the 21st Army Group and Commander-in-Chief of the Henan-Anhui Border Region. He contributed to the formation of Anhui's anti-Japanese defenses. In May 1940, he fought in the Second Battle of Suixian-Zaoyang and the Second Battle of Changsha in August 1941. On the other hand, Li Pinxian also strongly suppressed the CCP, and the relationship with the Communist led New Fourth Army became tense. In January 1941, the military headquarters of the New Fourth Army was surrounded and wiped out by Nationalist forces, which become known as the Wannan Incident. Before the incident, Li Pinxian's blockade of New Fourth Army in Jiangbei had an important impact on results of the conflict. On June 28, 1943, the Nationalist Government promoted Li Pinxian to the head of the Anhui Provincial County Commission. Due to his military achievements, in January 1945, Li Pinxian was promoted to commander-in-chief of the Tenth Theater District. In June, he was elected as the sixth Central Executive Committee of the Kuomintang. At the end of the Second Sino-Japanese War, Li Pinxian was responsible for the surrender of the Japanese army in Xuzhou, Jiangsu.

== Chinese Civil War ==
In April 1946, Li Pinxian served as the chairman of the Anhui Provincial Government; in the same year, he also served as the deputy director of the Xuzhou Suijing Office. On July 19, 1947, the Nationalist Government promoted Li Pinxian to the chairman of the Anhui Election Office; the Nationalist Government also appointed him as a representative of the National Assembly and a legislator of the Legislative Yuan. In 1948, Li Zongren was elected as Vice President of the Republic of China, and Li Pinxian offered him support In the same year, Li Pinxian served as the deputy chief of the Huazhong Military and Political Office (Chief Executive Bai Chongxi).

In May 1949, he served as Director of Guilin Suijing Office. On June 1, Li Pinxian, director of the Suijing Office of Guangxi, called Lu Han, chairman of the Yunnan Provincial Government, that the Guizhou Army No. 303 Division was stationed in Baise and was ready to enter Yunnan to "assist bandits"; The appeasement headquarters in the border area, with Zhang Guangwei as its commander, placing Yunnan into the defense area of the Guangxi Army. Li Pinxian was the chairman of the Guangxi Provincial Government, but was unable to stop the offensive of the Chinese People's Liberation Army and went to Taiwan in December 1949.

== Later life ==
He went to Taiwan in 1949 and served as an advisor to the Presidential Strategy Advisory Committee. He retired in 1953, and served as the governor of Shuiyuanli in Taipei. On March 23, 1987, Li Pinxian died in Taipei at the age of 96.
