= Battle of Suixian–Zaoyang =

1939 battle of the Second Sino-Japanese War

Coordinates: 32.1252°N 112.7510°E

- Part of the Second Sino-Japanese War and the interwar period
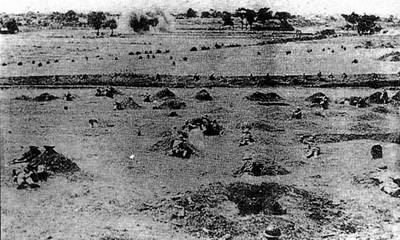
- NRA troops in an attack
Date	April 20 – May 24, 1939 (1 month and 4 days)
Location	Vicinities of Suizhou city and Zaoyang city in Hubei province, Republic of China
Result	Chinese victory

Belligerents
(Republic of China (1912–1949)) Republic of China	Empire of Japan

Commanders and leaders
(Republic of China (1912–1949)) Li Zongren (Republic of China (1912–1949)) Zhang Gan	(Empire of Japan) Yasuji Okamura

Strength
220,000 troops in 2 armies: Right Flank Army; 29th Army Group; 33rd Army Group; Left Flank Army; 11th Army Group; 4 other Army Groups; 31st Army Group; 21st Army Group; 2nd Army Group; 22nd Army Group; River Defense Force	113,000 troops in 3 divisions: 3rd Division; 13th Division; 16th Division; 4th Cavalry Brigade

Casualties and losses
Chinese claim : 28,037 killed or wounded. (Note: Not including the 21st Group Army); 21st Group Army : 1,621 casualties. Japanese claim : 17,500 killed 1,607 captured	Chinese claim : 21,450 killed or wounded Japanese claim : 652 killed 1,816 wounded

The Battle of Suixian–Zaoyang (simplified Chinese: 随枣会战; traditional Chinese: 隨棗會戰; pinyin: Suízǎo Huìzhàn), also known as the Battle of Suizao, was one of the 22 major engagements between the National Revolutionary Army (NRA) and Imperial Japanese Army (IJA) during the Second Sino-Japanese War. The Japanese launched a major two-pronged offensive that captured many cities and towns. However, their failure to defend against a series of coordinated Chinese counter-attacks forced them to completely withdraw, resulting in territorial control returning to the original status quo.

== The battle ==
At the end of April 1939, Japanese commanders sought to capitalise on their gains from their successful capture of Wuhan, as well as to relieve pressure on their base in the newly captured city. Thus, they deployed 113,000 troops in three divisions and one cavalry brigade to launch two simultaneous attacks on the cities of Suizhou and Zaoyang, along the Xiangyang-Huayuan Highway and Jingshan-Zhongxiang Highway respectively.

Japanese commander General Yasuji Okamura deployed the 13th and 16th Divisions from Zhongxiang to drive northwards along the Dahong mountain ranges and attack Zaoyang from the south on 1 May 1939. Zaoyang was protected by the Chinese 77th Corps. The single Chinese corps held fast against the fierce attack by the two Japanese divisions.

On 3 May, Japanese commander Lieutenant General Yamawaki Masataka dispatched the 3rd Division and 4th Cavalry Brigade to attack Suixian and Tongbai from Yingshan and Xinyang respectively in an attempt to encircle Tang Enbo and Li Pingxian's 11th and 31st Army Groups. Four days later, the 13th and 16th Divisions broke through Chinese 77th Corps' defensive lines, and successfully captured Zaoyang. By 12 May, the two Japanese divisions had also captured Tanghe, Nanyang and Xinye.

However, the Japanese were less successful in the Tongbai mountain ranges, where they faced the Chinese 13th, 84th, and 85th Corps, led by NRA commanders Zhang Zhen, Qin Lianfang, and Wang Zhonglian respectively. Here the Chinese succeeded in checking the Japanese offensive, preventing them from linking their two advancing columns.

Simultaneously, the Chinese 2nd and 33rd Army Groups, led by Sun Zhen and Zhang Zizhong respectively, arrived at the battlefield. They moved eastwards, crossing the Hanshui River and attacked the Japanese 13th and 16th Divisions' western flank. Meanwhile, Tang Enbo's 31st Army Group moved north from San Taidian to Miyang, before maneuvering northwest around Nanyang, and moving southwest to Xinye, attacking the Japanese there head-on, inflicting heavy casualties and forcing them to retreat. The Chinese then launched a coordinated counter-offensive, whereupon the various Japanese units were forced to withdraw. By May 20, the Chinese had recaptured all previously lost territory.

== Aftermath ==
During the month-long campaign, the Chinese incurred a total of 28,000 casualties, a significant portion of which was due to the Japanese Army's continuous and extensive use of air attacks and chemical weapons. On the other hand, the Chinese claimed that the Japanese suffered 21,000 casualties. Although Chinese casualties were claimed to still be a third greater than that of the Japanese, it was clear from the Chinese's perspective that by now the casualty margin was getting smaller and smaller.

Although the Japanese were initially successful in capturing many cities and towns, their inability to hold onto any of them resulted in their offensive operation ending in a complete failure. By the end of the battle, the Chinese Army had not only recaptured all positions, but also gained the ability to utilize mobilized warfare to launch counter-offensives into Japanese-held territory.

== Chinese casualties ==
The "History of the Anti-Japanese War" recorded the Chinese Army suffering 28,037 killed or wounded, including 556 from the 2nd Group Army in East Henan and South Hubei Front, 22,328 from the 11th and 31st Group Armies in the Suixian-Zaoyang Front, 4,476 from the 22nd and 33rd Group Armies of the Right Flank Army in the Jing-Zhong Front, and 677 from the 29th Group Army in the Han-Yi Front, with no records of the number of missing. According to the statistics of the Right Flank Army, the 22nd and 33rd Group Armies suffered a total of 4,476 killed or wounded and 3,222 missing in the battle of Suizao.

Among the units in the Suixian-Zaoyang Front, the 173rd, 174th, and 189th Divisions of the 84th Army were specified by the "History of the Anti-Japanese War" as suffering approximately more than 5,800 killed or wounded. According to Li Huaicang's telegraph on June 9, 1939, the casualties of the 84th Army reached more than 7,500. According to the Fifth War Zone's casualty statistics in the battle of Suizao, two divisions of the 84th Army of the 11th Group Army suffered 2,482 killed, 2,782 wounded, and 1,131 missing while the 189th Division of the 84th Army which for this casualty statistics was considered separate from the 84th Army suffered 852 killed, 627 wounded, and 1,033 missing. The Chinese Ministry of Military Affairs had a different casualty statistics with 4,314 soldiers of the three divisions of the 84th Army killed in action in May 1939. According to statistics of the 31st Group Army, the group army suffered 4,762 killed and 10,019 wounded in the battle of Suizao, including 2,531 killed and 6,471 wounded from the 13th Army. According to a post-war commemoration of the war dead, 3,870 were recorded as killed in action from the 13th Army in the "Second Battle of South Hubei". According to the 11th Group Army commander's report on June 10, 1939, the 39th Army suffered 618 killed, 1,154 wounded, 235 missing, and 122 unspecified killed, wounded or missing in the battle of Suizao.

For the East Henan and South Hubei Front, the Chinese Ministry of Military Affairs recorded the losses of the 68th Army alone in May 1939 at 412 soldiers killed. The 88th Regiment of the 30th Division of the 30th Army was also recorded to have suffered heavy casualties and the Xinye County team suffered at least over 200 casualties in the battle. The losses of the 41st Division in late May was not included in the statistics of casualties in the Han-Yi Front, where the division suffered over 320 casualties at Luohan Temple. The casualties of the 21st Group Army were not included in the statistics nor were the casualties of peace preservation, guerilla, and self-defense units attached to the group army included.

== Gallery ==
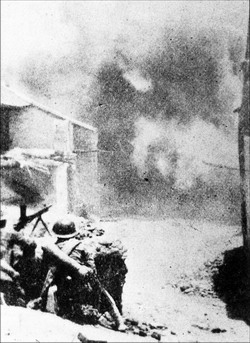
Street fighting in the cities.
