= Liu Kan (general) =

Chinese general (1906–1948)

- Born: 1906; Hunan
- Died: 3 March 1948 (aged 41–42) Shaanxi
- Allegiance: Republic of China
- Branch: (Republic of China (1912–1949)) National Revolutionary Army
- Service years: 1923–1948
- Commands: 83rd Division; 93rd Corps
- Conflicts: Northern Expedition; Central Plains War; Second Sino-Japanese War; Defense of the Great Wall; Peiking–Suiyuan Railway Operation; Battle of South Shanxi; Operation Ichi-Go; Chinese Civil War; Third Encirclement Campaign against Jiangxi Soviet; Battle of Shajiadian

Liu Kan (traditional Chinese: 劉戡; simplified Chinese: 刘戡; pinyin: Liú Kān; 1906 – 3 March 1948) was a KMT general from Hunan. He committed suicide in 1948 after the division he was commanding was annihilated.
