= Sun Tongxuan =

Army general

- Born: 1895; Jiaohe County, Zhili, Qing China (now Botou, Hebei)
- Died: September 30, 1978 (aged 82–83) Beijing, China
- Allegiance: Republic of China
- Branch: (Republic of China (1912–1949)) National Revolutionary Army
- Service years: 1916 - 1943
- Commands: 3rd Army Group
- Conflicts: Second Sino-Japanese War; Battle of Wuhan; 1939–40 Winter Offensive; Battle of South Henan

Sun Tongxuan (traditional Chinese: 孫桐萱; simplified Chinese: 孙桐萱; Wade–Giles: Sun Tung-hsuan); 1895 - 30 September 1978) was a National Revolutionary Army general during the Second Sino-Japanese War.

== Biography ==
Sun was born in Zhili in 1895. He joined Feng Yuxiang's Guominjun in 1916. After the Northern Expedition, Sun became the deputy commander of the 20th Division under Han Fuju. In 1929, when Feng rebelled against Chiang Kai-shek in the Central Plains War Sun and Han defected to Chiang's faction. Later, he became the commander of the 20th Division and was promoted to lieutenant general in 1935.

After the outbreak of the Second Sino-Japanese War, Sun was promoted to the commander of the 12th Army. After Han Fuqu was executed in 1938, Sun was promoted to the deputy commander of the 3rd Army Group; he served at the Battle of Wuhan and the Battle of South Henan. In 1943, he was dismissed from the military after being accused of collaborating with the Chinese Communists. Sun then was placed under house arrest in Chongqing.

After the end of the war with Japan, he lived in seclusion in Beijing. He died on 30 September 1978.
