= Liu Mao'en =

Chinese general

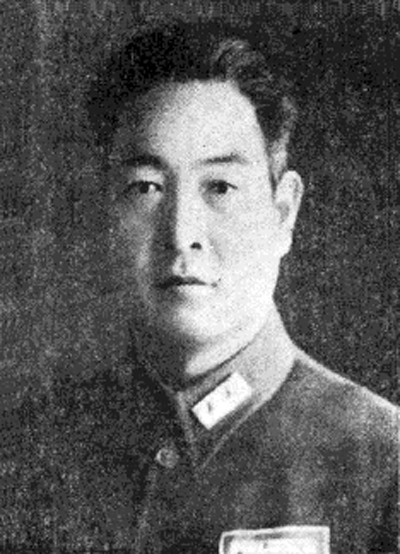
- Born: 8 June 1898; Gongyi, Henan Province, China
- Died: 24 April 1981 (aged 82); Taipei, Taiwan
- Allegiance: Republic of China
- Service / branch: (Republic of China (1912–1949)) National Revolutionary Army
- Battles / wars: Second Sino-Japanese War
- Alma mater: Baoding Military Academy

Liu Mao'en (simplified Chinese: 刘茂恩; traditional Chinese: 劉茂恩; pinyin: Liú Mào'ēn; 8 June 1898 – 24 April 1981) was a Kuomintang (Chinese Nationalist Party) general from Gong County, Henan, who commanded the 14th Army Group when the Second Sino-Japanese War broke out.

== Service record ==
- 1898, Born
- 1937, Lieutenant general, Commander, 15 Army
- 1941, Commander, 14 Army Group
- 1944, Commander, Henan Province Garrison
- 1944, Chairman, Henan Province
- 1981, Dies
