= Ye Zhao =

Chinese general (1892-1953)

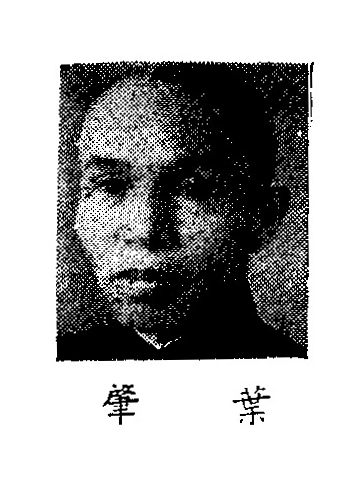
- Native name: 葉肇
- Born: 1892 Xinxing County, Guangdong, Qing China
- Died: 7 February 1953 (aged 60–61) Taipei, Taiwan
- Allegiance: Republic of China
- Branch: (Republic of China (1912–1949)) National Revolutionary Army
- Commands: 160th Division; 66th Corps; 37th Army Group
- Battles / wars: Second Sino-Japanese War; Battle of Shanghai; Battle of South Guangxi; Battle of Kunlun Pass

Ye Zhao (traditional Chinese: 葉肇; simplified Chinese: 叶肇; Wade–Giles: Yeh Chao; 1892 - 7 February 1953) was a Chinese National Revolutionary Army general during the Second Sino-Japanese War.

== Biography ==
Ye was born in Xinxing County, Guangdong in 1892. He graduated from the Baoding Military Academy in 1919. He first served under Wu Peifu before joining the Guangdong Army in 1921. In 1937, he fought at the Battle of Shanghai. During the Nationalist withdrawal from Shanghai, Ye obtained a set of used peasant clothes from a deserted farm building west of the building, and was conscripted as a porter by the advancing Japanese, who had no idea of his real identity. He survived and eventually made his way back to Shanghai. Ye commanded the 21st group in November 1939 and was detained in April 1940 following the army's loss at the Battle of Kunlun Pass. In 1949, he went to Hong Kong and later settled in Taiwan. He died in Taipei in 1953.
