= Battle of West Henan–North Hubei =

1945 ROC–Japan battle

Battle of West Henan-North Hubei
- Part of the Second Sino-Japanese War of World War II
Date	March 21 – May 11, 1945 (1 month, 2 weeks and 6 days)
Location	Western part of Henan province and Northern part of Hubei province in the Republic of China
Result	Stalemate
Territorial changes	Japan seizes Laohekou airbase in Hubei

Belligerents
(Republic of China (1912–1949)) China	(Empire of Japan) Japan

Commanders and leaders
(Republic of China (1912–1949)) Hu Zongnan (Republic of China (1912–1949)) Liu Zhi	(Empire of Japan) Sinnosuke Sasaki (Empire of Japan) Takashi Takamori

Strength
5 army group 4 airforce group	7 divisions 5 brigades 100+ tanks 13 armoured cars 1,000+ vehicles

Casualties and losses
From 21 March until 18 July 1945 : 474 officers and 18,403 soldiers killed 903 officers and 15,699 soldiers wounded 190 officers and 6,312 soldiers missing	Chinese claim : ~16,000 dead and wounded

The Battle of West Henan–North Hubei (simplified Chinese: 豫西鄂北会战; traditional Chinese: 豫西鄂北會戰; pinyin: Yù Xī È Běi Huìzhàn) was one of the 22 major engagements between the National Revolutionary Army and Imperial Japanese Army during the Second Sino-Japanese War. It was fought in March–May 1945 in northern Hubei and western Henan. While it was a tactical stalemate, the Japanese forces at Laohekou in Hubei seized control of the local airbase, denying Chinese forces any localized air support, after heavy fighting from 22 March to 8 April. Japan lost a failed counteroffensive in fighting against Chinese north of Xixia in Henan from 5 April to 10 May.

== Battles of Laohekou in Hubei ==
On 22 March, the 110th and 115th divisions of the Japanese 12th army in the I War Zone attacked west towards Laohekou airbase and Laohekou town, avoiding Nanyang where the Chinese 143rd division was. Laohekou airbase was attacked by the Japanese 4th Cavalry brigade and 3rd armoured division from the centre, and by the 110th Division from its north. The airbase was taken by the 4th cavalry brigade on 27 March, but the Chinese 125th division in Laohekou town itself repulsed repeated Japanese assaults on the town by the Japanese 4th cavalry brigade, which suffered heavy casualties. Japan was forced to call for the Japanese 39th division to march from the south to stop Chinese reinforcements on 28 March. Japan then attacked Laohekou town again on 7 April with all its strength and only occupied it on 8 April.

== Battles in Henan ==
The 68th, 85th and 89th Armies of the Chinese 31st Army Group launched an attack on 5 April against the Japanese army 110th division in an area in Henan 110km north of Xixia town. The Japanese were in trouble since they only had 6 infantry battalions so they sent an artillery battalion and 2 infantry battalions to reinforce them, but even they were not enough and Japan sent 5 more infantry battalions to stabilise the front lines against China. Japan then attempted a failed counterattack against the Chinese starting on 29 April, a Japanese military report claimed that the Chinese "inflicted tremendous casualties on the Japanese and, on 10 May, the 110th Division suspended its attack in order to re-form its line, Taking advantage of this opportunity, the enemy attacked but this time the Japanese succeeded in pushing them back."

At Xixiakou over 3,000 Japanese were reported killed by 9 May. Only a few hundred Japanese survived the battle, which took place west of Xixiakou city by 7 miles on a road, where the Japanese were pinned down south of the road on 4-7 May. 600 horses were also killed.

== Sources ==
- Hsu Long-hsuen and Chang Ming-kai, History of The Sino-Japanese War (1937–1945) 2nd Ed., 1971. Translated by Wen Ha-hsiung, Chung Wu Publishing; 33, 140th Lane, Tung-hwa Street, Taipei, Taiwan Republic of China. Pg. 452–57. Map 43.
- 抗日战争时期的侵华日军序列沿革 (Order of battle of the Japanese army that invaded China during the Sino Japanese War)
