= Liu Wenhui =

Chinese general and warlord (1895–1976)

- 刘文辉
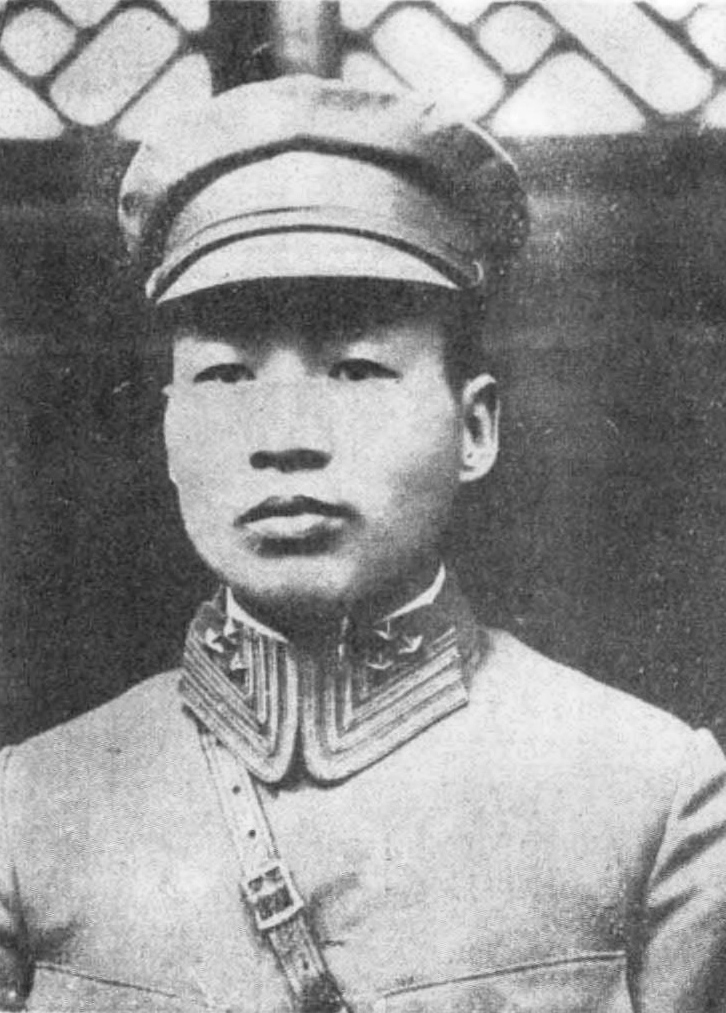
- Liu Wenhui in 1929 as Governor of Sichuan

Governor of Xikang
- In office 1 January 1939 – 9 December 1949
- Preceded by: Office established
- Succeeded by: He Guoguang

Governor of Sichuan
- In office 12 March 1929 – 21 December 1934
- Succeeded by: Liu Xiang

Personal details
- Born: 10 January 1895 Dayi County, Sichuan, Qing Empire
- Died: 24 June 1976 (aged 81) Beijing, China
- Party: Kuomintang (1926–1949); China Democratic League (1944–1949); Revolutionary Committee of the Chinese Kuomintang (1948–1976)
- Spouses: Lady Gao (m. 1914, separated); Li Zhuqian (m. 1917); Yan Yunguang (m. 1924)
- Relations: Liu Wencai (brother); Liu Xiang (nephew)
- Children: Liu Yuankai; Liu Yuanyun
- Education: Baoding Military Academy
- Awards: Order of Liberation, 1st Class
- Nickname: King of Xikang

Military service
- Allegiance: (Republic of China (1912–1949)) Republic of China; China
- Years of service: 1916–1954
- Rank: General
- Unit: 24th Army, National Revolutionary Army
- Commands: Chairman of Xikang Provincial Government
- Battles/wars: Sichuan-Yunnan War; Sino-Tibetan War; Two-Liu War; Second Sino-Japanese War; Chinese Civil War; Long March (disputed); Chengdu Uprising

Liu Wenhui (simplified Chinese: 刘文辉; traditional Chinese: 劉文輝; pinyin: Liú Wénhuī; Wade–Giles: Liu Wen-hui; 10 January 1895 – 24 June 1976) was a Chinese general and warlord of Sichuan and Xikang provinces (Sichuan clique). At the beginning of his career, he was aligned with the Kuomintang (KMT), commanding the Sichuan-Xikang Defence Force from 1927 to 1929.

In 1929, he became Sichuan governor before being ousted by a coalition of warlords in 1933; from there, he controlled the western part of Sichuan province, then known as Xikang, ruling the area as a personal fiefdom. He maintained his autonomy from the Nationalist government and pursued development programs in the province, which he funded through the trade of opium and by maintaining cordial relations with Chiang Kai-shek during the Second Sino-Japanese War.

In 1949 he defected to the Communist forces of Mao Zedong, and went on to hold high office in the new People's Republic of China, serving as Minister of Forestry (1959–1967), member of the National People's Congress, member of the National Committee of the Chinese People's Political Consultative Conference, and member of the Central Committee of the Revolutionary Committee of the Chinese Kuomintang.

== Military career and rise to power (1895–1929) ==
=== Early life and education ===
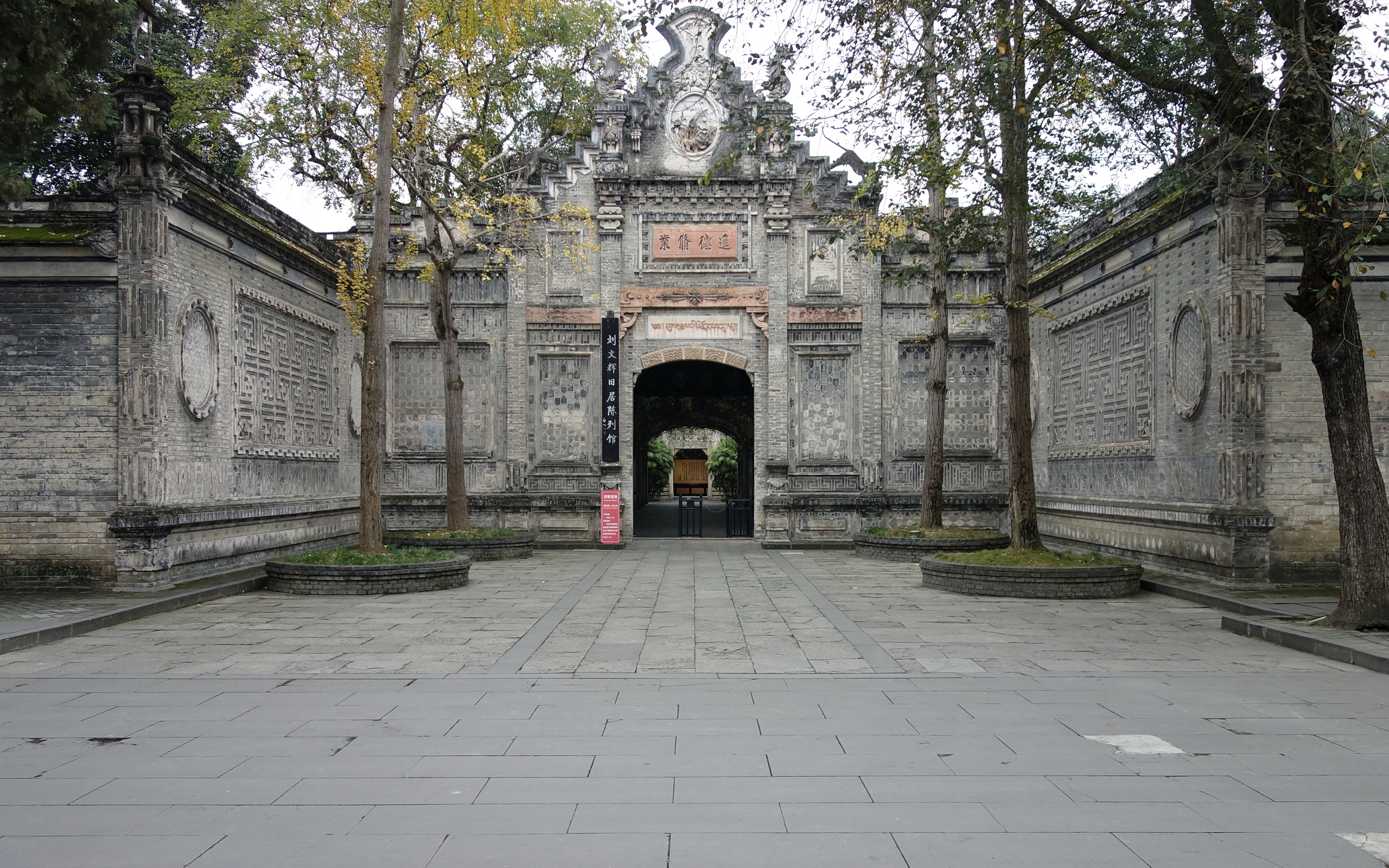
Liu Wenhui's childhood residence in Dayi County.

Liu Wenhui was born to a farming and landowning family in 1895 in Dayi County, Sichuan, as the youngest of six brothers. His parents, Liu Gongzan and Lady Gao, were described by a later biography as having a harmonious marriage. The Liu family had originally come from Huizhou in Anhui, but they had moved to Sichuan early in the Qing era. At the time of Wenhui's birth, Liu Gongzan owned a relatively large plot of one qing of land, which Liu's biography states he worked himself. Liu Wenhui's relatives included his older brother Liu Wencai, who became a major landlord in Dayi County, and his older nephew, Liu Xiang.

Liu Gongzan reportedly wanted his youngest son to enlist in the military. Liu Wenhui received his early education at a traditional school in his hometown of Anren, where he studied the Confucian classics under a local teacher. His eldest brother, Liu Wenyuan, later took over his instruction, focusing on classical literature and composition.

At age 13, Liu enrolled in the Sichuan Army Elementary School in Chengdu in 1908, part of the Qing New Army training system. He graduated in 1911 and entered the Xi'an Army Middle School, but his studies were interrupted by the Xinhai Revolution, and he returned to Sichuan. At the time, the province was also in the throes of revolutionary upheaval; Zhao Erfeng, the Qing Viceroy of Sichuan, had just been executed by Yin Changheng. Yin, a Tongmenghui member, had served as the president of the Sichuan Army Elementary School.

In 1912, Liu went to Beijing to continue his education, attending the Beijing Army Middle School and graduating in 1914. He later studied at the Baoding Military Academy, graduating in 1916 or 1917. During this time, Liu was influenced by Jiang Baili, the president of the academy and a prominent military instructor and theorist. Jiang's lessons were supposedly extremely patriotic and nationalistic in nature, to the point where he choked back tears during lectures recounting the various humiliations China had suffered.

=== Commander in Sichuan ===
After graduation, Liu Wenhui returned to Sichuan. There, Liu rejected an offer by fellow Baoding graduate Deng Xihou to serve under him. Instead, he met with his older nephew Liu Xiang, who recommended him to warlord Liu Cunhou (Note: (no relation)) of the Sichuan Army. Liu became a staff officer in Liu Cunhou's army, but before long, he had been transferred by Liu Xiang to the Eighth Division under General Chen Hongfan, stationed in Leshan. He was promoted rapidly from battalion commander to brigade commander over a period of five years from 1917 to 1922 due to the patronage of Liu Xiang.

By 1919, he, along with his close friend Leng Yindong commanded around half of Chen's forces. His performance in the 1919–20 war to expel Yunnanese forces from Sichuan earned him the attention of Liu Chengxun, who promoted him. This caused tensions with Chen Hongfan, and Liu was subsequently forced to flee to Qingshen. The two would later reconcile, and Chen appointed Liu as a commander in the Yibin area. Yibin, at the confluence of the Jinsha and Min rivers, was known as a major trade port.

Around the time of the anti-Yunnan campaign, Liu's parents died, and Liu was unable to return home for their funerals.

In 1922, Liu Wenhui became a brigade commander at Yibin with his nephew Liu Xiang's help. This move gave him total control over the city. To collect more funds, Liu brought in his brother, Liu Wencai, as an economic official. Liu Wencai's administration was notorious for its corruption but effective in achieving Liu Wenhui's goals, collecting 30,000 silver dollars in its first year through the enforcement of various taxes. Liu Wencai also advised his brother to appoint loyalists as county magistrates in areas under their control, ensuring local revenue flowed directly to his forces. In Yibin, Liu Wenhui promoted modern education in both the military and civilian spheres.

Also in 1922, Liu Xiang, who had become Sichuan governor, was defeated in a war against Xiong Kewu and Deng Xihou. Liu Wenhui moved his troops to Chongqing to support his nephew, but after Liu Xiang's defeat, he negotiated a withdrawal back to Yibin to avoid the loss of his army. Liu Xiang was subsequently forced to resign his position as governor.

From 1922 to 1924, there was constant conflict in Sichuan. According to historian Robert Kapp, the region functioned as a politically isolated ecosystem for much of the early Republican period. Because it was insulated by geography from the rest of China, this allowed a highly fragmented and fluid balance of power to emerge against local warlords. Outside powers, including Wu Peifu of the Zhili Clique and Sun Yat-sen of the Kuomintang, also intervened intermittently in the Sichuan melee to support their chosen side in the larger context of the North-South conflict. Liu Wenhui was generally aligned with Liu Xiang and Liu Chengxun during this period, being promoted to commander of the Ninth Division in February 1923 by Liu Chengxun.

=== Gaining strength ===
Liu Wenhui took advantage of the Sichuanese conflicts to gain power. In 1924, he gave financial support to Liu Xiang and Yang Sen in their campaign to oust Xiong Kewu's forces; in return, the two warlords allowed him to take control of a part of the defeated Xiong's army and territories. In October 1925, after Yang Sen's defeat in a military conflict, Liu again incorporated part of the losing party's armies and territories, expanding his influence to Meishan and Leshan. Chief Executive Duan Qirui also appointed him as the Assistant Military Affairs Commissioner for Sichuan. When his former commander Chen Hongfan was attacked by Yang Sen's forces, Liu offered him no help and even refused an appeal by Leng Yingdong to let Chen serve in his government. Instead, Liu absorbed Chen's remaining forces; Chen subsequently returned to Dayi County in disgrace and reportedly went mad.

During the May Thirtieth Movement, students in Yibin staged a boycott of British goods and clashed with British merchants. Liu Wenhui's military police arrested the student leaders, sparking outrage, but Liu met with the students and made an anti-imperialist speech mentioning his connections to the patriot Jiang Baili. To prove that his prisoners were not being tortured, Liu let demonstrators observe that they were playing basketball in the prison courtyard.

In the wake of the Northern Expedition and the First United Front, Liu began flirting with progressive ideas. Around 1926, Liu appointed Communist Party member Liu Yuan'an as one of his senior advisors. Another Communist, Li Jingxuan, became his secretary-general. Under Liu Yuan'an's influence, Liu Wenhui supposedly expressed interest in inviting the prominent communist Wu Yuzhang to head the Chengdu University and funded progressive newspapers. Liu also asked his communist advisor to send political workers for Liu Wenhui's army. Peng Dixian and Shu Guofan's 1990 biography of Liu, written in the People's Republic by communist-aligned authors, casts these instances as evidence of his "inclinations towards revolution" but noted that these progressive leanings were shallow.

In August 1926, Liu Wenhui and Liu Chengxun jointly issued a circular telegram denouncing Wu Peifu, accusing the Beiyang warlord of bringing chaos to Sichuan. This signaled their alignment with the Nationalist cause. In December 1926, the Northern Expedition captured Wuhan, and Liu sent a delegation under Zhang Zhihe [zh] to seek recognition from the new Nationalist government. He joined the Kuomintang and was appointed the commander of the 24th Army of the National Revolutionary Army.

After Liu's appointment as commander of the 24th Army, he moved to Chengdu, leaving the defense of Yibin to Tan Xiaolou (覃筱楼), a former bandit leader Liu had recruited. Here, he joined Deng Xihou and Tian Songyao, who had already established themselves in the city. All three were classmates from their Baoding days and ruled as a united front in public, but privately schemed to expand their individual power. Liu had seized the Chengdu Arsenal in 1925 after Yang Sen's downfall, but to appease the city's other warlords, he announced plans to convert it into a mechanical repair shop rather than a weapons factory. To oversee this process, he appointed his brother Liu Wencheng, who had previously run a distillery, as its manager. Liu Wencheng would also later be appointed to several managerial positions in industrial enterprises. The Chengdu Arsenal would eventually be converted into a mint, increasing Liu Wenhui's money supply.

Liu's brother Wencheng used his position in Chengdu to purchase houses and land, expanding his family's real estate holdings. He purchased so much property that his rivals nicknamed him "Liu Half-City", (Note: This is read as 刘半城, or Liu Bancheng.) implying he owned half of Chengdu. Liu Wenhui's army continued growing due to money and industrial supplies from his brothers. Over the course of 1926, he attacked and disarmed the forces of Yang Chunfang in January and Lü Chao in April, taking control of Lü's territories in southern Sichuan. To formalize the division of Chengdu, Liu, Deng, and Tian established a joint command in December 1926 with Liu as director.

In December 1926, communist forces under Liu Bocheng launched the Luzhou Uprising in Sichuan as part of the Northern Expedition. Liu Bocheng's forces successfully took control of the city from warlord Lai Xinhui. Control of Luzhou was coveted by several neighboring warlords, who had also begun besieging the city. To prevent his rivals from capturing Luzhou, Liu dispatched his friend Leng Yingdong to surround the city in April 1927. He then negotiated a secret deal with Liu Bocheng, granting safe passage to Liu's men in exchange for control of Luzhou, a deal that the communist commander accepted.

=== Major warlord ===
Liu continued amassing power throughout 1927. In June, he attacked the forces of Liu Chengxun, who had been appointed by the Nationalists as the commander of the Sichuan-Xikang Defence Force. According to Liu's state-sanctioned biography, Liu Chengxun was highly corrupt, collecting taxes in advance and levying a dizzying array of new payments, including a "birthday tax" and a "revolution tax". Liu Wenhui issued a proclamation denouncing Liu Chengxun's oppression and corruption and appealing to other warlords to launch a joint expedition against him; his clique proceeded to collapse without a fight, with many subordinates defecting to Liu Wenhui. By December 1927, he had taken control of the Sichuan-Xikang Defence Force, gaining power over the Chinese-controlled regions of Kham. Liu Chengxun returned to Dayi County, living in obscurity under a state of virtual house arrest by Liu Wenhui's forces. Also in late 1927, Liu Wenhui attacked Lai Xinhui to connect his territories with Liu Xiang's, capturing Yongchuan, Jiangjin, and Hejiang and forcing Lai to flee to Guizhou.

Liu enlisted the communist activist Li Jingxuan to set up a propaganda committee, which played a role in the defeat of Liu Chengxun. After entering Liu Chengxun's territories, Liu Wenhui declared an end to oppressive taxes, and local gentry printed propaganda declaring support for his rule as a "true revolutionary". However, the National Gazette had previously run articles detailing the struggling conditions in Sichuan; exacerbated by heavy war taxes and drought, desperate peasantry were allegedly eating grass, bark, and even resorting to cannibalism. Liu Wenhui admitted himself that anti-government unrest had occurred in Rongxian and Yibin. The National Gazette reported that students from Rongxian had submitted a petition listing the exorbitant taxes imposed on them; many of Liu Wenhui's fees were similar or even identical to those levied by Liu Chengxun, including the 5,000-yuan "revolution tax".

Similar complaints and petitions to Liu Wenhui from local residents were recorded denouncing Liu Wencai's taxation regime in 1925 and around 1927. According to the 1927 letter, Liu Wencai had collaborated with Tan Xiaolou and become director of taxation bureaus. Liu Wencai exacted many inventive forms of payment, including a "flower tax" for prostitutes, fees to pay for wounded soldiers, and several other miscellaneous taxes on such varied articles as hoes, toilets, stamps, and clothing. Liu Wencai had also engaged in speculation, monopolizing the supply of various medicinal herbs to sell them at high prices. After the 24th Army launched an auction of public properties in 1927, Liu Wencai used several different aliases in order to purchase the bulk of the real estate for sale. Slogans targeting Liu Wencai had also appeared in the streets of Yibin. However, Liu Wenhui did not take action against his brother.

In April 1927, Chiang Kai-shek purged the communists in the Shanghai Massacre, causing the collapse of the First United Front and the split within the Nationalists between the Nanjing and Wuhan governments. Despite his past alliances of convenience with progressives, Liu Wenhui joined with every other major Sichuan warlord to issue a joint telegram, declaring the orders of the Wuhan government "invalid." Later that year, he made a secret pact with fellow Baoding officers Tian Songyao and Deng Xihou, wherein Liu would support Deng and Tian in an offensive to take control of Chongqing, and the two would support Liu in his campaign to take over Xikang from Liu Chengxun. The planned offensive against Chongqing did not happen.

By 1928, he had reached a new height of power, controlling lands from Xikang to Chengdu. Liu declared ambitious plans to his subordinates: "First, we must unify Sichuan; then we must seize the Central Plains." (Note: (In Chinese: 统一四川，问鼎中原)) He had begun establishing a political-military school in Chengdu to train the 24th Army for this task. The Sichuanese warlord Yang Sen had attempted a similar campaign by attacking the Wuhan government the prior year, suffering major defeat. Liu Wenhui had benefited from this, seizing many of Yang Sen's territories in the wake of his failed campaign. As part of his broader strategy, Liu had also supported Tang Shengzhi, Feng Yuxiang, and Yan Xishan, but they had been subdued by Chiang's forces for the time being, straining relations with the Nanjing government. Still, this did not stop Chiang from appointing him to high positions.

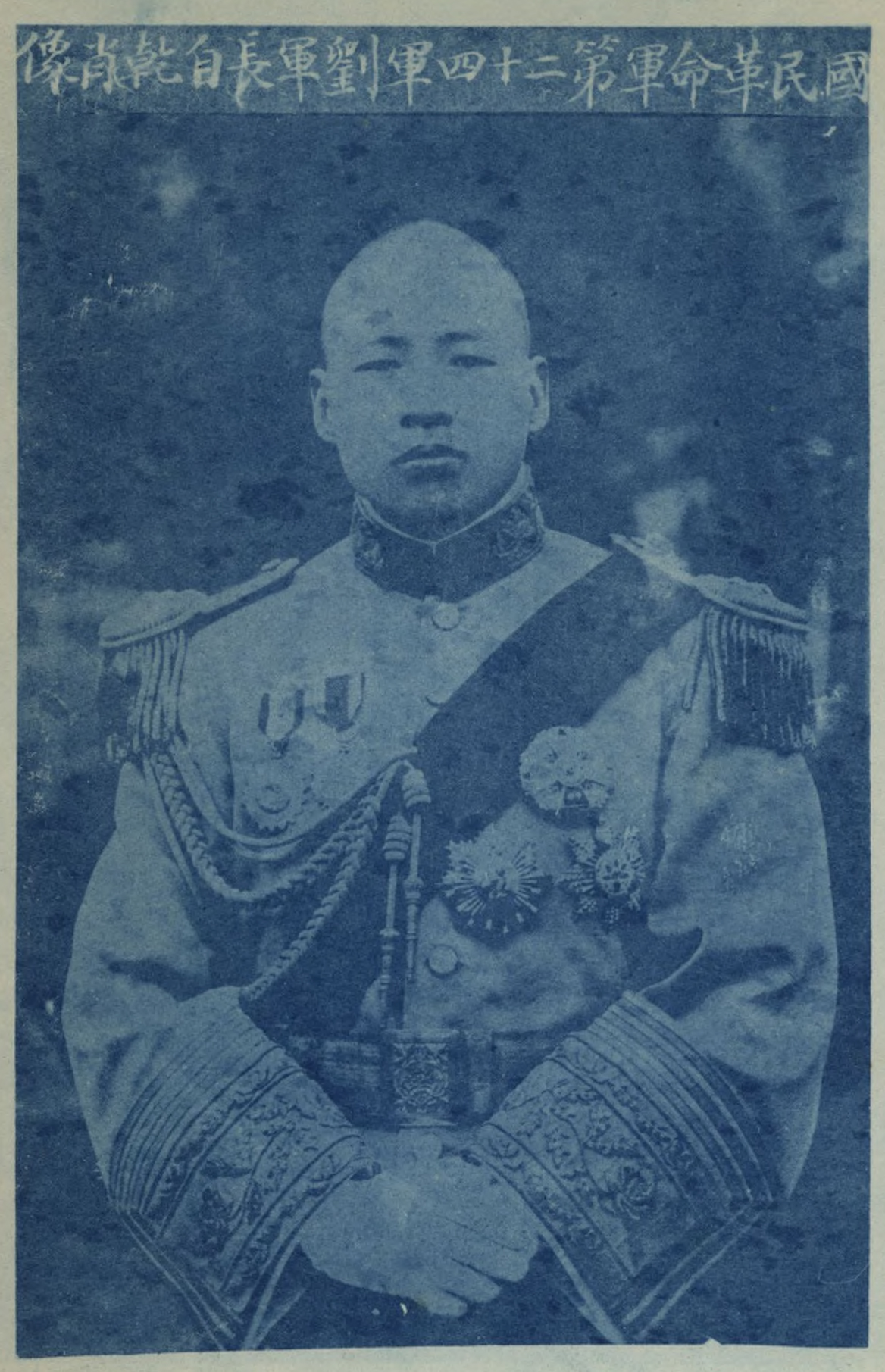
Liu Wenhui in 1928

Liu's nephew Liu Xiang was still the most powerful warlord in Sichuan, ruling Chongqing and the eastern portion of the province, but a new coalition of warlords had formed to oppose him. On 10 December 1928, Yang Sen, Li Jiayu, and Luo Zezhou sent a telegram denouncing Liu Xiang and organized a joint army to overthrow him. Facing defeat, Liu Xiang reached out to Liu Wenhui for aid, promising several territories in exchange for his support. Liu Wenhui did intervene, defeating the warlord coalition; in return, Liu Xiang ceded the Zigong, Neijiang, and Longchang areas to him. Having taken refuge with the Guangxi clique, Yang Sen reportedly vowed revenge against Liu Wenhui for his defeat.

== Rule in Sichuan (1929–1933) ==
In October 1928, Chiang Kai-shek appointed Liu Wenhui as Chairman of the Sichuan Provincial Government. Liu's inauguration occurred on 12 March 1929. He declared that he would focus on relieving the people's suffering and advancing their welfare.

=== Rule in Xikang prior to 1933 ===
Liu Wenhui maintained a tense relationship with the Nanjing government. In 1928, when the central government announced the creation of Suiyuan and Chahar provinces, it also announced plans for a new Xikang province. However, Liu protested this move and claimed that the resources of the proposed Xikang would be insufficient, because more than half of the counties were under Tibetan occupation. He attempted to lobby Nanjing for control of more eight counties in neighboring Sichuan, Yunnan, and Qinghai, and also asked for more funds to develop Xikang and defeat Tibet; both requests were ignored by the central government.

Around this time, an attempt by Nanjing to create Xikang Province on its own terms under the auspices of Kesang Tsering (唐柯三) was thwarted by Liu, who instead set up his own administrative committee in parallel with the central government's one. The Chinese authorities finally gave up after Liu started executing members of the government's committee. According to Leibold, Chiang Kai-shek backed down from asserting control over Xikang because of the tenuous situation of the Kuomintang's rule over China at the time.

While in Xikang, he took a vigorous role in spearheading the development of the capital Kangding in particular, establishing several schools and agricultural experimental stations, as well as constructing a road from Kangding to Rongxian in Sichuan. As a sign of the expanding commercial ties between the two regions (and Han and Tibetan peoples in particular), a special exhibition was held in Chengdu, so that Sichuanese may see and come into contact with Xikang products. In order to levy taxes from the region, Liu also established a Finance Ministry. Historians and analysts have debated over the effectiveness of these measures. Yang Zhonghua, writing in 1941, praised them as a relatively proactive policy; however, it has been argued by Xie Benzao that Liu's plans, though ambitious on paper, were limited by the realities of war and mostly for the purpose of resource extraction. Another road-building project of Liu Wenhui, constructed in the late 1920s from Yazhou to Chengdu, was known by locals mainly for the ruthlessness of its methods. Despite these projects, Xikang was mostly seen as a rear location distant from the conflicts in Sichuan.

Liu encouraged students from Sichuan to take part in "border construction" in Xikang. In September 1929, he set up a newsletter, Bianzheng (邊政), dedicated to frontier administration. The issues of the Bianzheng promoted Sun Yat-sen's Three Principles and advertised Xikang as an attractive region for Chinese settlement, teeming with resources but nonetheless coveted by British imperialists. Propaganda plays published in the newsletter, which can be seen as the official policy of Liu Wenhui's government, exhorted youths to settle and develop the Xikang frontier, despite hardships, and thwart the imperialist plans of Tibet and Britain. Liu's projects in Xikang have been characterized by historians Joe Lawson and James Leibold as a form of "warlord colonialism", aimed at extracting resources and establishing Chinese control over a non-Han territory, but without the backing of a strong central state. Lawson asserts Xikang to be "in some respects, a Sichuanese colonial project".

=== War with Tibet ===
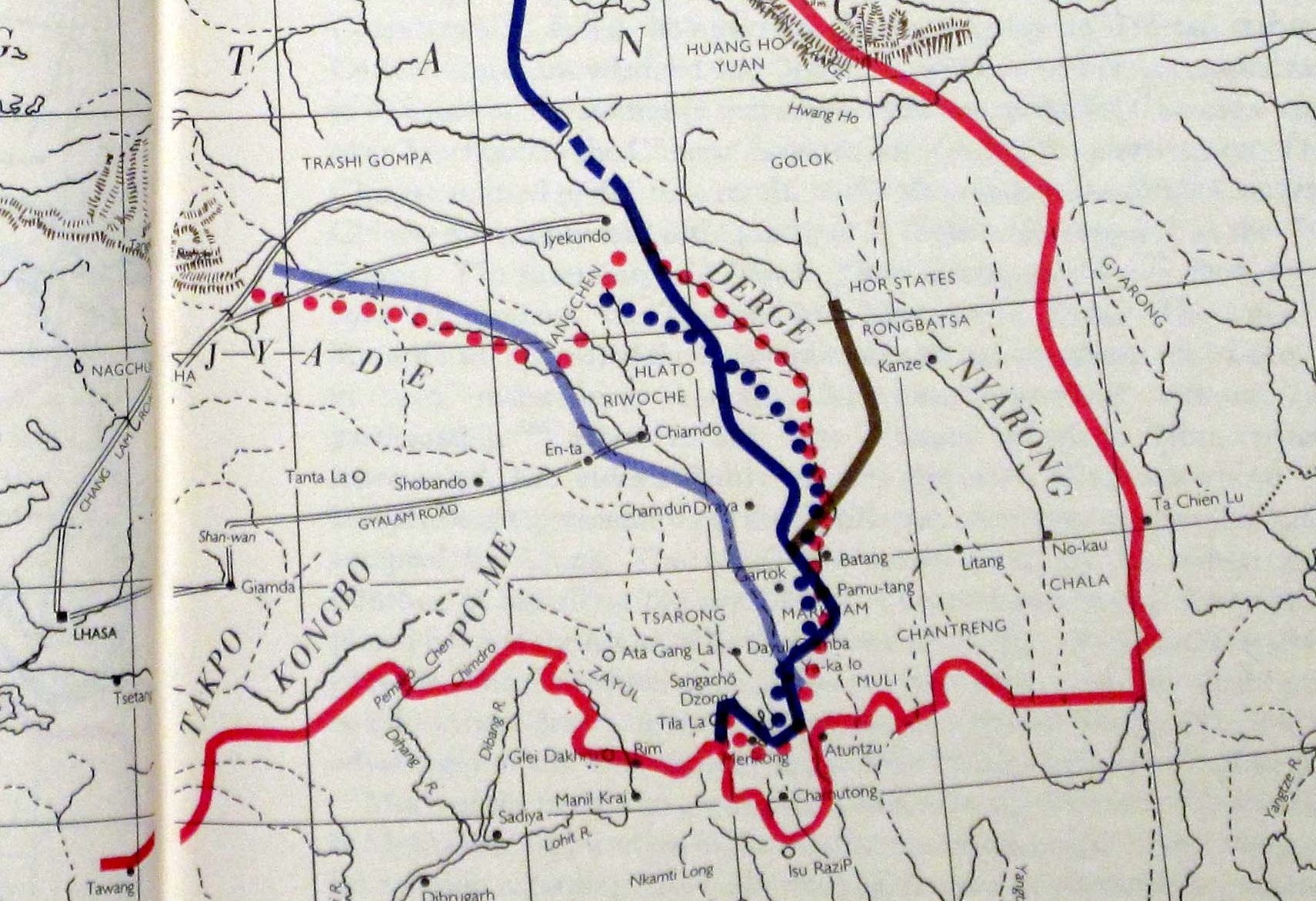
The disputed borders in Kham between Tibet and China were the main cause of the war.

Liu inherited a long-running border dispute with Tibet over several areas in Xikang, including the tusi of Beri (Pehru). Around June 1930, the chieftain of Beri seized a monastery belonging to Tibetan monks, but this was soon retaken. In response, Liu Wenhui came to the chieftain's aid and took control of the area. However, this action would prompt a general Tibetan offensive in Kham. In June 1930, the Tibetan army invaded Xikang. With the province locked in internal struggles, no reinforcements were sent to support the Sichuan troops stationed in Xikang. As a result, the Tibetan army, with training and arms provided by Britain, captured Garze and Xinlong without encountering much resistance. The Tibetans had managed to push the frontline to within 160 kilometers of Kangding when the 13th Dalai Lama called on the Nanjing government to mediate the conflict. In April 1931, the central government once again dispatched Kesang Tsering to Garze for negotiations.

The draft agreement of 7 November 1931—concluded without the authorization of Liu Wenhui—recognized Tibet as the victor and required Liu to pay an indemnity of twenty thousand yuan, as well as establish a demilitarized zone in western Xikang. This agreement proved highly controversial across China, not least because it came on the heels of Japan's occupation of Manchuria. Public pressure from Xikang and the regional government's opposition forced Nanjing to relent in February and relinquish authority to Liu Wenhui, who was set on continuing the war.

Tibet subsequently expanded the war, attempting to capture parts of southern Qinghai province. In March 1932 their force invaded Qinghai, but was defeated. Liu, in cooperation with the Ma clique army of Ma Bufang, sent out a brigade under Yu Songling (余松琳) to attack the Tibetan troops in Garze and Xinlong, eventually re-occupying them and all territories east of the Jinsha River. By then, there were around 8,000 troops from Liu's 24th Army in Kham. The Dalai Lama once again appealed to Nanjing, but Liu ignored the central government's calls for peace and began preparations for an attack on Chamdo over the summer of 1932. This planned offensive did not occur because a ceasefire was called in October. The Kamtok (Guangtou) Agreement set the border between the two parties on the Jinsha river.

A 1933 analysis of the situation by Deng Shiyi, one of Liu's subordinates, claimed that the war with Tibet was ended only because continuing the offensive could strain relations with Great Britain; however historians Kim Hee-shin and Leibold generally believe that it is far likelier the conflict ended because Liu was facing a far more pressing priority: the war in Sichuan.

=== Policies in Sichuan ===
Liu's governance of Sichuan was challenged by various natural disasters, exacerbated by war. The National Gazette reported the existence of famine in Shunqing and Jintang, as well as other areas of the province. The measures Liu took to address these crises are not known.

Liu Wenhui continued his emphasis on promoting education, founding the Jianguo Middle School in Chengdu and serving as its chairman. The school reportedly had high academic standards and included stringent political training.

Geographically, the wealthiest and most productive areas in central Sichuan were under Liu Wenhui's sway. This included Chengdu, but also the important salt production centers of Zilujing-Gongjing and the major river port of Yibin, as well as other agricultural and commercial facilities across the Chengdu Plain. Control of the lucrative Yunnan-Sichuan of opium, salt, and weapons in Yibin in particular was dominated by his older brother Liu Wencai, who was a key part of Liu's government. Liu funded some of his garrisons with the salt tax of Leshan, earning around 800 taels per month. These resources helped sustain Liu's armies and secure his power base.

=== Relations with Sichuan warlords and the central government ===
Part of Liu Wenhui's success stemmed from his connections with other Sichuan warlords who were also graduates of Baoding, (Note: Note that members of the "Baoding Clique" did not necessarily go to Baoding Military Academy. However, they must have been part of the Sichuan Army Elementary Academy or one of the Baoding Academy's other feeder schools.) including Deng Xihou and Tian Songyao, who stood in contrast with Liu Xiang and Yang Sen, who went to the Sichuan Army Accelerated Training School. Although Liu Wenhui was younger than his competitors, he was able to rise to power faster. By 1932, Liu controlled 68 out of 147 counties (around 46%) (Note: To compare, Kim also notes Liu Xiang had control of 28 counties, of 19% of Sichuan's 147 counties.) of the province, a position he had built through familial and professional relationships with his nephew Liu Xiang and his colleagues from the "Baoding clique". However, while clique and blood ties are popular with scholars as a means of explaining the different alliances in warlord-era Sichuan, Kim Hee-shin notes that there are undoubtedly more factors that determined the power relations and subsuquent conflicts between different polities.

Liu's greatest political fear was that the smaller Sichuan warlords would join a coalition against him, an eventuality that occurred during the Two-Liu War.

A sign of the close connection between the Baoding graduates was the fact that from 1925 to 1932, the Sichuanese capital of Chengdu was jointly governed by a triumvirate consisting of Liu Wenhui, Deng Xihou, and Tian Songyao. To assist him in this task, Liu Wenhui appointed a subordinate commander, Xiang Chuanyi to administer Chengdu on his behalf and maintain relations with the other warlords.

Liu took an anti-Chiang stance in the Central Plains War, declaring his support for the coalition of Feng Yuxiang, Yan Xishan, and Wang Jingwei in 1930. This stood in contrast to Liu Xiang's more pro-Chiang attitude. Official Chinese sources also claim that Liu supported anti-Nanjing forces such as Hu Ruoyu in Yunnan and Wang Jialie in Guizhou. Nevertheless, this stance was a tepid one and tempered further by pragmatic opportunism; like the rest of his colleagues, Liu refrained from committing his army to the war when a representative of Feng Yuxiang arrived in Sichuan in 1929 to convince the province's warlords to side with the coalition. Once the anti-Chiang side began suffering military defeats, Liu professed his loyalty to the national government in 1931.

=== Two-Liu War and ouster from Sichuan ===
==== Road to war ====
Liu Wenhui's 1990 biography asserts that conflict between the two Lius was almost inevitable. Due to the consolidation of power in Sichuan that had occurred over the 1920s, Liu Wenhui and Liu Xiang had become the two most powerful warlords in the province. Liu Wenhui's assumption of the governorship in 1929 had turned many smaller warlords against him. By controlling the lower reaches of the Yangtze and the Qutang Gorge, Liu Xiang held the geographic advantage over his uncle, having priority in purchasing weapons from abroad (which entered Sichuan through the Yangtze), and had built a navy of three gunboats by fitting merchant ships with iron hulls. This also meant that Liu Xiang could block weapons from reaching Liu Wenhui's upstream domains, an ability that he would use to his advantage.

Liu Xiang was also reportedly under the sway of his Taoist mystic advisor, Liu Congyun, who had told him that he was destined to unite the province under his rule. Yet another supposed factor contributing to conflict was the interference of Chiang Kai-shek, who did not want either warlord to become too powerful.

Most sources agree that Liu Wenhui's abortive attempt to acquire military aviation assets in 1931 was the spark that led him to conflict with his nephew. Official Chinese sources state that a shipment ordered by Liu of foreign aircraft components worth 2 million yuan was seized by Liu Xiang at the port of Wanxian in Chongqing, leading to heightened tensions between the two Lius. Liu Wenhui travelled to Chongqing to negotiate with Liu Xiang, but Liu Xiang would not hand over the confiscated shipment. This was because Liu Xiang had a policy of not allowing any other Sichuanese warlord to gain aircraft (he himself had already acquired a rudimentary air force consisting of several Potez 25 and Breguet 14 bombers). Western sources also agree that Liu Wenhui tried obtaining aircraft, although according to them the aircraft were either seized in Hankou by the central government or crashed en route to Chengdu.

The Chinese sources go further by asserting that in May 1931, Liu Wenhui attempted to bribe Liu Xiang's subordinates, including Fan Shaozhen, to join him, but they reported this matter to Liu Xiang, causing Liu to waste 450,000 yuan. An angered Liu supposedly then cut off Liu Xiang's grain supply, forcing the Chongqing warlord to urgently purchase grain from Hunan to prevent hunger.

Whatever the matter, it is clear that Liu Wenhui's once-cooperative relationship with his nephew, General Liu Xiang, had soured and turned into a rivalry. On 19 October 1932, Liu Xiang's general, Tang Shizun, and ninety-four other Sichuanese warlords issued a circular telegram to denounce Liu Wenhui. The telegram asserted that Liu was power-hungry, unscrupulous, corrupt, and nepotistic, with no real plans for governing Sichuan and resorting to underhanded tactics such as bribery, backstabbing, and banditry to gain and maintain power.

On the eve of war in 1932, Liu Wenhui's armies were estimated at around 120,000 men, slightly outnumbering Liu Xiang's 100,000. Deng and Tian's forces were estimated to be forty and sixty thousand, respectively.

==== Initial campaigns (October–December 1932) ====
Liu Wenhui was taken off-guard by the sudden war; in contrast, Liu Xiang had developed a strategy of cutting his uncle's supply lines. Liu Xiang's forces would first attack Luzhou in a combined arms offensive featuring his army, navy, and aviation, capturing the city. After the loss of Luzhou, an uprising broke out in Yibin against the rule of Liu Wenhui and his extractive tax collector and brother Liu Wencai. Liu Wencai took advantage of the chaos gripping the city to loot around 1.4 million silver dollars, even taking artifacts from the Luzhou Fuzhou Hall. Liu Wencai then escaped, disguised as a foreigner, ending his rule of Yibin. Thus, already caught off-balance, Liu Wenhui lost two of his most important cities at the very start of the war. Liu Xiang's army then began advancing towards Leshan.

In November, Liu Wenhui would end up antagonizing the other Baoding warlords by attacking Tian Songyao's forces in Chengdu. The ensuing urban warfare caused over 20,000 casualties and 27,000 refugees, leading to both warlords losing much of their popular support. Deng Xihou, the third Baoding warlord, attempted to mediate the conflict, but with no success. Although Tian Songyao had been defeated by December and even offered to retire, his subordinates refused to let him step down. In the end, a ceasefire was reached and Tian remained in Chengdu, causing no gain for Liu Wenhui, who had departed for Meishan to set up his headquarters. Around late November to early December, Liu Xiang's forces made plans to assault Renshou and Jianyang, both on the approaches to Chengdu. Several sources cite December as the end date of the Two-Liu War; however, fighting continued long into 1933.

==== Rongxian-Weiyuan campaign (late 1932–early 1933) ====
From his Meishan headquarters, Liu concentrated his forces in Rongxian and Weiyuan. Despite the ceasefire, he still did not trust Deng and Tian, fearing their betrayal if he were to fight Liu Xiang, trapping him in a pincer maneuver. To solve this strategic impasse, Liu proposed a strategic withdrawal: the bulk of his army was to retreat from northern Sichuan into Shaanxi and Gansu, only to attack Deng and Tian from the north. However, due to a combination of poor winter weather and his officers' unwillingness to attack their Baoding classmates, he was forced to shelve the plan.

The campaign has been described as unprecedentedly fierce. Over 5,000 deaths were reported at the twin battles of Jiangjiachang and Laojuntai. Seizing on his momentum, Liu Xiang then convened a conference at Neijiang calling for the unification of Sichuan and the surrender of Liu Wenhui. Liu Wenhui's forces were ultimately defeated when Deng Xihou ordered Tian Songyao to attack them from the rear.

==== Campaign on the Pihe River (May–July 1933) ====
Liu deeply resented what he saw as Deng Xihou's betrayal, causing him to lose much territory in the Sichuan Basin. Not only did Deng order Tian to attack Liu's rear, but he had also taken over Chengdu in Liu's absence, blocking his return to the city. Liu had entrusted Deng with the city, but he had allowed Tian Songyao and his subordinates to reenter, including Wang Mingzhang who had become the Chengdu garrison commander. Both sides attempted negotiations while preparing their forces; Deng first attempted to appease Liu Wenhui, but Liu had by then resolved to crush him. Liu first attempted to lure Deng into a deadly banquet, but Deng caught wind of these plans and even taunted Liu about them.

The battle began in May 1933 when Liu attacked along the Pihe River. Seeking support, Deng entered into talks with Liu Xiang's advisor Liu Congyun. By strategically converting to Liu Congyun's Taoist sect, Deng managed to acquire ammunition for his regiments and 100,000 silver dollars. Liu's officers also refused to fight against their former Baoding classmates, with some demanding more pay or even entering into negotiations with Deng's commanders. In June, heavy fighting was reported around Guanxian. By July, Liu Xiang had arrived in Neijiang to command a new offensive against Liu Wenhui. When Liu Wenhui convened a strategy meeting with his subordinates, several division commanders openly questioned his authority and leadership. This supposedly caused Liu Wenhui to break down, tearily accepting a retreat to the Min River line from Guanxian to Leshan.

On 8 July 1933, Liu Wenhui offered his resignation as governor of Sichuan, although the central government did not accept this until December 1934 when he was officially reappointed.

==== Campaign on the Min River and final retreat to Xikang (July–October 1933) ====
Liu's defensive line on the west bank of the Min River did not last long, and Liu Xiang's forces crossed it at several points. Morale within the 24th Army collapsed, and desertion was rampant. Liu finally decided to retreat to Mingshan, which guarded the entrance to Ya'an. It was in Ya'an that Liu hoped to reorganize his forces, but he was pursued even here, narrowly escaping with his life after artillery shelled his headquarters. Liu retreated even further into Xikang proper, entering the Ningyuan region. Because Xikang was a desolate country, with few hopes of earning provisions or pay, he voluntarily let many of his officers and soldiers leave the army. Liu later said the loss of most of his army was the "greatest grievance" of his life.

It was at this point where Liu Wenhui telegraphed an apology to his nephew and declared his support for Sichuanese unification. He had also gotten his eldest brother to appeal on his behalf. Liu Xiang also relented, recognizing that fully eliminating Liu Wenhui's forces could leave an opening for Deng Xihou and others in Sichuan to gain power. Judging that his uncle was no longer a threat, Liu Xiang ordered his commander Li Hongkun to retreat from Ya'an on 8 October, clearing the way for Liu Wenhui to return to the town on 24 October and ending the Two-Liu War. In the aftermath of the war, Liu Wenhui was left with his remaining possessions in Xikang, having lost the entire Sichuan basin to Liu Xiang.

Liu would later describe the years 1924–1932 as his "golden age" within Sichuan.

== Ruler of Xikang (1933–1949) ==
After the disastrous Two-Liu War, Liu Wenhui retreated into Xikang, basing himself in the town of Ya'an. He focused his energies on ruling the region, which he aimed to establish as an official province of China. Kim Hee-shin believes that facing the need to secure his rule in Xikang, Liu began taking an interest in the province's affairs.

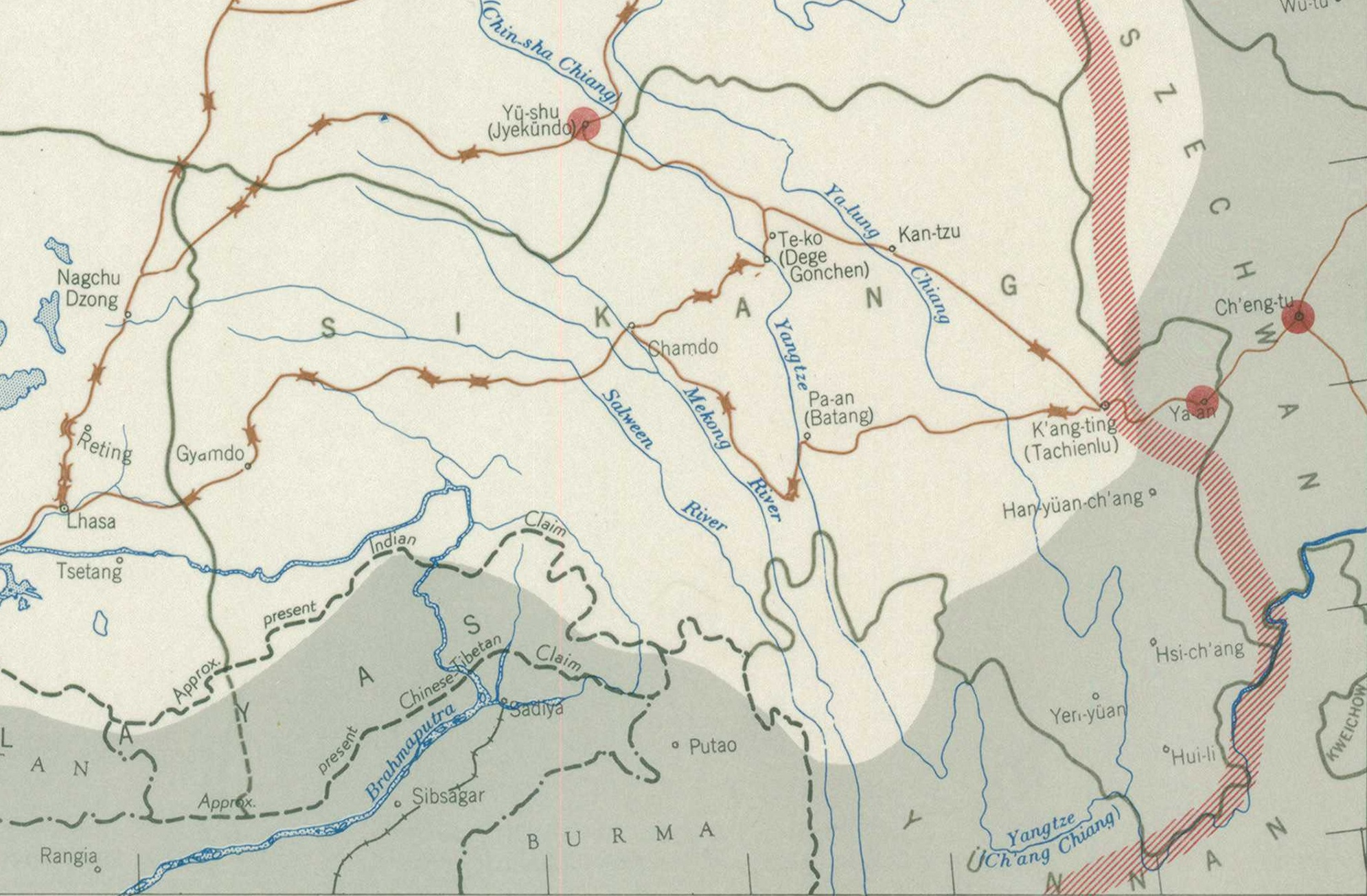
Map of Xikang Province (1950). During Liu's time as Governor, the provincial government's effective control was limited to areas east of the Yangtze River (center).

=== Political organization: transition to a Chinese province ===
Liu Wenhui entered the Xikang area with around ten to twenty thousand troops of the 24th Army at his disposal, equipped with automatic weapons, mortars, and artillery. The size and strength of Liu's remaining forces, even in this diminished state, gave him much authority in dealing with local elites and in pacifying the province. To strengthen control over the local tusi of Kham, Liu ordered from 1932 onwards that all local tribal soldiers be integrated directly into the 24th Army, a measure that reportedly maintained peace in the region.

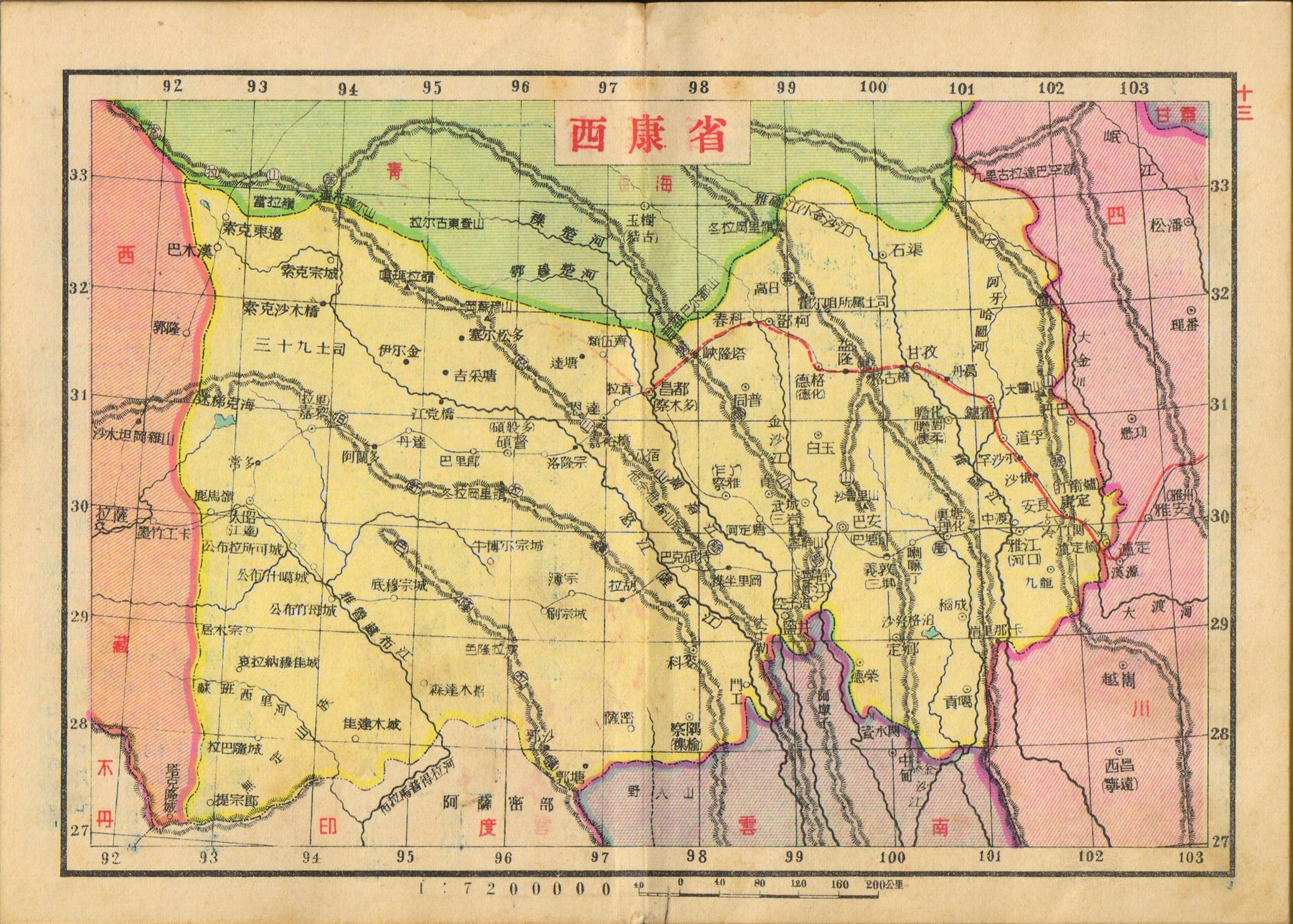
Map of Xikang region in 1936, after the Nationalist reorganization that removed Ya'an and Xichang. This state of affairs continued until 1939.

After his retreat, Liu established the "Ning-Ya-Kang Administrative Committee" in order to govern the areas still under his control. The Nationalist government would also follow suit in December 1934, creating a provincial establishment committee. Liu Wenhui was appointed by Nanjing as chairman of this committee: simultaneously, Liu Xiang was also named as the governor of Sichuan. It was officially formed in Ya'an in July 1935, and moved to Kangding in September 1936.

Xikang was a poor region, isolated and rugged, and a reorganization by the Nationalists in 1936 would strip Liu of his rule over Ya'an and Xichang, which were turned over to Sichuan. The remaining lands were in such an impoverished state, with a population of barely 300,000 and a tax revenue of about 500,000 yuan, that Liu began to have trouble even securing food for the 24th Army. A desperate Liu Wenhui dispatched a mission to Nanjing to ask for his old territories back and for the central government to subsidize his budget; although Wang Jingwei was sympathetic to this idea, Chiang refused to grant him a bailout. Liu Xiang, the old rival of Liu Wenhui, likewise refused to return the regions he had just acquired, which stalled the plans to create an independent Xikang province.

Respite for Liu would come in the form of the full-scale Japanese invasion of China, which forced the central government to move to Sichuan. More importantly, Liu Xiang would die from illness in 1938, clearing Sichuanese opposition to the Xikang project. In the ensuing power struggle for control over the province, General Wang Zuanxu made a deal with Liu that he would return the Ya'an and Xichang regions to Xikang as well as subsidize the Xikang government with 360,000 yuan per year in exchange for Liu's support. This deal went through, and the central government even agreed to fund a highway from Sichuan to Xikang. On 28 November, 1938, the Executive Yuan ratified the establishment of Xikang Province, which was officially inaugurated on 1 January, 1939. Liu Wenhui became the governor of Xikang. In exchange, Wang Zuanxu was able to become the acting chairman of Sichuan Province, although he failed to secure control and was later usurped by Chiang Kai-shek himself.

Liu Wenhui's provincial government was highly nepotistic, made up mostly of personal connections, secretaries, and subordinate officers. Only one politician in the new government, Ye Xiufeng, was a Chiang loyalist: he was subsequently outmaneuvered by Liu and dismissed within two years. Although the Tibetan population were hopeful that the establishment of the province would entail increased representation, Liu only appointed one Tibetan, a monk, to the governing board. This was justified by the national government as a prioritization of national stability over minority rights, ensuring that the Xikang government remained Han-centric and Han-dominant. In addition, the wartime situation meant that by cooperating with the central government, Liu Wenhui would be able to maintain his rule over Xikang.

In September 1939, the Nationalist government promulgated the New County System (县各级组织纲要) to promote local self-government and popular political participation. Liu implemented this system in Xikang in order to increase the province's self-reliance and to curb the influence of the tusi.

Liu identified the training of an administrative cadre as one of the key priorities in building Xikang. To this end, training institutes were established at Kangding (1938) and Hanyuan (1939), training around 2,000 officials. Liu's rhetoric at the time was anti-corruption, stating that only through thoroughly cleansing the officialdom would the counties west of the Jinsha River (then under Tibetan rule) be recovered for Xikang. In June 1941, he established the Xikang Provincial Training Corps, which ran until December 1946 and trained around 4,500 students in all. Liu personally interviewed each applicant and graded their exam papers, ensuring that all new graduates would be loyal to him. This administrative cadre, personally loyal to Liu, was one of the factors that helped him resist central government encroachment.

=== Social policies: "Three Transformations" ===
Perhaps inspired by the Three Principles of the People, Liu Wenhui adopted a frontier policy known as the "Three Transformations" (san hua zhengce, 三化政策). Although described by Liu as a policy, it was closer to a loose model of governance. These three transformations included transformation through virtuous rule (de hua; 德化), assimilation (tong hua; 同化), and progress (jin hua; 進化). For Liu, virtuous rule was to win the hearts and minds of the non-Han populace, and progress would establish an interventionist, "fluid" government that avoided "static" stagnation under laissez-faire rule. However, Liu refrained from elucidating on the exact nature such progress would take.

Liu also reportedly adopted different management styles for areas of Xikang depending on the ethnic group that inhabited them. For Tibetan areas, he advocated "steady progress" (稳进); for Han areas, "gradual progress" (逐进). Finally, for Yi areas, he called for "rapid progress" (猛进). These were called the "Three Advances" (三进主义).

On the matter of ethnic policy, Liu's government was highly selective. Although his administration was relatively tolerant of Tibetans, even patronizing Tibetan Buddhism and establishing schools for Tibetan students, it was highly discriminatory against the Yi people, calling for the complete erasure of Yi identity. For many Han settlers in Xikang, the Yi were a "scourge", associated with violence and slave-raiding; the Yi, in turn, spoke of a "Han scourge". On this matter, Liu Wenhui expressed strong assimilationist sentiment, stating: "Only when the Yi people have become Han people will the Yi problem be completely solved."

The fact that the two transformations of assimilation and virtuous rule were in tension was noted even by contemporaries, and there was vigorous debate within Liu's government over whether benevolent paternalism or rule of force was the best way to "civilize" the Yi people. Liu himself was inconsistent on the matter of assimilation, saying different things to different audiences and holding what the historian Joe Lawson believes may have been "genuinely mixed feelings." Lawson also concluded that the Three Transformations were not a new model, as they had drawn on ancient Confucian precepts and were influenced by Liu's reading of Ming-era chivalric stories. To him, Liu's invention and promotion of this policy was mainly due to his desire "to be seen as an innovator in the field of frontier governance."

Nevertheless, it is clear that Liu's policy towards Tibetan issues leaned towards the former. Part of the stated purpose of the Wuming (五明) Buddhist colleges, which Liu established in areas around Xikang, was to "link up the Tibetan and Han culture" and to "integrate politics, religion, and education in Kham". Liu also encouraged intermarriage between Han and Tibetans, believing that this would most effectively reduce the barriers between the two ethnic groups.

Liu promoted education as a way to improve Xikang's situation and to facilitate assimilation. According to one of Liu's generals, education would make it so that “within ten to twenty years, the people will have forgotten even the names of the minority groups.” (Note: However, Heather Stoddard, writing in a piece about Tibetan resistance, attributed the quote to Liu himself, using it to attack Sinicization in general and the Cultural Revolution in particular. Lawson considers this to have been a misattribution on her part.) He established several schools for Tibetans in the borderlands in order to facilitate "Han-Tibetan language exchange".

The language of instruction within schools was a matter of much debate within the provincial government, but by 1942, Liu's administration began prioritizing bilingual education in order to encourage Tibetans to learn Chinese. This came along with a slate of other measures aimed at creating a mobile educational system using geshe or khenpo monks to disseminate nationalist values to isolated and nomadic borderland communities. Liu recognized that the monks and lamas held more power in many areas of Xikang than the government; thus, the government would have to co-opt them. As part of this effort, anti-Japanese war propaganda and bilingual newspapers were posted on the walls of temples.

Liu Wenhui criticized the Sinicization policies of past Xikang ruler Zhao Erfeng for being "extremist", saying that Zhao "emphasized force and acted too hastily"; however, this must be placed in light of his own contradictory stances.

==== Buddhism ====
Liu was a major patron of Tibetan Buddhism, allocating funds to repair temples, distribute alms, and even to pay stipends to monks studying in Lhasa and Kangding. Around 1939, he established the Xikang Buddhist Affairs Committee to settle disputes between monks and laypeople.

According to Ren Naiqiang, a contemporary who had worked under Liu's government, it was only through the promotion of Buddhism that Liu was able to stabilize his rule after the retreat to Xikang. Upon arriving in Kangding, Liu reportedly invited several famous lamas to gather at his residence to teach him scriptures and dharma. Liu would turn prayer wheels and chant mantras. After these sessions, the lamas spread the word that Liu was in fact the reincarnation of the protector Vajrapani, which greatly enhanced his reputation amongst the people of Kham.

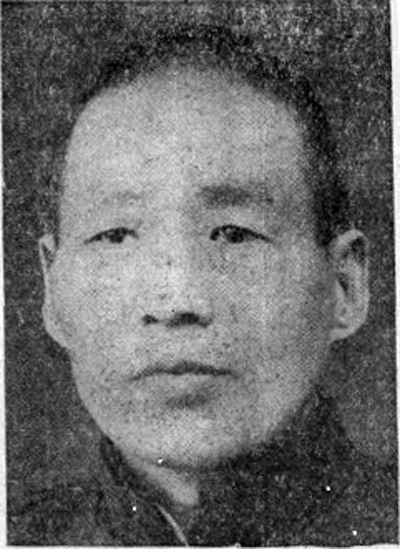
Liu Wenhui around 1948

=== Economic policies ===
On taking control of the Xikang region, Liu Wenhui noted the poverty of the area, stating of the native population: "They lack clothes to cover their bodies and food to fill their bellies. The people suffer through life without any joy in living." Liu made efforts to reduce the tax burden on the people, slashing levies by 30% to 50% for many counties in Xikang.

However, the problem of funding Liu's army was still a major one, as Liu had been forced out of his productive Sichuan basin territories. In 1934, the government mainly still relied on taxes, but from 1935 onwards Liu's administration had a monthly stipend from the central government worth 15,000 yuan per month. He had also managed to increase the amount of grain tax collected from 1,509 Sichuanese dan in 1932 to 13,352 dan in 1939. (Note: According to the 1930 Weights and Measures Act of the Republic of China, one liang is equivalent to 31.25 g, and one dan is equivalent to 50 kg.)

==== Wula debate ====
Another major economic problem Liu faced was the existence of the wula (corvée) system, or the forced transport labor system of the Tibetan highlands. Wula applied to services from both people and pack animals. Such compulsory work meant that many overburdened peasants either rebelled or fled the region, reducing tax revenues and hindering transportation. The scale of forced labor also resulted in serfs having no time to tend to agricultural duties. The wula system was maintained and even expanded throughout the Republican era, with authorities utilizing it as a means to collect taxes and move soldiers through the interior of the province. In addition, many Han officials and even tusi chieftains used the system for private profit and failed to pay the peasants for their labor, placing heavy burdens on local communities.

Liu's first attempts to address the wula problem came in 1932 during the war with Tibet when he created the "State Wula Agency" that would purchase pack animals from local pastures. This scheme failed, although the reasons are unclear. Lawson provides several causes causes, including of a cattle disease that killed many animals and the strain of the conflict and redeployment from Tibet to Sichuan (to fight the Two-Liu War) that also caused more casualties amongst the purchased animals. The agency also suffered from major embezzlement, and it folded in 1932 after spending more than 20,000 Tibetan yuan.

Following this failure, a larger-scale version of the State Wula Agency was attempted in 1938 with the creation of the state-owned Xikang Animal Transport Company. This too had dismal results, as according to Liu (writing in a 1940 article), animals died en masse because Han colonists did not know how to take care of them and Kham herders had no incentive to do so. Once again, corruption was an issue, and the company was dissolved within a year after spending over 100,000 yuan. Despite this level of spending, it also suffered from a lack of veterinary medicine.

A major debate over the wula system began after the collapse of both initiatives. One faction, led by Ren Zhuo, continued to call for abolishing the system to make way for state enterprise, Liu Wenhui, however, argued that the system would have to be kept and regulated due to the prior failures, and because it was the only major means of transportation in Kham. Another faction including Jiang Junzhang and the Frontier Administration Planning Commission argued for giving indigenous herders and other local voices more ownership and roles in company activities.

There was a major ethnic dimension within this debate, because the anti-wula faction targeted the Kham herdsmen for their "obstinate" behavior and their control over the transport system. Meanwhile, the regulatory approach favored by Liu would help maintain points of contact between Han and indigenous people, and, according to Wang Zhuo, would make them "more accustomed to Hanization." Liu did not personally reiterate those statements, although this was an argument presented by his faction and criticized by their opponents.

In the end, Liu's side prevailed, and wula would not be fully abolished until the establishment of communist rule decades later. Liu did abolish several minor corvée duties, including the provision of firewood, fodder, tea, and miscellaneous services such as sweeping, but these were distinct from the transport corvée.

Liu defended the wula system's continued existence in a 1939 conference: "if the people think the corvée is an oppressive policy, then they are wrong." Liu's 1990 biography mentions this as emblematic of the limits of warlord-driven reform compared to the wula's complete abolition under Mao in 1959.

==== Opium ====
Liu reportedly called opium cultivation the "lifeline" of the 24th Army and derived much of his income from the drug, which was traded and later cultivated on a massive scale. The opium business became extremely profitable after 1936 when the central government started aggressively suppressing production within the Sichuan basin, making opium grown by the Yi in the Xikang highlands extremely profitable. Lawson went as far as to conclude that the Kuomintang's anti-opium campaign was arguably "another form of assistance that the national government granted Liu Wenhui". A similar period of suppression in the lowlands coinciding with an opium boom in the highlands was also documented from 1906 to 1911 under the Qing dynasty. Cultivation of opium in Kham began after 1936, spreading to Liu's territories around the early 1940s.

Liu Wenhui profited greatly from this illegal trade, and was able to fund his military and economic projects through opium sales. In 1940, he was alleged to have struck a deal with the Yunnanese governor Long Yun that let tariffed opium from Yunnan pass through Xikang en route to Sichuan. Later, this trade would decline as Xikang became a major opium producer in its own right. Historians including Lawson have so far been unable to place an exact amount on the income that Xikang gained from opium; only that it was probably at least as much as the subsidy Xikang received from the central government.

In 1942, the Nationalists conducted a major fiscal reorganization by abolishing provincial budgets and centralizing financial control, a move that ironically led to many local administrations relying even less on the central government because they had lost funding. These local administrations were forced to turn to other measures to support themselves. Liu Wenhui, who had already been involved in the opium trade prior to 1942, now faced the loss of his stipend from both the central government and the Sichuanese provincial government. Liu's budgetary situation had already been precarious: in 1939, Xikang's expenditures were around 5.4 million yuan, but non-opium income only amounted to 1.4 million yuan.

Liu began growing opium on a systematic scale around the early 1940s. He instituted taxes on opium, taxes for not growing opium (the "laziness tax"), taxes on the import, export, and sale of opium, and "red light" taxes on opium dens. After 1942, each county in Xikang was assigned an annual tax quota of at least 100 dan (160,000 liang), with total revenues estimated at at least 3–4,000 dan. The price per liang of opium was one to two silver dollars in Xikang and three to four dollars in the Sichuan basin, not counting shortages.

During the communist era, when opium consumption was strictly prohibited, Liu admitted that his strategy was one of "drinking poison to quench thirst." However, he blamed Chiang Kai-shek for forcing him into a situation where he had no other choice but to cultivate, trade, and tax opium.

==== Agriculture and land ====
Liu Wenhui's agricultural policy put much emphasis on wage laborers working under state-owned enterprises, a marked departure from Zhao Erfeng's more explicitly colonialist model of settlers working on state-owned land. In 1939, the Agriculture Improvement Institute was formed and embarked on a variety of projects across Xikang, including fertilizer plants, ranches, farms, plantations, and sericulture. In addition, the Institute installed weather monitoring stations across the province. Due to a lack of resources, none of these projects were particularly successful, save for perhaps the farm at Taining which was 2.5 million mu (Note: According to the 1930 Weights and Measures Act of the Republic of China, one mu is equivalent to 666^{2}/_{3} m^{2}.) in area and remained in existence as of 2021.

Although Liu maintained the Zhao-era policy that all wasteland or non-cultivated areas (huang) were state-owned, in practice state farms ended up renting even huang areas from landowners. This was because in the early Republican era, the government began selling deeds to the land in Xikang and charging taxes on the sale of deeds, deriving much profit from it. This state of affairs was not addressed by the Liu administration, perhaps due to the fact that much of the Qing-era uncultivated land was already being utilized. By 1940, income from the deed tax was equivalent to around one-third of that of the land tax.

==== Provincial development ====
It can be said that Liu Wenhui's development policies were biased towards the Kham area (Kangding–Luding), as per-capita spending and credit volumes were much higher here than anywhere else in Xikang. Although Liu did comment that the Ningshu area (Xichang) was favorable towards agricultural programs, he continued prioritizing Kham. Meanwhile, population boomed in Kangding and Han agricultural settlements slowly spread throughout the province.

From 1933 to 1935, some rudimentary infrastructure was constructed in his domain. This included a weapons repair shop (later expanded into a factory) and a military-political school to maintain his 24th Army. Technical schools were established for his administration and policing was strengthened. Several roads (including from Ya'an to Fulin) and canals were built or improved, hospitals and libraries were opened, and terraced farming was introduced in the rugged region. Xikang maintained an open economy encouraging private enterprise to increase trade incomes. Liu would boast of this as his "Ten Great Constructions", claiming it brought order and development to the province.

For his fortieth birthday in 1935, Liu allegedly donated the money he had received from gifts to build a bridge over the Ya River. State media such as The Paper mentions the existence of a bridge built in Ya'an, but it was constructed in 1944.

From 1939 on, Liu, as Governor of Xikang Province, tried to establish infrastructure to support it. Its transport and industrial capabilities were limited, which Liu attempted to remedy through major works. Throughout Liu's rule, new roads were constructed connecting the Kham and Yashu (Ya'an) areas to Sichuan and from Ningshu to Yunnan: however, none were made linking Kham and Ningshu. An airstrip was also built at Kangding. Certain large-scale projects such as the hydroelectric plant built in 1944 were made possible due to the central government's wartime mobilization and Liu Wenhui's stated stance to build up Xikang into a rear base to resist the Japanese from, which resulted in him gaining more subsidies from Chiang.

Liu also focused on healthcare, completing the Xikang Provincial Hospital in December 1941 and establishing health centers in Batang and Garzê in October 1941.

Liu's government also continued attempts to settle the frontier, proposing in 1938 to resettle 40,000 war refugees in Ningshu and noting that there was enough arable land in the region for 80,000 people. For Lawson, this was consistent with Liu's "long-standing colonial engagement with Kham" that he believed to be in China's national interest.

=== Relations with Tibet ===
In the fall of 1933, the 13th Dalai Lama sent an ultimatum to Liu Wenhui stating that Tibet would launch another attack if the 24th Army did not retreat further east. The ultimatum was not followed up because of the Lama's death on 17 December. In the wake of the ensuing political instability within the region, Liu cabled Nanjing for an expeditionary force to restore Chinese control over the entirety of Tibet. However, Dai Jitao and other close advisors to Chiang Kai-shek chose a more conciliatory policy and urged restraint on 23 December, which Liu Wenhui again ignored. Here, historian James Leibold speculates that Liu would probably have seized Lhasa had it not been for his untimely defeat at the hands of his nephew.

In 1934, the new Tibetan government of Jamphel Yeshe Gyaltsen was ready to pursue peace with the central government, as the war with Liu had drained the monasteries' resources and driven up the price of Chinese tea. Chiang dispatched General Huang Musong on a diplomatic mission to Lhasa, with the aim of getting Tibet to accept Chinese sovereignty in exchange for broad autonomy. This mission, although accepted by the Kashag, was foiled when Liu Wenhui met with Huang in Chengdu and urged a hard line on the border issue. This was anathema to the Tibetans who wanted a demilitarized buffer zone in Xikang to protect from Liu Wenhui's army. The negotiations ended in deadlock, and Leibold suggests that Chiang deliberately sided with Liu over the Tibetans in order to gain his support against Communist forces during the Long March—who had managed to slip through Xikang anyway.

Liu's later stance on Tibet was more pragmatic, arguing that development of Xikang was a prerequisite for dealing with Tibet. Here, he attempted to build connections with Tibetan elites through shared Buddhist ties and leverage the tea trade to strengthen economic relations. Every year or so after 1940, Liu would send around 30–40,000 yuan worth of tea to the three great monasteries of Tibet as offerings to the 14th Dalai Lama.

Liu maintained a military presence on the border with Tibet, which he would later use to justify his non-participation in the Second Sino-Japanese War. In late 1942, Chiang Kai-shek ordered Liu, as well as Ma Bufang in Qinghai, to deploy more troops on the border for the purposes of launching a military campaign against Tibet, which Liu accepted on the condition that he be granted extra military provisions and to personally take command of any reinforcements the central government would send. Plans for the campaign were eventually abandoned. Much later, it would be revealed through released materials from the Academica Historica that the Tibetan campaign was actually a pretext for the Chongqing government to assert direct control over Xikang.

=== Chinese Civil War: relations with Nationalists and Communists ===
Liu Wenhui's relationship with the Nationalist government continued to be one of grudging acceptance due to the fact that Xikang was too far from the central government in Nanjing to reliably influence or coerce. It is also believed by historian Kim Hee-shin that Chiang tolerated Liu's presence in Xikang to prevent the Sichuan warlord Liu Xiang from becoming too powerful. In 1936 Liu Wenhui's ties with Chiang soured even further due to his independent policy, but Chiang was not powerful enough to do anything meaningful against him at the time.

Liu's relationship had a cooperative relationship with Sichuan governor Zhang Qun, the leader of the KMT's Political Science Clique. Both men being Sichuan natives, Liu was able to appeal to these provincial ties to enlist Zhang's support in negotiations with Chiang. Zhang, for his part, supported Liu as a counterweight to other Sichuanese warlords.

In 1939, fighting broke out in Garzê between the officers of the deceased Panchen Lama and Liu Wenhui's army. Liu spread rumors about northern Kham potentially being granted to the Panchen Lama's office by the Kuomintang, and drove out the Lama's men. Although the Panchen Lama's forces were normally KMT-aligned, the central government remained on good terms with Liu Wenhui, who by now had taken advantage of the war against Japan to acquire more funding for Xikang.

In January 1947, an anti-Liu uprising led by Zhu Shizheng (朱世正) captured the towns of Lushan and Tianqian and attempted to take Ya'an. Nanjing newspapers supposedly celebrated the victory of the "Xikang Uprising" before Liu stabilized the situation and crushed the rebellion.

==== Second Sino-Japanese War ====
Liu played on patriotic sentiment during the War of Resistance against Japan. In 1937, he attended a meeting of the Ya'an Anti-Japanese National Salvation Association, admitting his past "mistakes" in fighting other Chinese. He also donated a sum of 500,000 yuan to the war effort. However, while other Sichuan warlords such as Liu Xiang, Yang Sen, Li Jiayu, and Wang Mingzhang sent troops to fight the Japanese, Liu Wenhui refrained from doing the same, citing the need to defend the Tibetan frontier and a lack of equipment. Therefore, Liu Wenhui's 24th Army did not directly participate in the war. Instead, Liu's policy was that of "resisting Japan by building Xikang." According to the state-run New Xikang Post (新康報), the province complied with the wartime orders of the central government regarding resource and population mobilization.

After the flight of the Nationalist government to Chongqing, Chiang became interested in establishing a presence in Xikang, proposing in either late 1938 or early 1939 to establish the "Xichang Headquarters" if ever Chongqing were to fall. To prepare for this task, he appointed Zhang Dulun, another of Liu's Baoding classmates, to lead the headquarters and moved the 36th (German-trained) division to Xichang. A power struggle developed in Xichang between Zhang and Liu, with Zhang attempting various measures to undermine Liu's control over Xichang. Zhang's tactics included propaganda, intelligence-gathering, and involvement in the opium trade, while Liu fought back with counter-propaganda and appointing loyalist magistrates who frustrated Zhang's work. Liu triumphed in 1942 when the 36th Division was moved to the Yunnanese front, and Zhang was transferred back to Chongqing in 1946. Zhang's presence was replaced by He Guoguang, but Liu continued frustrating Nationalist centralization attempts. In 1944 during Operation Ichi-Go, there was once again talk of moving the capital to Xichang, encouraged by American General Wedermeyer, but this was abandoned after the Japanese offensive stalled.

In late 1942, Chiang ordered Liu and Ma Bufang of Qinghai to mobilize for a campaign against Tibet. Liu was suspicious of the Nationalist leader's motivations, dispatching his chief of staff Wu Peiying (伍培英) to Chongqing to plan for the invasion and negotiate with Chiang. According to Liu's 1990 biography, he had asked for a fully-equipped division of 10,000 troops, cavalry, and engineers; another division to maintain order, winter equipment, around 10,000 yaks, additional food supplies, and a truck route from Sichuan to Xikang. Liu also requested that he take sole command of these reinforcements. Later archival documents would confirm Liu's suspicions that the campaign was a plot; once Liu had mobilized his forces, Chiang was to send 30,000 men under his personal command into Xikang and depose Liu. Due to Liu's stalling tactics as well as Allied pressure, the campaign did not materialize. Chiang's general He Yingqin then proposed building a highway from Kangding to Xining through Yushu, but Liu once again blocked Nationalist attempts to introduce its soldiers in Xikang.

Kim Hee-shin argues that Liu, in his dealings with various political factions, was mainly driven by political survival, with ideology playing little to no role in his considerations. This meant that although Xikang cooperated with the central government, he maintained ties with anti-Chiang factions and refused to let Nationalist garrisons into his province. An attempt by the Nationalist official H. H. Kung to more closely oversee Xikang's affairs in 1939 ended in failure after the representative he sent, Peter Goullart, was placed under house arrest by Liu's forces. To prevent the CC Clique from taking control of his province, Liu used his position as head of the provincial government to block their influence.

==== Contested activities during Long March ====
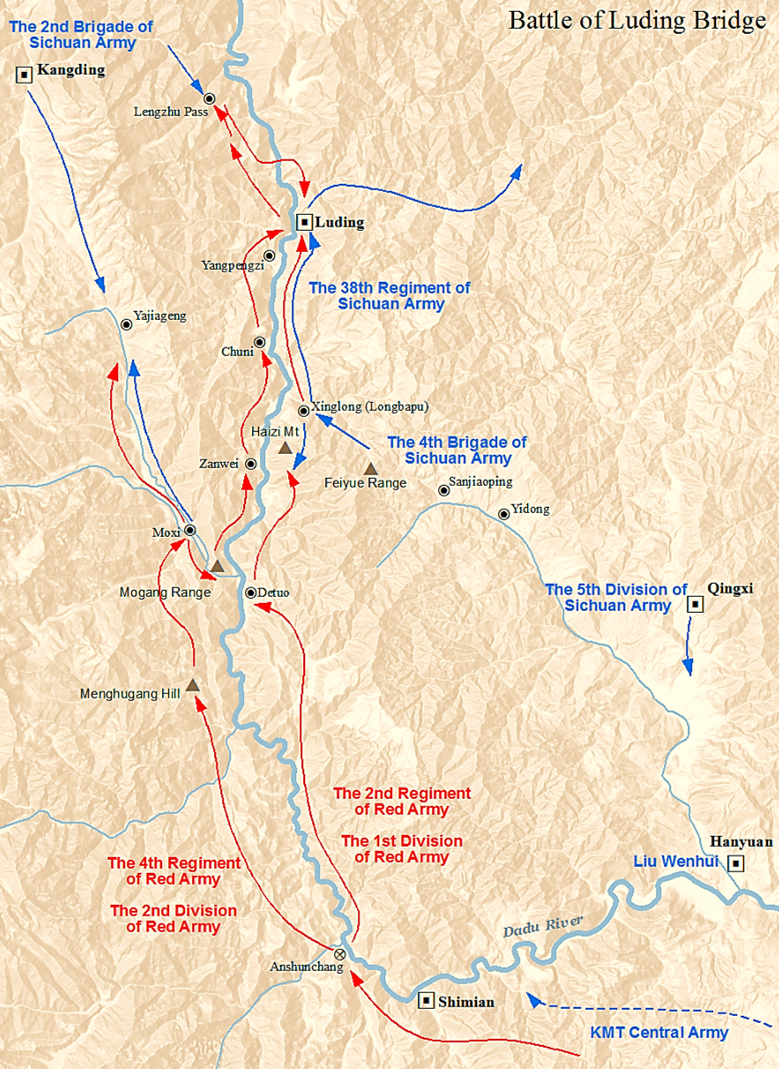
The Battle of Luding Bridge, which Liu Wenhui supposedly took part in.

Liu Wenhui's role in the Long March is described differently by various sources. According to one account, during the fight with Communist forces while the Long March was in process, Chiang Kai-shek repeatedly ordered Liu to bring his troops against the Communists, but Liu made excuses, while secretly allowing safe passage for the Chinese Red Army in a non-aggression pact. Thus, the engagements around Xiakou Village in 1934 did not involve Liu's 24th Army, but the 21st Army of KMT troops garrisoned just across the Sichuan border in Mingshan.

However, a contradictory account of his engagement with the Communists is given by the communist-aligned Guangming Daily, which states that during May 1935 Liu Wenhui was supposedly forced by Chiang Kai-shek to oversee the battle with the Red Army at Hanyuan. Liu's 24th Army suffered heavy losses during the battles of Dadu River and Luding Bridge.

Another report in his 1990 biography, also written in mainland China by the communist revolutionaries Peng and Shu, instead states that in May 1935 Chiang ordered Liu, as well as general Li Yunheng (李韞珩) of the 16th Army, to block the communist advance. Li's army had stationed at Kangding, and Li supposedly had ambitions to replace Liu's role as head of Xikang. To avoid expending his forces, Liu had his army stage a battle with the communists, firing into the air when necessary and faking reports to Chiang, letting the Red Army pass through Luding Bridge with minimal engagement. Liu's diplomatic outreach efforts to Liu Xiang and Zhang Qun successfully resulted in the 16th Army and other central government troops withdrawing from his province.

==== Contact with anti-Chiang organizations ====
Liu was reportedly influenced by the Xi'an Incident and the formation of the Second United Front in 1936, noting that the Communist Party was emerging as a major force in the country.

In 1938, Liu Wenhui then reportedly established contact with the Communist Party's Southern Bureau through his in-laws, including general Zhang Zhihe. Zhang Zhihe would become a member of the Central Committee of the China Democratic League (CDL). Another CDL Central Committee member he was in close contact with was Zheng Shufan. Around the time of its establishment in 1941, Liu began providing financial support to the CDL. In September 1944, Liu joined the China Democratic League, becoming a Central Committee member in 1945. Liu's membership, influenced by fellow Sichuan native and CDL chairman Zhang Lan, was kept secret. Peng Dixian, who would later become one of Liu's main biographers, asserts that he established a branch of the CDL in Xikang under Liu's auspices, serving as its chairman. Liu and the CDL would cooperate closely during the later Chengdu Uprising.

Over the course of the war with Japan, Liu had also been in contact with generals Li Jishen and Feng Yuxiang, who established the Revolutionary Committee of the Chinese Kuomintang (RCCK) in January 1948. On the urging of Li Jishen, Liu joined in the summer of 1948 as an underground member of the RCCK, becoming the Chairman of its Sichuan branch.

In the spring of 1948, Liu Wenhui's son Yuanyan, who was studying at West China University and had secretly come into contact with the Communist Youth League, came to Liu to act as an intermediary for negotiations with the Communist Party. However, Liu Wenhui told his son that he had already been in contact with the communists. This contact had happened in 1942, when Liu met with Zhou Enlai in Chongqing to discuss forming an anti-Chiang Kai-shek pact. Liu and Zhou reportedly agreed to jointly resist Chiang and to share intelligence; in a concession to the Xikang warlord, the communists also promised not to organize within Liu's 24th Army. This pact was exemplified by the existence of a covert communist radio station in Ya'an, established in June 1942 under the leadership of Wang Shaochun. This radio station provided Liu with pro-communist battle reports and propaganda, and operated continuously until 1949, helping coordinate the Chengdu Uprising.

In 1947, after the Nationalists captured Yan'an and put the communist forces on the backfoot, Liu temporarily stopped providing funding to the radio station; however, he resumed support soon after.

Zhou Enlai described Liu as a "political thermometer", who was "sometimes hot, sometimes cold" in his dealings with the Communist Party.

== Defection to Chinese Communist Party ==
=== Chengdu Uprising ===
By 1949, it was clear that the communist forces under the People's Liberation Army would triumph in the Chinese Civil War. In January, Liu Wenhui travelled to Nanjing to meet with Chiang Kai-shek and assess the political situation; he concluded that Chiang was losing the war and began preparations for defection.

Liu accelerated his plans after the Lanzhou Campaign concluded in August with a communist seizure of the city. He began intensifying contacts with underground communists in Sichuan, including Zhang Zhihe and Peng Dixian, in order to coordinate operations. Chiang had attempted to draw Liu out of Xikang by offering him a position as chairman of the Mongolian and Tibetan Affairs Commission, which was refused by Liu.

Liu's defection to the Communists occurred in the broader context of the Nationalist government's flight and retreat to Taiwan.

Sichuan was then ruled by general Wang Lingji, who Chiang had appointed as governor in April the past year. Wang's rule was unpopular with the Sichuan warlords, and Liu organized a movement to oppose Wang, joined by Xiong Kewu and Xiang Chuanyi. This association blocked Wang's military budget and unsuccessfully attempted appealing his removal. The communist authors Peng Dixian and Shu Guofan consider this to be a form of opposition to the Nationalist government.

By late 1949, Liu had come into contact with fellow Sichuanese generals Deng Xihou and Pan Wenhua to prepare an uprising. At the same time, Chiang Kai-shek had fled to Chongqing after the falls of Nanjing and Guangzhou, and attempted to make a stand in the Sichuan-Xikang area. However, the strategy collapsed when Chongqing fell to the Communists on October 30, and Chiang was once again forced to flee to Chengdu. At the time, Liu and his associates were also in Chengdu, and Yan Xishan had informed them that planes had been prepared for their final retreat to Taiwan.

On 2 December, Chiang dispatched Zhang Qun to demand that Liu cooperate with General Hu Zongnan in battle, as his 24th Army was not fighting against the communists. Liu continued to stall for more time until Chiang invited him for a meeting on 7 December. Believing this to be a trap, Liu and Deng Xihou fled to Peng County in hiding, with Pan Wenhua later arriving on 10 December. On 11 December, they sent a telegram to People's Liberation Army (PLA) commander Zhu De, backdated to the 9th, officially breaking ties with the Kuomintang and joining the communists under Mao Zedong. This event was known as the Chengdu Uprising. (Note: An alternative name for this event is the "Peng County Uprising")

=== Battle for Sichuan and Xikang ===
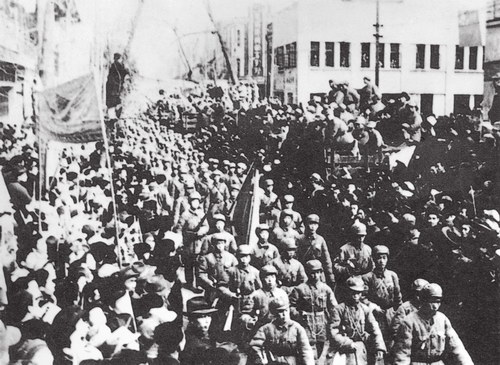
On 27 December 1949, the People's Liberation Army entered Chengdu.

The uprising had been coordinated in advance across the three regions of Xikang (Ningshu, Yashu, and Kham). In Kham and Yashu, Liu's forces successfully staged uprisings, but the case of Ningshu was a different one. Liu's chief of staff, Wu Peiying, had attempted to sway He Guoguang, the leader of the KMT's Xichang garrison. He professed to join the plot. However, during the uprising itself, He remained loyal to the KMT, launching an attack on Wu's forces on 13 December and forcing them out of Ningshu. Chiang Kai-shek proceeded to strip Liu of his Xikang governorship, granting the role to He instead. By February 1950, the PLA entered Xichang, but He and Hu Zongnan had escaped to Taiwan.

During the Chengdu Uprising, loyalist general Hu Zongnan occupied the city, but Liu's 24th Army had entered position along the Sichuan-Xikang highway to cut off a potential Nationalist retreat into Xikang. When Sichuan governor Wang Lingji attempted to do just that, his forces were defeated and he was captured on 25 December. By the 27th, Chengdu had been captured by the PLA; it was the last major city in mainland China to fall under Communist control. Communist historiography has praised Liu's actions as having contributed to the "peaceful liberation" of the Sichuan and Xikang regions.

== People's Republic of China (1949–1976) ==
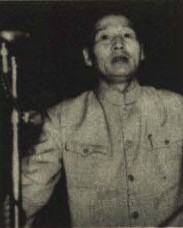
Liu Wenhui in 1950 as part of the Chinese People's Political Consultative Conference

Although Liu's family was anxious of their future under communist rule and considered fleeing to Hong Kong, Liu Wenhui encouraged them to stay in China and claimed the new government would treat them well. Mao Zedong appointed Liu as a Vice Chairman of the Southwest Military and Political Committee, where he served until 1954. He was also elected a member of the National Committee of the Chinese People's Political Consultative Conference and a member of the National People's Congress, and was also appointed to the Central Military Commission.

In June 1950, his 24th Army was merged with the 62nd Army of the People's Liberation Army. His nephew, Liu Yuanxuan, served as its deputy commander. In 1955, Liu was awarded the Order of Liberation, First Class for his role in the Chinese Civil War.

=== Mass campaigns and high office ===
Liu retained his political standing through active participation in the state's major mass campaigns. During the land reform movement, Liu announced at a conference that: "I once used to be a big landlord, but now I will unconditionally and unreservedly distribute the land to the peasants." According to Guangming Daily, this statement won him enthusiastic applause from the attendance. In 1955, during the Sufan campaign, Liu called for "greater vigilance" against "counterrevolutionaries". In 1956, he spoke in Chengdu on the occasion of the 90th anniversary of Sun Yat-sen's birth, publicly praising all of the Communist Party's political positions.

Politically, he was elected to the 3rd Central Committee of the Revolutionary Committee of the Chinese Kuomintang in 1954, serving until his death. He also served as Minister of Forestry from 1959 to 1967. In this capacity, he made reports on the state of forestry in China and carried out inspections in Jiangxi province as well as other regions. At the second National People's Congress in 1960 during the Great Leap Forward, Liu Wenhui declared that the country was in the midst of a "forestry revolution."

Liu Wenhui escaped persecution during the Cultural Revolution due to Zhou Enlai's protection, but he was unable to stop his older brother, Liu Wencai (who had died in 1949), from becoming demonized by state media and remembered in the popular imagination as a tyrannical and corrupt landlord. His grandson, Liu Shizao reportedly said that upon reading a news article on Liu Wencai's activities, Liu Wenhui stated, "What the hell are they talking about?"

He was also unable to stop Red Guards from associating him with Liu Wencai and ransacking his house in 1966. Although his son Liu Yuanyan in an interview by CCTV stated that he was never explicitly dismissed from the Forestry Minister post, he lost all authority in the wake of the chaotic Cultural Revolution. He had a negative opinion of the Cultural Revolution, stating, "An ironclad nation, smashed to pieces just like that!"; however, he did not make this sentiment public.

Liu's public statements during his latter period according to primary communist sources were focused on promoting Chinese reunification. In 1972, he wrote an article for the pro-Beijing Hong Kong newspaper Wen Wei Po, calling on his old colleagues in Taiwan to work towards unification. He reiterated these statements in a 1974 New Year's address.

=== Death and legacy ===
Several retrospective sources state that Liu was greatly saddened by Zhou Enlai's death in January 1976 and, according to Guangming Daily, even had himself carried on a stretcher to the Beijing Hospital to bid farewell to Zhou's remains. Having been diagnosed with cancer in 1975, Liu's own health deteriorated shortly after, and he died of his illness in Beijing on June 24, 1976. He was 81. (Note: Most sources, however, report that he died at the age of 82 due to East Asian age reckoning.) His memorial service was held at the Babaoshan Revolutionary Cemetery and was presided over by Vice Premier and general Chen Xilian.

The June 30, 1976 issue of the People's Daily reported that Vice Chairperson Li Suwen delivered Liu's eulogy. According to the eulogy, Liu Wenhui supported Chairman Mao, the Cultural Revolution, the movement to criticize Lin Biao and Confucius, and finally the ongoing campaign against Deng Xiaoping. He had also called for the liberation of Taiwan from Kuomintang rule. Present at his funeral were several politicians including Wu De, Li Jingquan, Ngapoi Ngawang Jigme, and Zhou Jianren, among others. Marshals Zhu De, Ye Jianying, and Liu Bocheng sent wreaths to the funeral, as well as Hua Guofeng and Song Qingling.

==== Historiography ====
Liu Wenhui retains a positive reputation in Chinese historiography, including a 2022 study by Wang Haibing, which credits his governance for promoting regional economic development and maintaining national unity. One of the main accounts of Liu Wenhui's life, a 1990 biography by Peng Dixian and Shu Guofan, is in itself written by authors who had directly participated in the events surrounding his defection and contact with the Communist Party (and more generally, the communist revolution.) Peng and Shu's biography generally characterizes Liu as a progressive and patriotic reformer, overcoming his warlord past to embrace the communist cause. Here, they assert that Liu's later alignment with the communists was the natural conclusion of his political evolution, and that his conviction towards the Communist Party became genuine over time.

Liu's own autobiographical account states that his initial opposition to Chiang Kai-shek and even his initial pro-communist tilt were purely out of pragmatic self-interest driven by a desire for political survival. According to Liu, he had become a committed communist over time after receiving political education from the Ya'an radio station during the Second Sino-Japanese War.

Western journalist A. Doak Barnett, who had travelled extensively in Xikang during the late 1940s, opined in 1993 that Liu's rule had been "one of the most oppressive and one of the worst warlord regimes in China." Academically, Western literature and scholarship treats Liu as a structural actor of Chinese frontier administration under pressure. To historian Joe Lawson, Liu's rule represents an evolution—not a break—of prior Qing-era ruler Zhao Erfeng's methods, influenced by pressures such as the political fragmentation of the Republican era.

Another historian, James Leibold, frames Liu's domain as a "parasitic polity" within the larger Chinese state, a peripheral nuisance that disrupted the Nanjing government's attempts at centralization. Leibold also mentions Liu's adoption by the PRC's historiography, influenced by his defection to the communist side, that frames him in heroic terms as a frontier developer, a protector of minority groups, and an anti-imperialist. Here, the unsavory aspects of Liu's rule, especially the more colonial-esque measures, are attributed to Chiang Kai-shek.

By September 2025, Liu Wenhui's former residence in Chengdu had become a museum. In January 2019, it was designated a party history education base by the Revolutionary Committee of the Chinese Kuomintang. Liu's residence has also been designated as a national priority protected site.

==== In media ====
In the 1998 Chinese movie The Great Military March Forward: Engulf the Southwest, Liu was played by actor Yang Ciyu.

In the 2009 Chinese historical drama The Founding of a Republic, Liu was played by filmmaker John Woo, but his role was cut from the final film.

== Personal life ==
=== Marriages and children ===
Liu Wenhui wed three wives from arranged marriages and had several children. His first marriage to Lady Gao occurred when he was only seventeen; he reportedly had no interest in her, leaving after only ten days to return to Baoding and focus on his military studies. Liu saw himself as more cosmopolitan and modern compared to his rural bride. After Liu left, Lady Gao fell into a deep melancholy and was ostracized by Liu's family.

On returning to Sichuan, Liu was arranged to marry a second wife, Lady Li Zhuqian. In 1920, she gave birth to Liu's first child, a daughter named Liu Yuankai. Although she was politically-engaged and involved in her husband's work, she became infertile due to illness and reportedly gave her assent for Liu to be married a third time to bear a male heir.

In 1924, he was arranged to marry his third wife, Yang Yunguang. His son, Liu Yuanyan, was born in 1928. According to his son, Liu's third marriage was arranged because he needed a "presentable" wife for social engagements as his military career advanced. Yang was also involved in Liu's work and was on cordial terms with Li Zhuqian. Both Li and Yang followed Liu during his retreat to Xikang, with Yang becoming one of his primary political partners.

=== Religious beliefs ===
Liu was a devout Buddhist, which Lawson believes may have influenced his religious policies of tolerance and patronization toward Tibetan Buddhists. In the 1920s, when he was stationed in Luzhou, Liu, like his nephew, came under the influence of the syncretic Taoist master Liu Congyun, becoming his disciple and taking on the Dharma name of Yuyou (玉猷). Peter Gouillart, a traveller in Xikang under the employ of the Nationalists, said that Liu was "superstitious and backward" and had fallen under the control of a certain "Soong Lama".

Liu also participated in fortune-telling and face reading.

== Positions held ==
- 1926–1949: Commander of the 24th Army of the National Revolutionary Army
- 1927–1929: Commander of the Sichuan-Xikang Defence Force
- 1927–1934: Chairman of Sichuan Province
- 1934–1939: Chairman of the Xikang Provincial Establishment Committee
- 1939–1949: Governor of Xikang Province
- 1949–1954: Vice Chairman of the Southwest Military and Political Committee
- 1949–1976: Member of the National Committee of the Chinese People's Political Consultative Conference
- 1949–1976: Member of the National People's Congress
- 1954–1976: Member of the Central Committee of the Revolutionary Committee of the Chinese Kuomintang
- 1959–1967: Minister of Forestry of the People's Republic of China
