= Xiong Kewu =

Chinese general (1885–1970)

Xiong Kewu 熊克武
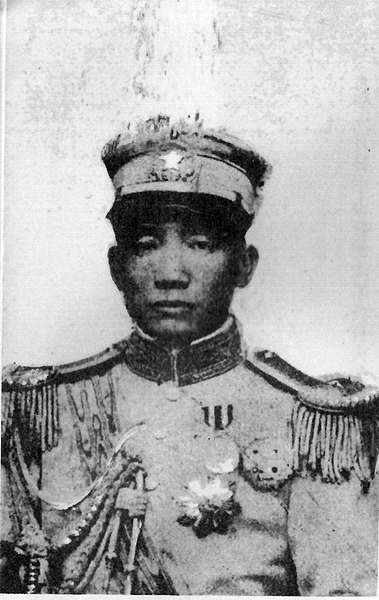
- Xiong Kewu (1928)

Commander-in-Chief of the Sichuan Anti-Bandit Army
- In office 25 July 1923 – 2 February 1924

Governor of Sichuan
- In office 29 November 1920 – 30 December 1920

Military Governor of Sichuan
- In office 25 February 1918 – 4 May 1920

Personal details
- Born: 26 December 1885 Jingyan County, Sichuan, Qing Empire
- Died: 2 September 1970 (aged 84) Beijing, China
- Party: Kuomintang
- Education: Dongbin Academy

Military service
- Allegiance: Republic of China; China
- Years of service: 1912–1954
- Rank: General
- Commands: Military Commander of Sichuan
- Battles/wars: Second Revolution; National Protection War; Spirit Soldier rebellions Northern Sichuan War (1923); Chinese Civil War

Xiong Kewu (Chinese: 熊克武; pinyin: Xióng Kèwǔ; December 26, 1885 – September 2, 1970), courtesy name Jinfan, was a Chinese general and warlord during the Republican period of China and a politician of the People's Republic of China.

== Biography ==
=== Early life ===
Xiong was born in Yanjingwan, Jingyan County, Sichuan Province, into a family of doctors and was interested in learning in his early years. In 1903 (29th year of Emperor Guangxu's reign), he entered Sichuan Dongwen Academy. At that time, he met Dai Jitao and other key figures of the revolutionary party who would later organize the Tongmenghui.

=== Revolutionary activities ===
In the winter of the same year, with the financial assistance of his uncle, he went to study in Japan. He first entered Dacheng Ordinary Middle School and later entered Dongbin Academy to study military affairs. While in Tokyo, Xiong Kewu met Sun Yat-sen and participated in the organization of the Tongmenghui in August 1905 (31st year of the reign of Emperor Guangxu). In December of the same year, he returned to China and planned anti-Qing uprisings in Sichuan, Guangdong and other places with Huang Xing and other comrades of the Tongmenghui.

In January 1912 (the first year of the Republic of China), the Sichuan Military Government was established in Chongqing. Xiong Kewu was recommended by Huang Xing to be the commander-in-chief of the army. In March, he was appointed as the commander of the 1st Division of the Sichuan Military Government. In April, the Dahan Sichuan Military Government established in Chengdu merged with the Sichuan Military Government. Xiong Kewu was appointed as the commander of the 5th Division of the Sichuan Army and continued to be stationed in Chongqing.

In July 1913 (the second year of the Republic of China), the Second Revolution broke out. On August 5, Xiong Kewu, Yang Shukan and others declared independence in Chongqing and fought against Yuan Shikai. In September of the same year, they were defeated by Sichuan Governor Hu Jingyi. Xiong Kewu fled to Japan and later went to Southeast Asia to raise funds for the revolution. In December 1915 (the fourth year of the Republic of China), he returned to China to participate in the National Protection War and returned to Sichuan with the 1st National Protection Army led by Cai E.

In June 1916 (the fifth year of the Republic of China), Yuan Shikai died. Cai E became the governor of Sichuan, and Xiong Kewu returned to serve as the commander of the 5th Division of the Sichuan Army and the garrison commander of Chongqing.

=== Fight for the control of Sichuan ===
Shortly after the end of the National Protection War, Cai E also resigned from the post of Sichuan Governor due to serious illness. The Sichuan Governor had been Luo Peijin of the Yunnan warlords, but the Sichuan warlords soon began to exclude non-Sichuanese. First, Liu Cunhou, the commander of the First Army of the Sichuan Army, launched a rebellion. Luo Peijin and the allied forces of Sichuan Governor Dai Kan (from the Guizhou warlord system) were defeated. Liu Cunhou gained control of Sichuan provincial politics in July 1917 and excluded the Guizhou warlords' National Protection Army from Sichuan. However, at the same time, Sun Yat-sen started the Protection of the Constitution Movement. After Liu Cunhou was appointed as the Sichuan Governor by the Beijing government of the Republic of China in December of the same year, Xiong Kewu decided to ally with the Protection of the Constitution Military Government to obtain legitimacy to send troops.

In January 1918, Xiong Kewu took office as the commander-in-chief of the Sichuan National Protection Army, and obtained the assistance of the Yunnan and Guizhou warlords to suppress Liu Cunhou's troops in the Sichuan National Protection War. On February 20, Chengdu fell, Liu Cunhou led his troops to retreat to northern Sichuan, and Xiong Kewu also went to northern Sichuan to pursue and suppress the rebellion. On February 25, Tang Jiyao appointed Xiong as the military commander and governor of Sichuan.

=== Governorship ===
After Xiong Kewu came to power, he immediately reduced the size of the Sichuan Army, which made the generals dissatisfied with him. The Yunnan warlords still occupied the southern Sichuan area, which made Xiong Kewu's governance in Sichuan insufficient. In order to consolidate his rule, Xiong Kewu echoed the idea of federal autonomy, but this led to the resentment of the Sichuan Army generals who were pro-Sun Yat-sen against Xiong Kewu.

In April 1920, Lü Chao, the commander of the 5th Division of the Sichuan Army, who was pro-Sun Yat-sen, launched an Anti-Xiong war at the instigation of Tang Jiyao, the commander-in-chief of the Sichuan-Yunnan-Guizhou Allied Forces. On July 18, the troops entered Chengdu. In order to reverse the unfavorable situation, Xiong Kewu reconciled with Liu Cunhou, who had fled to Shaanxi Province, and formed an alliance with Liu Xiang, the commander of the 2nd Army of the Sichuan Army, and Deng Xihou, the commander of the 2nd Division of the Sichuan Army, to form the "Jingchuan Army". In September of the same year, the Jingchuan Army defeated the Sichuan-Yunnan-Guizhou Allied Forces and expelled Lü Chao from Sichuan and exiled him to Shanghai. In October, Tang Jiyao also returned to Yunnan because of Lü Chao's defeat. In December of the same year, Xiong Kewu and Liu Cunhou led the Sichuan Army to issue a "Sichuan Autonomy" declaration, announcing that they were not affiliated with the Beijing and Guangzhou governments.

Although the Xiong-Liu coalition gained control of Sichuan, it was unable to share power. So Liu Cunhou once again sought support from the Beijing government, which again appointed Liu Cunhou as the Military Governor of Sichuan and Xiong Kewu as the Governor of Sichuan. However, Liu Cunhou soon resigned from the post of Sichuan governor on November 29 of the same year and was expelled by Xiong in March 1921.

In 1921 (tenth year of the Republic of China), due to the Sichuan-Hubei War, the conflict of interests between Liu Xiang and Xiong Kewu resurfaced, and led to the Battle of the First Army of the Sichuan Army led by Xiong Kewu and the Second Army of the Sichuan Army led by Liu Xiang the following year. In this battle, Xiong Kewu defeated Liu Xiang, causing Liu Xiang to resign. Yang Sen, who was allied with Liu Xiang, was expelled from Sichuan and retreated to western Hubei Province.

In 1922, in order to consolidate his rule in Sichuan, Xiong Kewu, together with Liu Chengxun, commander of the Third Army of the Sichuan Army, and Lai Xinhui, commander-in-chief of the Sichuan Frontier Defense Army, attempted to defeat the troops of Deng Xihou, Chen Guodong, and Tian Songyao. Wu Peifu, who was in charge of Beijing, took the opportunity to intervene in the Sichuan Civil War and supported Liu Xiang, who was frustrated in the Sichuan-Hubei War, to rebuild his troops and counterattack Sichuan. Due to the intervention of the Beijing government, Xiong Kewu's troops were unable to effectively counter the siege of foreign troops and internal anti-Xiong forces, and once again asked Sun Yat-sen for help.

On 25 June 1923, Sun Yat-sen appointed Xiong Kewu as the commander-in-chief of the Sichuan Anti-Bandit Army, and sent pro-Sun Yat-sen generals such as Lü Chao and Shi Qingyang, who were originally defeated by Xiong Kewu, to cooperate with Xiong Kewu, but there was no additional force to reinforce Xiong Kewu, so Xiong Kewu was completely defeated by the coalition forces of Liu Xiang, Yang Sen, Yuan Zuming, Deng Xihou, and Tian Songyao, and fled Sichuan to Changde, Hunan Province in the spring of 1924.

=== Fall from grace ===
In January 1924 (the 13th year of the Republic of China), Xiong Kewu was elected as a member of the Central Executive Committee at the First National Congress of the Kuomintang and entered the Kuomintang system to engage in politics. The Generalissimo of the Army and Navy of the Republic of China, Chiang Kai-shek, appointed Xiong Kewu as the commander-in-chief of the Sichuan Army for the Founding of the Republic, and hoped to use his reputation to gather Sichuan soldiers who were pro-Sun Yat-sen to build troops. Before Sun Yat-sen went north to discuss the unification of the north and the south, he sent a secret letter asking Xiong Kewu's troops to go north to take Wuhan. Xiong Kewu also communicated with Hu Jingyi, attempting to encircle the north and the south.

However, in the early 14th year of the Republic of China (1925), Sun Yat-sen died of illness and Hu Jingyi died suddenly, so all the related troop dispatch ideas could not be implemented. At the same time, Hunan Governor Zhao Hengti also decided to expel Xiong Kewu's troops. In March of the same year, Xiong Kewu's troops moved south to Guangdong and arrived in Guangzhou in September. However, in October, when Chen Jiongming lobbied Zhu Peide, a general of the Yunnan Army of the Republic of China, to betray the National Government, he claimed to Zhu that Xiong Kewu had been bribed by him. Zhu Peide informed the senior officials of the National Government of this matter. After Wang Jingwei, Xu Chongzhi, Tan Yankai, Chiang Kai-shek and others reached a consensus, Xiong Kewu was imprisoned in the Humen Fort on the charge of colluding with Chen Jiongming to plot to overthrow the National Government, and his troops were incorporated.

During his imprisonment, Xiong Kewu was not tried, but public opinion continued to pay attention to his whereabouts, so the Guangzhou National Government could not take any action against him. After Chen Jiongming's power collapsed and the National Revolutionary Army launched the Northern Expedition, Xiong Kewu was released at the end of March 1927, but he also lost his important position in the military and political circles. After that, he was appointed as a member of the National Government. Later, he engaged in social activities as a celebrity in Sichuan Province and a well-known anti-Chiang Kai-shek politician.

At the end of the Second Civil War between the Kuomintang and the Communist Party, Xiong Kewu and Liu Wenhui and other well-known military and political figures in Sichuan formed the Sichuan-Kang-Yu People's Self-Defense Committee in Chengdu. Xiong Kewu served as the chairman to fight against the rule of Sichuan Chairman Wang Lingji and effectively support the Chinese People's Liberation Army's invasion of Sichuan.

=== Political career under Communist China ===
After the founding of the People's Republic of China, he stayed in mainland China and served as Vice Chairman of the Southwest Military and Political Committee, Member of the National Committee of the Chinese People's Political Consultative Conference, Member of the Standing Committee of the National People's Congress, and Vice Chairman of the Central Committee of the Revolutionary Committee of the Chinese Kuomintang (RCCK).

On September 2, 1970, Xiong Kewu died of illness in Beijing at the age of 86 (84 years old).

== See also ==
- Second Revolution
- Yang Sen
- Tian Songyao
- Wu Peifu
- Liu Xiang

== Bibliography ==
- Ma Xuanwei "Xiong Kewu" Institute of Modern History, Chinese Academy of Social Sciences. Biographies of People in the Republic of China, Volume 11. Zhonghua Book Company. 2002. ISBN 7-101-02394-0
- Edited by Xu Youchun. Dictionary of Republican Personalities (revised edition). Hebei People's Publishing House. 2007. ISBN 978-7-202-03014-1
- Liu Shoulin et al., ed., Chronological Table of Officials in the Republic of China. Zhonghua Book Company. 1995. ISBN 7-101-01320-1
- Edited by Kuang Jishan and Yang Guangyan. History of Sichuan Military Affairs. Sichuan People's Publishing House. 1991. ISBN 7-220-01189-X
