= Wang Lingji =

Chinese general (1883–1967)

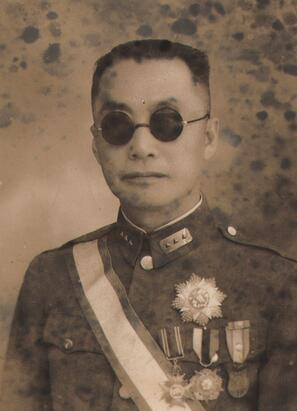
- Wang Lingji
- Born: 10 September 1883; Leshan, Sichuan, Qing dynasty
- Died: 17 March 1967 (aged 83); Beijing, People's Republic of China
- Allegiance: Republic of China
- Branch: (Republic of China (1912–1949)) National Revolutionary Army
- Commands: 30th Army Group
- Battles / wars: Second Revolution; Chinese Civil War; Second Sino-Japanese War; Battle of Wuhan; Battle of Nanchang; First Battle of Changsha; 1939–40 Winter Offensive; Battle of Shanggao; Second Battle of Changsha; Third Battle of Changsha; Battle of West Hubei; Battle of Changde; Fourth Battle of Changsha
- Awards: Order of the Cloud and Banner

Wang Lingji (Chinese: 王陵基) (10 September 1883 – 17 March 1967) was a Kuomintang general from Sichuan. In 1913, he fought against the Beiyang government and the Chinese Workers' and Peasants' Red Army. He commanded the 30th Army Group from April 1938 to October 1945. He fought against the Imperial Japanese Army in Hubei; Jiangxi and Hunan during the Second Sino-Japanese War.

== Chinese Civil War and later life ==
He was provincial chairman of Jiangxi from March 1946 to April 1948 and provincial chairman of his home province from April 1948 to December 1949. On December 11, 1949, Sichuan clique warlords Deng Xihou and Liu Wenhui surrendered Chengdu to the advancing People's Liberation Army, resulting in Wang's arrest by the forces of the Chinese Communist Party. Wang was imprisoned by the authorities of the People's Republic of China until December 1964. He died of heart disease and hypertension at the age of 83 in a hospital in Beijing, unable to receive medical treatment due to the Cultural Revolution.

== Bibliography ==
- 劉識非「王陵基」中国社会科学院近代史研究所 (1997). 民国人物传 第9卷. 中華書局. ISBN 7-101-01504-2.
- 徐友春主編 (2007). 民国人物大辞典 増訂版. 河北人民出版社. ISBN 978-7-202-03014-1.
- 劉国銘主編 (2005). 中国国民党百年人物全書. 团結出版社. ISBN 7-80214-039-0.
- 劉寿林等編 (1995). 民国職官年表. 中華書局. ISBN 7-101-01320-1.
