= Rao Guohua =

Chinese general (1894–1937)

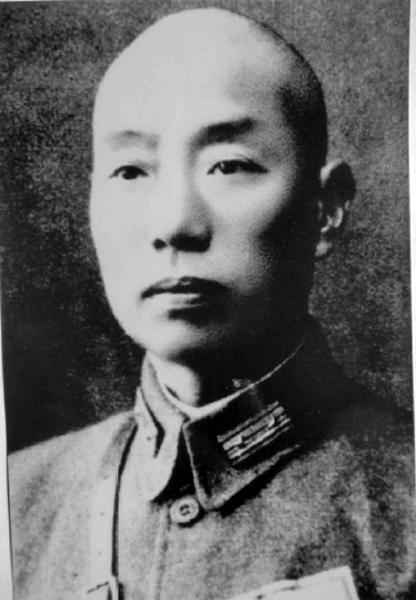
- Born: 1894; Ziyang, Sichuan Province
- Died: December 1, 1937 (aged 42–43); Xuancheng, Guangde, Anhui Province
- Allegiance: Republic of China
- Service / branch: National Revolutionary Army
- Battles / wars: Second Sino-Japanese War

Rao Guohua (1894 – December 1, 1937) was a Sichuan clique Chinese general who committed suicide during the Second Sino-Japanese War.
