= Two-Liu War =

Warlord era conflict in Sichuan

- Part of the Nanjing decade
| Date | October 1932 – December 1932 |
| Location | Sichuan, China |
| Result | Liu Xiang's victory |
| Territorial changes | Liu Xiang gained southwest Sichuan; Liu Wenhui gained Xikang |

Belligerents
| Liu Wenhui | Liu Xiang |
| | Li Zhixing and Luo Zezhou |
| | Yang Sen |

Strength
| 200,000 of the 24th Army | 100,000 of Liu Xiang's 21st Army; 11 bombers 2 warships 18,000 from Li Zhixing and Luo Zezhou 30,000 of Yang Sen' 20th Army |

Casualties and losses
| 1,000–9,000 | 1,000–9,000 |
- No estimates for civilian casualties are provided.

The 'War to Stabilize Sichuan', popularly known as the Two-Liu War (Chinese: 二劉之戰) was a brief three-month conflict fought between Liu Wenhui and Liu Xiang in Sichuan during the Nanjing decade from October to December 1932. The wider repercussions of the war led to the growth of power of the central government of the Republic of China in the province.

== Background ==
Sichuan at the time was divided into six garrison areas each commanded by a warlord. Despite the unification of China in 1928 following the Northern Expedition, tensions between the local Sichuan warlords remained high, engaging in arms races and recruiting larger numbers of men, which was ideologically opposed by the Nanjing government. The two members of the Liu family were Liu Xiang and his uncle Liu Wenhui. Liu Xiang controlled the eastern third of Sichuan along with the provincial capital Chongqing. Prior to the war, the two relatives enjoyed amiable relations purchasing a joint air force and armored car force. Liu Xiang would have ambitions to seize more land and wealth as typical of warlords of the era. Liu Wenhui had also been luring away Liu Xiang's officers with higher pay, something he did to the other warlords within the province. Sichuanese armies of this period did not possess much weaponry beyond rifles, with mountain guns and machine guns being an oddity on the battlefield. Therefore, the advantage of planes and armored cars increased due to the lack of anti-aircraft weaponry or anti-tank weaponry.

== War ==
In October 1932, Liu Xiang declared 'the war to stabilize Sichuan' though due to the familial nature of the war it was quickly given the name the Two-Liu War.

=== October Offensive of Liu Xiang ===
==== Battle of Chengte ====
On 8 October forces of Liu Xiang were defeated whilst attempting to seize the city.

==== Battle of Yungchen ====
On 10 October 7,000 of Liu Wenhui's soldiers defected to the army of Liu Xiang after a defeat.

==== Tibetan Raids ====
Tibetan tribesmen encouraged by the warfare invaded the province of Xikang and began raiding the province. The incident led to calls for peace which saw a brief end to the fighting until the 21st when it restarted due to movements by the armies of Liu Xiang.

==== Withdrawal from the east ====
Liu Wenhui ordered his men to withdraw towards the western towns of Dongnan, Jiangzhun, Yongzhan and Dazhu. Liu Xiang pursued his uncle's army as it retreated both sides resorted to pressganging to recruit soldiers and porters for their armies.

==== Conflict in the west ====
As Liu Xiang's forces and those of his allies approached the west, they began attacking with Liu Xiang's airforce launching bombing raids on the enemy. on 28 October Yang Sen's forces reached the Western gates of Chengdu, where after heavy fighting in the suburbs they were repeatedly beaten back.

=== Conflict until July ===
Liu Xiang's forces took Chengdu, Yangchun and Kiangtsin. Liu Wenhui unable to import weaponry, due to a ban by the Central Government in Nanjing aiming to stop the conflict, was unable to re-equip his forces or raise new ones with the rapid nature of the warfare foreign importation was too lengthy of a process.

On 9 November following a bloody battle at Luzhou, Liu Wenhui withdrew to the western bank of the Tuojiang with 90,000 men defending the riverbank.

Liu Xiang rejected an overture for peace from Liu Wenhui and thoroughly defeated his enemy at the Battle of the Tuojiang. Following the battle, Liu Wenhui attempted suicide but was saved by a local doctor and made a full recovery. On 29 December, Liu Wenhui began negotiations for peace offering to resign his governorship of Sichuan and withdraw his forces to Xikang province in order to establish a new warlord base in that province with the still large forces under his command.

This was accepted by his enemies and Liu Wenhui's army withdrew into Xikang, with minor clashes occurring in Sichuan as they withdrew.

== Aftermath ==
In late December 1932, forces of the 4th Route Army entered Sichuan and after an initial settlement, they were driven off in spring 1933. Later that year, they returned, occupying 14 counties and capturing a supply dump at Suiding. Liu Xiang and other warlords, fearing the arrival of more communist forces currently in Guizhou conducting the Long March, began preparing for war against the 4th Route Army. Liu Xiang's offensive with his warlords failed due to infighting. Liu Xiang like many warlords was a notorious extractor of wealth via taxes but even this was not sufficient as the large costs of the war led to payment of workers falling into arrears and strikes ensued. Liu Xiang was forced to appeal for Chiang Kai-shek for assistance which was forthcoming but at the cost of autonomy.
