= Li Jiayu =

Chinese general (1892–1944)

- 李家鈺
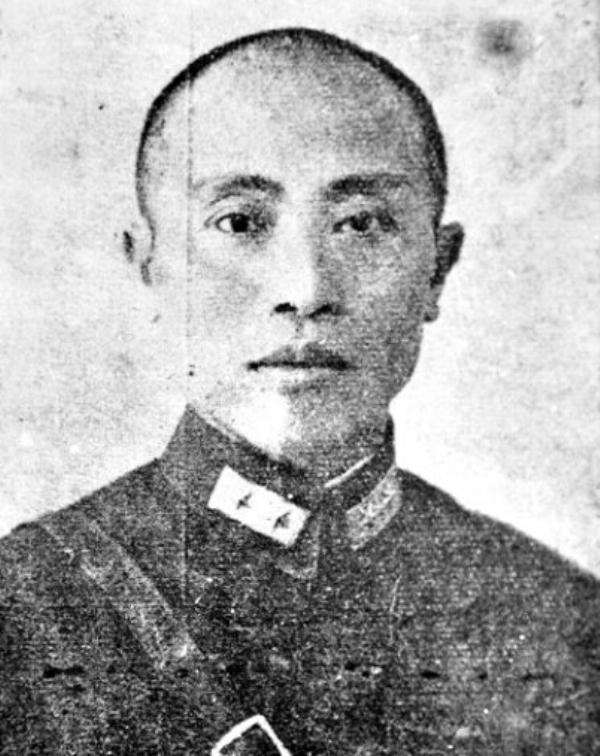
- General Li Jiayu
- Born: 25 April 1892
- Died: 21 May 1944 (aged 52)
- Military career
- Allegiance: Republic of China
- Branch: National Revolutionary Army; Republic of China Army
- Service years: 1915–1944
- Rank: General
- Conflicts: Xinhai Revolution; Second Revolution; Second Sino-Japanese War; Operation Ichi-Go †

Li Jiayu (traditional Chinese: 李家鈺; simplified Chinese: 李家钰; pinyin: Lǐ Jiāyù) (April 25, 1892 – May 21, 1944) was a Chinese KMT general from Sichuan who was killed during the Second Sino-Japanese War. A veteran of the Xinhai Revolution and the Second Revolution, he served as a regimental officer in the 6th Brigade of the Sichuan clique army, which was part of the Sichuan clique Army 3rd Division commanded by warlord Deng Xihou. He was promoted to commanding officer of the 6th Brigade in 1922 by his superior officer Deng and later promoted to major general and commander of the 1st Division of the Sichuan clique Army in September 1923. In August 1924, he was promoted to Lieutenant General in the Sichuan clique army. On May 21, 1944, he was killed in action in Henan province. On June 22, 1944, he was posthumously promoted to full General.
