= Sichuan clique =

Group of Chinese political factions

- 川軍
- Sichuan Provincial Government Seal
- Country: Republic of China: Great Han Sichuan Military Government (1911–1912)
- Allegiance: Beiyang government Nationalist government
- Type: Warlord clique
- Engagements: Xinhai Revolution; Northern Expedition; Second Sino-Japanese War

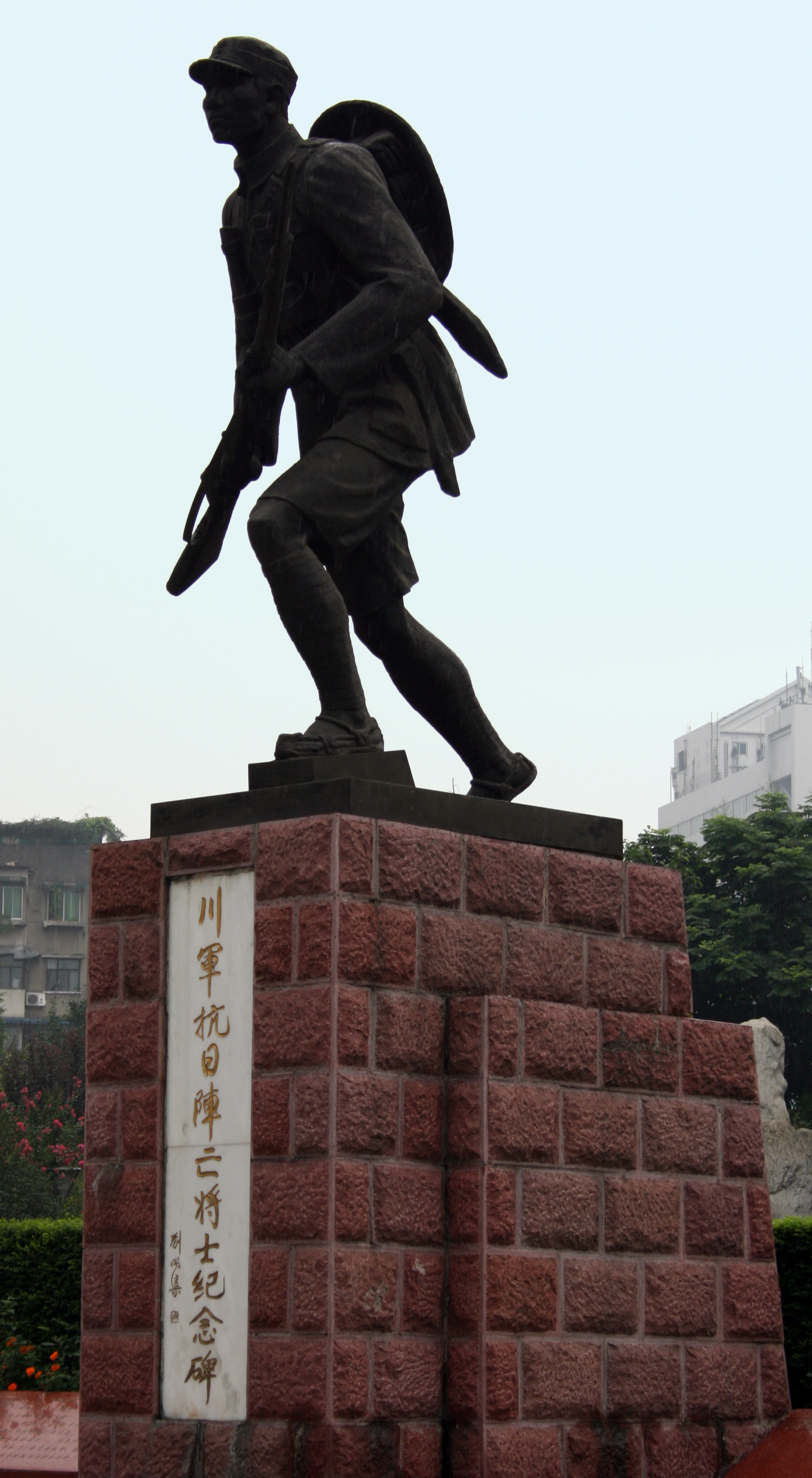
Monument to the Sichuan Army Martyrs of the Second Sino-Japanese War, which is located in People's Park, Chengdu

The Sichuan clique (simplified Chinese: 川军; traditional Chinese: 川軍; pinyin: Chuān Jūn) was a group of warlords in the warlord era in China. During the period from 1927 to 1938, Sichuan was in the hands of six warlords: Liu Wenhui, Liu Xiang, Yang Sen, Deng Xihou, He Zhaode, and Tian Songyao, with minor forces being Xiong Kewu and Lü Chao.

== Introduction ==
After the Qing dynasty's collapse, not one warlord had enough power to take on all the others at once, so many small battles occurred, pitting one warlord against another. The Sichuan Clique was divided into smaller warlord groups, or Defense Zones, separated from each other with distinct military, political, and economic boundaries. Large conflicts seldom developed, plotting and skirmishing characterized the Sichuanese political scene, and ephemeral coalitions and counter-coalitions emerged and vanished with equal rapidity.

However, Liu Xiang was the most influential of the Sichuan warlords. He controlled Chongqing and its surrounding areas. This region, sitting on the banks of the Yangtze river, was rich because of trade with provinces down river and therefore controlled much of the economic activity in Sichuan. From this position of strength, between 1930 and 1932 General Liu Wenhui and Liu Xiang improved their forces, organizing a small airforce and an armored car force.

In 1935 Liu Xiang ousted his uncle and rival warlord, Liu Wenhui, becoming Chairman of the Government of Sichuan Province with the support of Chiang Kai-shek.

In economic affairs, there was abusive minting and issuance of currency.

== World War II ==
In the Second Sino-Japanese War, the Sichuan clique made a huge contribution to oppose the Japanese army. Out of the 3.5 million Sichuan soldiers who participated in the war, 263,991 were killed, 356,267 were wounded, and 26,025 went missing, for a total of more than 640,000 casualties out of the 3,227,926 casualties suffered by the National Revolutionary Army in the 8-year war. From 1939 to 1945, the National Revolutionary Army had 850,000 killed in action, including 260,000 from the Sichuan clique. In the Battle of Shanghai, almost all 170,000 soldiers from Sichuan clique fell in battle, with only 2,000 managing to retreat to Hubei Province. Nine generals of the National Revolutionary Army died in World War II, of whom generals Li Jiayu, Wang Mingzhang and Rao Guohua were commanders from the Sichuan clique.

== Memento ==
On August 15, 1989, Chengdu City Government constructed new sculpture for memento at Wannian, Chengdu.

== See also ==
- Warlord era
- List of Warlords
- New Army, predecessor of Sichuan clique
