= Liu Cunhou =

Chinese warlord and general (1885-1960)

Liu Cunhou 劉存厚
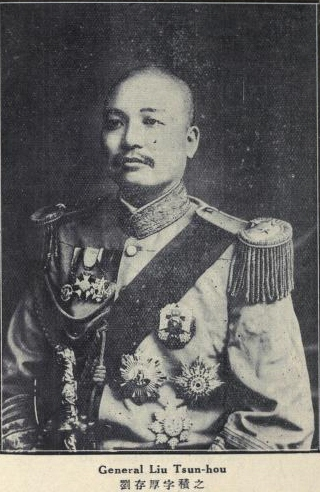
- Liu Cunhou, c. 1925
- Born: 24 January 1885; Jianzhou, Sichuan, Qing China
- Died: June 1960 (aged 75) Taipei, Taiwan
- Allegiance: Qing dynasty; Republic of China
- Service years: 1907-1933
- Rank: General
- Conflicts: Xinhai Revolution; Second Revolution; National Protection War; Chinese Civil War

Liu Cunhou (traditional Chinese: 劉存厚; simplified Chinese: 刘存厚; Wade–Giles: Liu Tsun-hou; 24 January 1885 - June 1960) was a Republic of China general and warlord of the Sichuan clique during the Warlord Era. He later joined the National Revolutionary Army but was forced to retire after his forces were defeated by the Chinese Communists in 1933.

== Biography ==
Liu was born in Jianzhou (now Jianyang) in 1885. He entered the Sichuan Military Academy and graduated in 1907. He then went to Japan to study. He returned to China in 1909, where he joined the Tongmenghui in Yunnan. During the 1911 Revolution, he rebelled along with Cai E and led Yunnan Army troops into Sichuan. After the establishment of the Republic of China, Liu became a subordinate of Yin Changheng and became a commander of the 4th Division of the Sichuan Army. During the Second Revolution, Liu supported Yuan Shikai and was given command of the 2nd Division. However, he later supported the rebelling forces during the anti-Yuan National Protection War.

Liu later became the Beiyang government-appointed governor of Sichuan. He was opposed by Xiong Kewu, who defeated him in 1918. Liu then fled to Shaanxi. In 1920, the Yunnan clique invaded Sichuan, and Liu aligned himself with Xiong Kewu and became governor of Sichuan once again. In 1921, Liu's governorship was challenged by other members of the Sichuan clique, so he fled to the Shaanxi border. He was appointed by the Beiyang government as the Sichuan-Shaanxi Border Guard Inspector and the Sichuan Army Inspector, but he held little influence and power.

In 1928, Liu joined the Nationalist government and became the commander of the National Revolutionary Army's 23rd Army in May 1933. In October 1933, he was defeated in Sichuan by Chinese Red Army forces led by Xu Xiangqian and forced to retire from the military. He then went to Chengdu to live in seclusion.

In 1948, Liu served as a representative of the National Congress of the Kuomintang in the National Assembly. With the Kuomintang defeat in the Chinese Civil War, Liu fled to Taiwan with the help of his former classmate Yan Xishan. In Taiwan, he was hired as a national policy advisor to the presidential office.

Liu lived as a melon seller in Taipei in his twilight years. He died in June 1960.
