= Peter Goullart =

Russian-born traveller, explorer, and author

- Пётр Гуляр
- Photo of Peter Goullart in China from his book Forgotten Kingdom
- Born: 1901; Russian Empire
- Died: June 5, 1978 (aged 76–77); Singapore
- Notable work: Forgotten Kingdom

Peter Goullart (Russian: Пётр Гуляр) (1901 - June 5, 1978) was a Russian-born traveler, explorer and author, who is best known for a number of books describing the life and customs of various peoples living in remote parts of East and Southeast Asia.

== Life ==
Goullart was born in Russia in 1901 into a well-educated family, and spent his youth in Moscow and Paris. He was interested in the Orient from an early age. After Bolshevik Revolution he fled to China and eventually settled in Shanghai in 1924. He perfected his Chinese and worked as a tour guide for Western tourists and businesspeople, accompanying them on their trips throughout East and South-East Asia. During this time he developed an interest in Daoism and in exploring the remote mountainous areas of Western China.

In 1939 following the Japanese invasion of China, Goullart secured an appointment as a representative of the Chinese Industrial Cooperatives (an agency of the Kuomintang Government), first in what is now western Sichuan, then in 1942 in the ancient city of Lijiang, in the North-Western corner of Yunnan Province.

He lived in Lijiang for over eight years at the time when it was an important transit stop on the vital trading and supply route from India to China during World War II. Goullart documented life and customs of inhabitants of this remote region, in particular, Nakhi People, in his first book, Forgotten Kingdom.

In 1949 shortly after the communist takeover, Goullart left Lijiang on a chartered plane to Kunming together with the botanist and explorer Joseph Rock. He left China and then lived and worked in Singapore, and continued to write about his travels throughout Southeast Asia. All his books were written and published in English. He died in the house of his friend Desmond Neill in Singapore on June 5, 1978.

== Works ==
- Goullart, P., Report on the industrial cooperatives of Likiang, Yunnan, 1945.
- Goullart, P., Forgotten Kingdom, J. Murray, 1955.
- Goullart, P., Princes of the Black Bone. Life on the Tibetan Borderlands, J. Murray, 1959. (published in the US as Land of the lamas: Adventures in secret Tibet, Dutton, 1959)
- Goullart, P., The Monastery of Jade Mountain, J. Murray, 1961.
- Goullart, P., River of the White Lily: Life in Sarawak (Malaysian heritage series), J. Murray, 1965.
