= Yang Sen =

Sichuan warlord and general

- 楊森
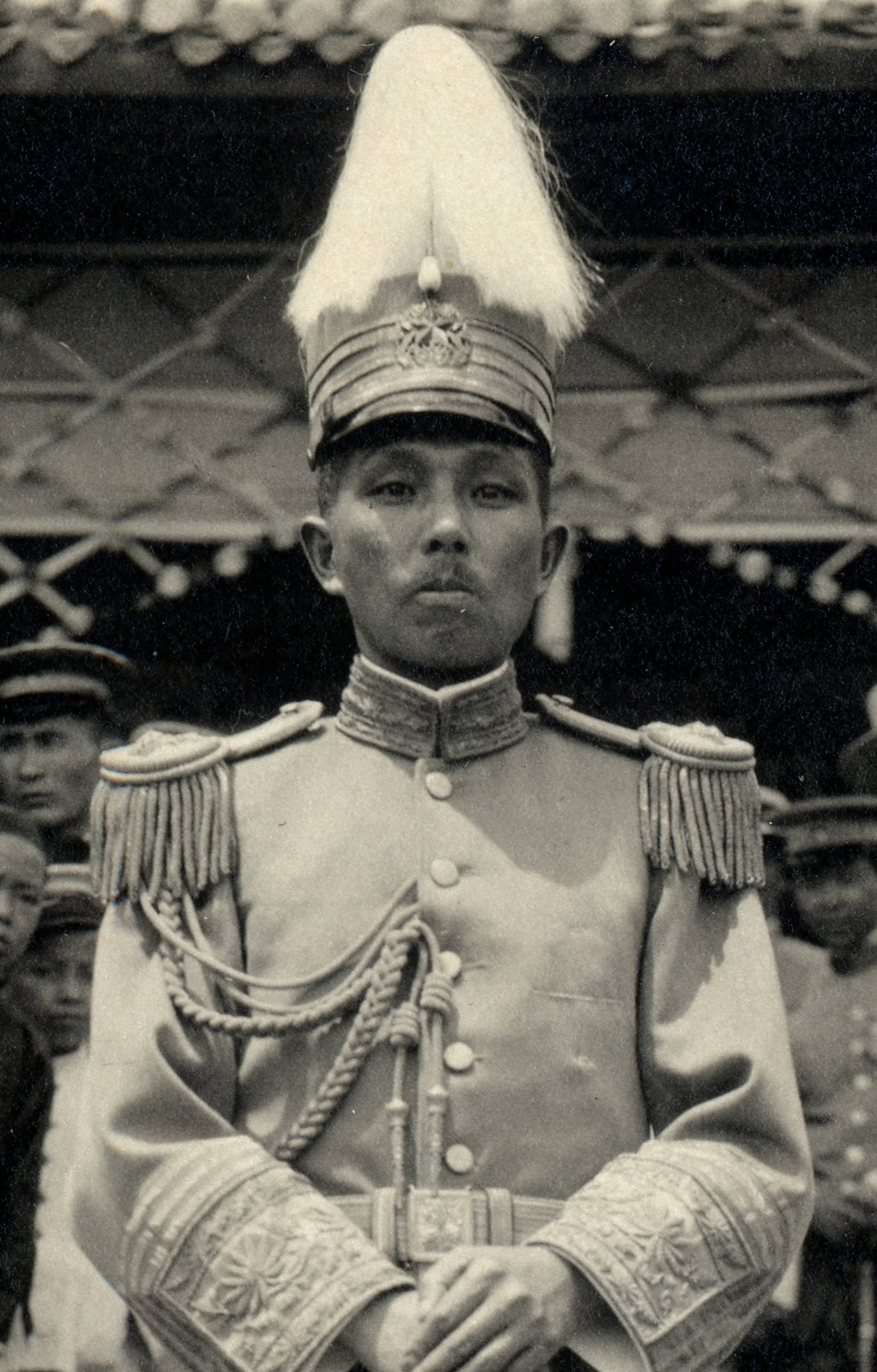
- Yang Sen, c. 1920s
- Born: 20 February 1884; Guang'an, Sichuan, Qing dynasty
- Died: 15 May 1977 (aged 93); Taipei, Taiwan
- Relatives: Yang Hanxiu (楊漢秀, niece, 1913-1949); Yang Hanlie (楊漢烈, son, 1917-1987)
- Military career
- Allegiance: Qing Dynasty; Republic of China
- Service years: 1904–1977
- Rank: General
- Unit: Beiyang Army National Revolutionary Army
- Commands: Governor of Sichuan Province, Military-Governor of Sichuan Province, General Officer Commanding XX Corps, Commander in Chief 27th Army Grou, Deputy Commander in Chief 6th War Area, Deputy Commander in Chief 9th War Area, Chairman of the Government of Guizhou Province
- Conflicts: Xinhai Revolution; North Expedition; Central Plains War; Second Sino-Japanese War; Chinese Civil War
- Awards: Order of Blue Sky and White Sun
- Other work: Politician

Yang Sen (Chinese: 楊森; pinyin: Yáng Sēn; 20 February 1884 – 15 May 1977) was a warlord and general of the Sichuan clique who had a long military career in China. Although he was a provincial warlord, he served Chiang Kai-shek and his Kuomintang (KMT) government, especially during the Second Sino-Japanese War. He also served as governor of Sichuan and Guizhou provinces. After the Communists defeated the KMT in the Chinese Civil War, he retreated with the KMT government to Taiwan.

He was also known as a Taoist master and had numerous wives, concubines and children. He published a book about the supercentenarian Li Ching-yuen, who supposedly lived 197 or 256 years.

== Career ==
Yang was born into a scholarly landowner family. He graduated from the Sichuan Army Primary School in 1906 and the Sichuan Military Academy in 1910. He quickly rose through the military ranks, gaining control of Sichuan during the warlord era. Yang served as the governor of Sichuan from 1924 to 1925. During the 1926 Wanhsien Incident, his troops clashed with British patrol vessels on the Yangtze river. He joined the Kuomintang in 1926, choosing to side with Chiang Kai-shek's faction following the party split in 1927. He suppressed the communists in Sichuan in 1935, and when the war with Japan began in 1937 he was the first Sichuan clique general to order his troops to the frontlines. From 1933 to 1938, he was general officer of the XX Corps, and from 1938 to 1944 Commander in Chief of the 27th Army Group. From 1939 to 1940 he was the Deputy Commander in Chief of the 6th War Area, and from 1940 to 1945 Deputy Commander in Chief 9th War Area. He served as he served as the chairman of the Guizhou government from 1945 to 1948, governor of Guizhou from 1945 to 1947, and as mayor of Chongqing from 1948 to 1949.

Following the Kuomintang evacuation to Taiwan, he served as an advisor in the Presidential office in Taipei. An avid sports person, he was the Republic of China's Olympic Committee Chairman and at the Olympic Games in Mexico carried the national flag of Taiwan, Republic of China in the opening ceremony. He was a well-known mountaineer and the chairman of the Taiwan Mountain Climbing Association and chairman of the Chinese National Athletic Foundation. Yang was known to have numerous wives and concubines. He claimed to have 43 children; 22 daughters and 21 sons, the first born in 1912 and the last in 1960, when he was 76. Yang Sen died in Taipei of lung cancer in 1977 at age 93.

== Meeting Master Li Ching Yuen ==
General Yang knew the Taoist Master Li Ching-yuen personally and became his disciple, practicing his teaching until the end of his life.

In 1927 he invited him to his residence in Wanxian, Sichuan. After his master's death, General Yang wrote the report "A Factual Account of the 250 Year-Old Good-Luck Man.", where he described Li Ching Yuen's appearance: "He has good eyesight and a brisk stride; Li stands seven feet tall, has very long fingernails, and a ruddy complexion."

== See also ==
- Order of battle of Battle of Wuhan
- Warlord Era

Preceded by Zhang Dulun	Mayor of Chongqing; 1948–1949	Succeeded by Chen Xilian
