= Tian Songyao =

Chinese warlord and Kuomintang general

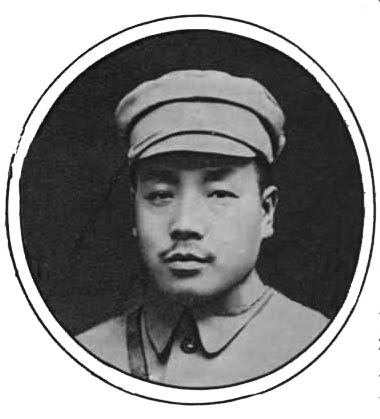
Tian Songyao in 1930

Tian Songyao (simplified Chinese: 田颂尧; traditional Chinese: 田頌堯; pinyin: Tián Sòngyáo; also Romanized as Tin Chung-yao; 1888 – 1975) was a warlord of the Sichuan clique, Kuomintang general, later official of People's Republic of China.

Tian Songyao was born on 1888 in Jianyang, Sichuan. Tian joined the Sichuan Army and rose to command a Cavalry Regiment, of the 2nd Division, of its 1st Army. He also was the garrison commander of Chengdu from 1916 to 1918. In 1918, Tian was promoted to command the Beijing Government's 41st Brigade of the 21st Division. Later the same year Tian became the 21st Division commander, a post which he held until 1925.

In 1925, Tian became Deputy Head of Sichuan Province Military Affairs, and in 1926 the General commanding the North-western Sichuan Garrison and was given command of the 29th Army. From 1927 to 1928 he was a member of the National Military Council. From 1928 to 1933 he was the head of the Civil Administration Department and a committee Member of the Sichuan Provincial Government.

In 1933, he returned to military affairs commanding Sichuan-Shanxi Border Area Bandit/Communist Suppression then from 1933 to 1935 he was the general commanding the 2nd Detachment, Sichuan Bandit Suppression Headquarters attempting with little success in stopping the Long March that passed through Sichuan. In 1936 he was made a member of the National Military Council but was excluded from office and command from then on. This may have prompted him to revolt against the Nationalist Government in 1949. He later was a member of the Sichuan Provincial Chinese People's Political Consultative Conference. He died in Chengdu on 25 October 1975.
