= Deng Xihou =

Chinese general and warlord

- 鄧錫侯
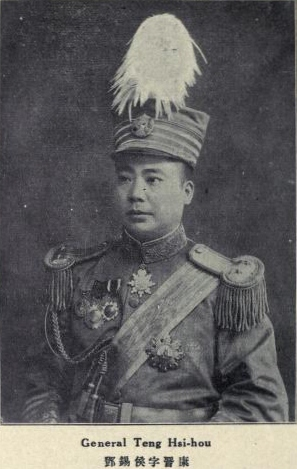
- Deng Xihou as Governor of Sichuan under the Beiyang Government, 1925
- Born: 24 May 1889
- Died: 30 March 1964 (aged 74)
- Military career
- Allegiance: Republic of China; China
- Rank: General

Deng Xihou (traditional Chinese: 鄧錫侯; simplified Chinese: 邓锡侯; pinyin: Dèng Xīhóu; 24 May 1889 – 30 March 1964) was a Chinese general and prominent warlord of Sichuan. He joined the Qing Imperial Army, and then went on to serve under the Beiyang Government and the Nationalist Government before finally defecting to the Communists of Mao Zedong and holding political office in the People's Republic of China.

== Biography ==
Deng was born in 1889 in Yingshan, Sichuan. In 1906 he was admitted to the Sichuan Military School of the Qing Imperial Army, graduating in 1909. He then entered the Nanjing Army School for advanced study, but after the Xinhai Revolution, he discontinued his studies and returned to Sichuan. After the Beiyang Government of the Republic of China was established, Deng joined the Sichuan 4th Division of warlord Liu Cunhou. He successively held the posts of adjutant, company commander, and battalion commander.

In 1917 he became commander of the 5th Brigade and in February 1918 commander of the Sichuan Independent Brigade. From 1920 to 1923, Deng participated in battles in Yunnan, Guizhou and Sichuan and was appointed commander of the 3rd Division. On December 10, 1923, the Beiyang government established by the Zhili clique promoted Deng to the rank of general. In May 1924 he was appointed Governor of Sichuan.

In 1926, Deng joined his forces to the National Revolutionary Army under Chiang Kai-shek, and he was designated commander of the 28th Army and Military Governor of Sichuan from 1926 to 1927. He was sent to command the 45th Army in 1927, while acting as director of the Sichuan Provincial Financial Bureau. In 1928 he became the commanding general of the 14th Route Army.

When the Second Sino-Japanese War began in 1937, Deng became the general commanding the 4th Corps and then the 45th Corps, seeing action at the Battle of Xuzhou in 1938. Then he was made Commander in Chief of the 22nd Army Group, composed of Sichuan divisions that fought the Japanese in the Battle of Taierzhuang. His force defended Lincheng, and Dengxian, north of Taierzhuang.

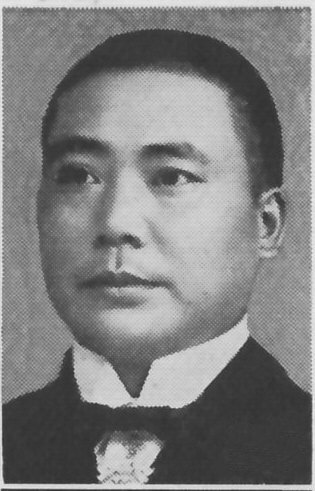
Deng Xihou as pictured in The Most Recent Biographies of Chinese Dignitaries

From 1939 to 1945 he was the Military Affairs Commissioner for the Southwest.

During the Chinese Civil War, Deng Xihou was once again given the governorship of Sichuan, from 1947 to 1948. However, Deng, together with fellow Sichuan generals and warlords Liu Wenhui and Pan Wenhua, crossed over to the Communists in the Chengdu Uprising of December 1949 (they were in secret negotiations with Mao Zedong since the early summer of 1949). Chengdu was the last important city in mainland China to be captured by the Communists.

In the new People's Republic of China, Deng went on to serve as Vice Governor of Sichuan, member of the National Committee of the Chinese People's Political Consultative Conference, member of the Central Military Commission, member of the National People's Congress, and he was also elected to the Central Committee of the Revolutionary Committee of the Chinese Kuomintang (RCCK).

Deng Xihou died on March 30, 1964, in Chengdu, aged 74. One of his sons, Deng Yumin (born 1940) is a politician, having served as Vice Chairman of Chengdu Municipal People's Congress, and member of the Chinese People's Political Consultative Conference.

== See also ==
- Warlord Era
- Revolutionary Committee of the Chinese Kuomintang
