= Battle of Xuzhou order of battle =

The Battle of Xuzhou was fought in May 1938 as part of the Second Sino-Japanese War.

== Japan ==
The Japanese Order of battle

=== North China Front Army ===
Field Marshal Count Hisaichi Terauchi

- 16th Division - Lt. Gen. Keisuke Fujie
  - 19th Infantry Brigade
    - 9th Infantry Regiment
    - 20th Infantry Regiment
  - 30th Infantry Brigade
    - 33rd Infantry Regiment
    - 38th Infantry Regiment
  - 22nd Field Artillery Regiment
  - 20th Cavalry Regiment
  - 16th Engineer Regiment
  - 16th Transport Regiment
- 114th Division -Lt. Gen. Shigeji Suematsu
  - 127th Infantry Brigade
    - 66th Infantry Regiment
    - 115th Infantry Regiment
  - 128th Infantry Brigade
    - 102nd Infantry Regiment
    - 150th Infantry Regiment
  - 120th Field Artillery Regt
  - 118th Cavalry Regiment
  - 114th Engineer Regiment
  - 114th Transport Regiment
- 3rd Infantry Brigade / 2nd Division - Major Gen. Kazuo Isa [2]
  - 4th Infantry Regiment
  - 29th Infantry Regiment
- 13th Infantry Brigade / 7th Division - Major Gen. Tadao Yoshizawa [2]
  - 25th Infantry Regiment
  - 26th Infantry Regiment
- Imada Detachment- Colonel Imada
  - 2nd Tank Battalion - Colonel Imada
    - 36 Type 89 Medium Tanks
  - 1st Battalion/9th Infantry Regiment/16th Division
  - One mountain gun company
  - One engineer platoon
  - and other support units

=== 2nd Army ===
Gen. Toshizō Nishio

  - 5th Division - Gen. Seishirō Itagaki
    - 9th Infantry Brigade
      - 11th Infantry Regiment
      - 41st Infantry Regiment
    - 21st Infantry Brigade
      - 21st Infantry Regiment
      - 42nd Infantry Regiment
    - 5th Mountain Artillery Regiment
    - 5th Cavalry Regiment
    - 5th Engineer Regiment
    - 5th Transport Regiment
  - 10th Division - Lt. Gen. Yoshio Shinozuka
    - 8th Infantry Brigade
      - 39th Infantry Regiment
      - 40th Infantry Regiment
    - 33rd Infantry Brigade [Seya Detachment]
      - 10th Infantry Regiment
      - 63rd Infantry Regiment
    - 10th Field Artillery Regiment
    - 10th Cavalry Regiment
    - 10th Engineer Regiment
    - 10th Transport Regiment

=== Central China Expeditionary Force ===
Field Marshal Shunroku Hata

- 3rd Division- Gen. Lt. Gen. Susumu Fujita
  - 5th Infantry Brigade
    - 6th Infantry Regiment
    - 68th Infantry Regiment
  - 29th Infantry Brigade
    - 18th Infantry Regiment
    - 34th Infantry Regiment
  - 3rd Field Artillery Regiment
  - 3rd Cavalry Regiment
  - 3rd Engineer Regiment
  - 3rd Transport Regiment
- 5th Tank Battalion - Colonel Hosomi (attached to support 3rd Division)
  - 32 Type 89 Medium Tanks
  - 15 Type 94 Tankettes
- 9th Division - Lt. Gen. Ryousuke Yoshizumi
  - 6th Infantry Brigade
    - 7th Infantry Regiment
    - 35th Infantry Regiment
  - 18th Infantry Brigade
    - 19th Infantry Regiment
    - 36th Infantry Regiment
  - 9th Mountain Artillery Regiment
  - 9th Cavalry Regiment
  - 9th Engineer Regiment
  - 9th Transport Regiment
- 13th Division - Lt. Gen. Ryuhei Ogisu
  - 26th Infantry Brigade
    - 58th Infantry Regiment
    - 116th Infantry Regiment
  - 103rd Infantry Brigade
    - 65th Infantry Regiment
    - 104th Infantry Regiment(-)
  - 19th Mountain Artillery Regiment
  - 17th Cavalry Regiment
  - 13th Engineer Regiment
  - 13th Transport Regiment
- Iwanaka Detachment- Colonel Iwanaka
  - 1st Tank Battalion - Colonel Iwanaka
    - 24 Type 89 Medium Tanks, 8 Type 94 Tankettes
  - 17th Independent Tankette Company
  - 1st Battalion / 104th Infantry Regiment / 13th Division
  - One platoon of 19th Mountain Gun Regiment
  - Part of 1st Independent Engineer Company
  - One Independent Motorcar Company
  - Part of 13th Divisional Signal Unit

=== Air Forces ===
IJA Air Forces

North China

- Temporary Aviation Army Corps
  - 1st Hiko Daitai (Type 88 reconnaissance aircraft)
  - 2nd Hiko Daitai (Kawasaki Ki-10 fighter)
  - 5th Hiko Daitai (light bomber)
  - 6th Hiko Daitai (Type 93 twin engine bomber)
  - 7th Hiko Daitai (reconnaissance aircraft)
  - 9th Hiko Daitai (light bomber)
  - 3rd Independent squadron (large bomber)
  - 9th Independent squadron (Kawasaki Ki-10 fighter)
  - 1st Temporary independent squadron (Mitsubishi Ki-15)

Central China

- 3rd Flight Group
  - 1st independent squadron (reconnaissance aircraft)
  - 6th independent squadron (reconnaissance aircraft)
  - 10th independent squadron (Kawasaki Ki-10 fighters)
  - 8th Hiko Daitai (Ki-10 fighters)[4]

IJN Air Forces

- 12th Kōkūtai (predominantly fighter unit.)
  - Fighter daitai - Mitsubishi A5M
  - Attack daitai - Yokosuka B3Y1

Station: Daikojo (12/37 – 06/38), Anqing (06/38 – autumn/38)

- 13th Kōkūtai (predominantly land attack unit.)
  - Fighter daitai - Mitsubishi A5M
  - Attack daitai - Yokosuka B3Y1, Mitsubishi G3M (land attack unit.)

Station: Daikojo (12/37 – 03/38), Shanghai (04/38 – 11/40)

- 14th Kōkūtai
  - Fighter daitai - Mitsubishi A5M
  - Bomber daitai - ?
  - Attack daitai - ?

(Formed during April 1938.) Station: Sanqzao Island (04/38 – ?)

== China ==
=== Army ===
5th War Area - Li Zongren

- 2nd Group Army - Sun Lien-chung From 1st War area March 1938
  - 30th Army - Tien Chen-nan
    - 30th Division - Chang Cing-chao
    - 31st Division - Chih Feng-cheng
  - 42nd Army - Feng An-pang
    - 27th Division - Huang Chiao-sung
    - 44th Separate Brigade - Wu Peng-chu
- 3rd Group Army - Sun Tung-hsuen (acting)
  - 12th Army - Sun Tung-hsuen
    - 20th Division - Sun Tung-hsuen
    - 81st Division - Chan Shu-tang
  - 55th Army - Tsao Fu-lin
    - 29th Division - Tsao Fu-lin (concurrent)
    - 74th Division - Li Han-chang
  - 56th Army - Ku Liang-min
    - 22nd Division - Ku Liang-min (concurrent)
    - Pistol Brigade (28th Brigade) - Wu Hua-wen
- 11th Group Army - Li Pin-hsien
  - 31st Army - Wei Yung San
    - 131st Division - Chin Lien-fang
    - 135th Division - Su Tzu-hsing
    - 138th Division - Mo Teh-hung
- 21st Group Army - Liao Lei
  - 7th Army - Chou Tsu-huang
    - 170th Division - Hsu Chi-ming
    - 171st Division - Yang Fu-chang
    - 172nd Division - Cheng Shu-feng
  - 48th Army - Liao Lei (concurrent)
    - 173rd Division - Ho Wei-chen
    - 174th Division - Wang Tsan-pin
    - 176th Division - Ou Shou-nien
- 22nd Group Army - Teng His-hou, (Sun Cheng - acting) [from Szechuan]
  - 41st Army - Sun Cheng
    - 122nd Division - Wang Ming-chang
    - 124th Division - Wang Shih-chun
  - 45th Army - Chen Ting-hsun
    - 125th Division - Chen Ting-hsun (concurrent)
    - 127th Division - Chen Li
- 24th Group Army - Han The-chin (acting)
  - 57th Army - Miao Chen-liu
    - 111th Division - Chang En-tuo
    - 112th Division - Hou Shou-yi
  - 89th Army - Han Teh-chin (concurrent)
    - 33rd Division - Han Teh-chin (concurrent)
    - 117th Division - Li Shou-wei[6]
    - attached Kiangsu Peace Preservation Units
- 26th Group Army - Hsu Yuan-chuan (concurrent)
  - 10th Army - Hsu Yuan-chuan (concurrent)
    - 41st Division - Ting Chih-pan
    - 48th Division - Hsu Chi-wu
  - 87th Army - Liu Ying-ku
    - 199th Division - Lo Shu-chia
- 27th Group Army - Yang Sen
  - 20th Army - Yang Sen (concurrent)
    - 133rd Division - Yang Han-yu
    - 134th Division - Yang Han-chung
- 3rd Corps - Pang Bingxun
  - 40th Army - Pang Bingxun (concurrent)
    - 39th Division - Ma Fa-wu
- 19th Corps - Feng Chi-an
  - 77th Army - Feng Chi-an (concurrent)
    - 37th Division - Chia Chien-hsi
    - 179th Division - Ho Chi-feng
    - 132nd Division - Wang Chang-hai
- 20th Corps - Tang Enbo
  - 52nd Army - Kuan Lin-cheng
    - 2nd Division - Cheng Tung-kuo[r]
    - 25th Division - Chang Yao-ming[r]
  - 85th Army - Wang Chung-lien
    - 4th Division - Chen Ta-ching[r]
    - 89th Division - Division - Hsueh-chung
  - 110th Division - Chang Chen
  - 139th Division - Huang Kuang-hua
- 27th Corps - Chang Tse-chung
  - 59th Army - Chang Tse-chung (concurrent) [From 1st War area Jan. 1938]
    - 38th Division - Huang Wei-kang
    - 180th Division - Liu Chen-san
    - 9th Cavalry Division - Chang Teh-shun
    - 13th Cav. Brigade - Yao Ching-chuan
- 2nd Army - Li Yen-nien
  - 3rd Division - Li Yu-tang
  - 9th Division - Li Yen-nien (concurrent)
- 22nd Army - Tan Tao-yuan
  - 50th Division - Chen Kuang-yu
- 46th Army - Fan Sung-pu
  - 28th Division - Tung Chao
  - 49th Division - Chou Shih-mein
  - 92nd Division - Huang Kuo-liang
- 51st Army - Yu Hsueh-chung
  - 113th Division - Chao Kuang-lieh
  - 114th Division - Mu Chung-heng
- 60th Army - Lu Han
  - 182nd Division - An En-fu
  - 183rd Division - Kao Kyin-huai
  - 184th Division - Chang Chung
- 68th Army - Liu Ju-ming
  - 119th Division - Li Chin-tien
  - 143rd Division - Li Tseng-chih
- 69th Army - Shih Yu-san
  - 181st Division - Shih Yu-san (concurrent)
  - New 6th Division - Kao Shu-hsun
- 75th Army - Shih Yu-san
  - 6th Division - Shih Yu-san (concurrent)
  - 93rd Division - Kan Li-chu
- 92nd Army - Li Hsien-chou
  - 13th Division - Wu Liang-shen
  - 21st Division - Li Hsien-chou (concurrent)
- 95th Division - Lo Chi
- 140th Division - Wang Wen-yen
- 1st Regt. 1st Arty. Bde.
- 4th, 5th, 6th, and 7th Art. Regt.

=== Airforce ===
1st Air Route Command (ARC)

- Headquarters at Nanchang
  - 4th Pursuit Group based at Hankou - Mao Ying-Chu
    - 21st Pursuit Squadron - Captain Teng Ming-Teh
    - 22nd Pursuit Squadron - Zhang Wei-Hua
      - Curtiss Hawk III
    - 23rd Pursuit Squadron - Liu Chung-Wu
      - Polikarpov I-15bis
    - 24th Pursuit Squadron - Zhang Zhun
      - Curtiss Hawk III

3rd Air Route Command

- Headquarters at Sian
  - 17th Pursuit Squadron
    - I-15bis based at Sian
  - 25th Pursuit Squadron
    - I-15bis based at Sian
  - 3rd Pursuit Group - Lt. Colonel Wu Yu-Liu
    - based at Hsaio Kan
    - 7th Pursuit Squadron - Xiang Yung
      - I-15bis
    - 8th Pursuit Squadron -
      - I-15bis
