= Tianjin–Pukou Railway Operation order of battle =

Order of battle Tianjin–Pukou Railway Operation

== Japan ==
- 2nd Army – General Toshizō Nishio ( left early Oct. 37),[1] [6]
  - 10th Division (Motorized Square Division)– Gen Rensuke Isogai [6][7] arrived early September) **
    - 8th Infantry Brigade
      - 39th Infantry Regiment
      - 40th Infantry Regiment
    - 33rd Infantry Brigade
      - 10th Infantry Regiment
      - 63rd Infantry Regiment
    - 10th Field Artillery Regiment
    - 10th Cavalry Regiment
    - 10th Engineer Regiment
    - 10th Transport Regiment
  - 16th Division – Lt. Gen. Kesago Nakajima, 中島今朝吾[6][7]
    - 19th Infantry Brigade
      - 9th Infantry Regiment
      - 20th Infantry Regiment
    - 30th Infantry Brigade
      - 33rd Infantry Regiment
      - 38th Infantry Regiment
    - 22nd Field Artillery Regiment
    - 20th Cavalry Regiment
    - 16th Engineer Regiment
    - 16th Transport Regiment
  - 109th Division Maj-General Yamaoka Shigeatsu, 山岡重厚 [7]
    - 31st Infantry Brigade
      - 69th Infantry Regiment
      - 107th Infantry Regiment
    - 118th Infantry Brigade
      - 119th Infantry Regiment
      - 136th Infantry Regiment
    - 109th Mountain Artillery Regt
    - 109th Cavalry Regiment
    - 109th Engineer Regiment
    - 109th Transport Regiment

Notes

- 16th and 109th Divisions left campaign in early Oct. 37 to go to Ningchin to participate in the Peiking – Hankow Railway Operation. 16h Division was sent to join the Battle of Shanghai.
- 10th Division remained to conduct operations after the main force of 2nd Army left in Oct. 37.

Sources: [1] Hsu Long-hsuen and Chang Ming-kai, History of The Sino-Japanese War (1937–1945) 2nd Ed.,1971. Translated by Wen Ha-hsiung, Chung Wu Publishing; 33, 140th Lane, Tung-hwa Street, Taipei, Taiwan Republic of China. Pg 191–195 Map 5

[2] Sino-Japanese Air War 1937-45

[4] Madej, W. Victor, Japanese Armed Forces Order of Battle, 1937-1945 [2 vols], Allentown, Pennsylvania: 1981

[6] Generals from Japan

[7] 陸軍師団長一覧 (Generals of Division )

== China ==
Order of Battle Tianjin–Pukou Railway Operation (Early September 1937)[1]

1st Army Group – Gen. Sung Che-yuan

- 19th Army - Feng Chih-an
  - 77th Corps - Feng Chih-an(concurrent)
    - 37th Division – Chang Ling-yun
    - 132nd Division – Wang Chang-hai
    - 179th Division – Ho Chi-feng *
  - 59th Corps - Chang Tse-chung
    - 38th Division – Huang Wei-kang
    - 180th Division – Liu Tse-chen, *
  - 181st Division – Shih Yu-san, *
- 3rd Army - Pang Ping-hsun
  - 40th Corps - Pang Ping-hsun (concurrent)
    - 39th Division - Pang Ping-hsun (concurrent)
  - 49th Corps - Liu Tuo-chuan
    - 105th Division - Kao Peng-yun
    - 109th Division - Chao Yi
- 3rd Cavalry Corps - Cheng Ta-chang
  - 4th Cavalry Division - Wang Chi-feng
  - 9th Cavalry Division - Cheng Ta-chang (concurrent)
- 67th Corps - Wu Ke-jen
  - 107th Division - Chih Kuei-pi
  - 108th Division - Chan Wen-Chingi
- 23rd Division
- 12th Corps - Sun Tung-hsuan
  - 20th Division - Sun Tung-hsuan (concurrent)
  - 81st Division - Chan Shu-tang

Notes:

- [r]Reorganized Divisions [3]
- * 179th, 180th and 181st Divisions were formed from Peace Preservation Brigades and subordinate regiments of the 29th Army. [1]

Airforce - [2]

- None

Sources:

- [1] Hsu Long-hsuen and Chang Ming-kai, History of The Sino-Japanese War (1937–1945) 2nd Ed.,1971. Translated by Wen Ha-hsiung, Chung Wu Publishing; 33, 140th Lane, Tung-hwa Street, Taipei, Taiwan Republic of China. Pg 191–195, Map 5.
- [2] Sino-Japanese Air War 1937-45
- [3] History of the Frontal War Zone in the Sino-Japanese War, published by Nanjing University Press.

Besides the eight German trained Reorganized Divisions were 12 other Reorganized Divisions with Chinese arms on the reorganized model with two German advisors:

2nd, 4th, 10th, 11th, 25th, 27th, 57th, 67th, 80th, 83rd, 89th Division

These were to be trained by large teams of German advisors like the earlier eight divisions but the start of the war with Japan precluded that.
