= Battle of Xuzhou =

1938 battle between Japan and China

Coordinates: 34.2667°N 117.1670°E

- Part of the Second Sino-Japanese War and the interwar period
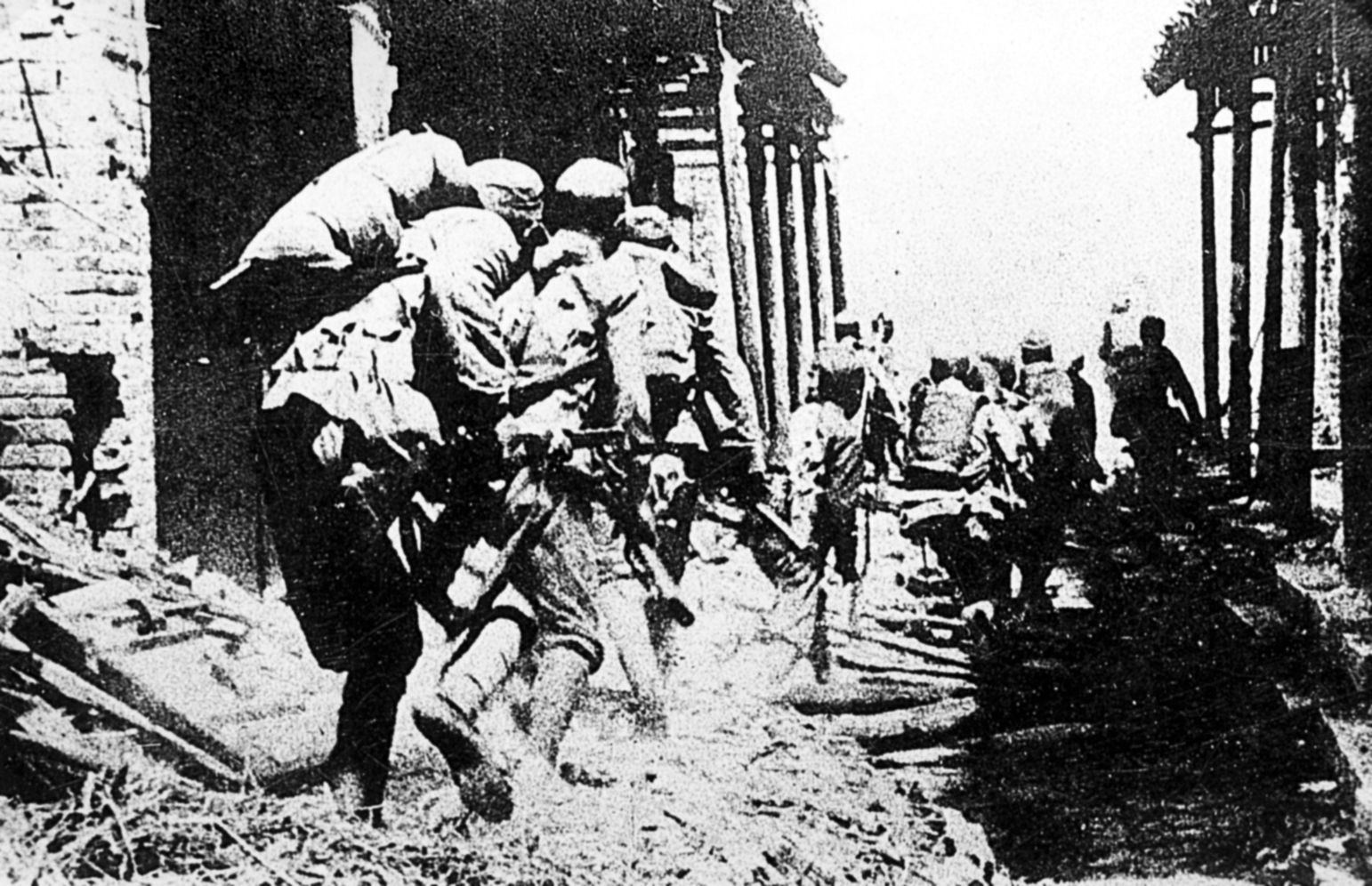
- Chinese troops fighting in the town of Taierzhuang
Date	February 9 – May 21, 1938 (3 months, 1 week and 5 days)
Location	Xuzhou city and proximity in Jiangsu province, Republic of China
Result	Japanese victory

Belligerents
(Republic of China (1912–1949)) China	(Empire of Japan) Japan

Commanders and leaders
(Republic of China (1912–1949)) Li Zongren (Republic of China (1912–1949)) Bai Chongxi (Republic of China (1912–1949)) Pang Bingxun (Republic of China (1912–1949)) Sun Lianzhong (Republic of China (1912–1949)) Sun Zhen (Republic of China (1912–1949)) Tang Enbo (Republic of China (1912–1949)) Wang Mingzhang † (Republic of China (1912–1949)) Zhang Zizhong	(Empire of Japan) Shunroku Hata (Empire of Japan) Hisaichi Terauchi (Empire of Japan) Toshizō Nishio (Empire of Japan) Isogai Rensuke (Empire of Japan) Itagaki Seishiro

Units involved
Military Region 1 Military Region 5	North China Area Army; Central China Expeditionary Army

Strength
35,578 officers and 571,396 soldiers in 64 divisions	400,000 troops

Casualties and losses
Western estimate: 60,000+ killed, missing, and deserted Chinese records: According to the Fifth War Zone : 219,678 killed, wounded, or missing: 2,515 officers and 82,809 soldiers killed; 5,252 officers and 101,134 soldiers wounded; 1,367 officers and 26,601 soldiers missing; According to the Ministry of Military Affairs : approximately 300,000 casualties: 1,352 officers and 103,638 soldiers killed; 2,702 officers and 207,395 soldiers wounded; Japanese Claim: 240,000 casualties, including 103,000 killed	Western estimate: 20,000+ killed in action Japanese claim (Second Army of the North China Area Army only) : Initial announcement : 2,130 killed, 8,586 wounded According to statistical table of the IJA 5th and 10th divisions compiled in mid-May 1938 : 2,369 killed, 9,615 wounded According to statistical table compiled by the IJA Second Army in mid-July 1938 : 3,171 killed, 10,937 wounded According to official Japanese newspaper : 4,300 killed

The Battle of Xuzhou was a military campaign between the Empire of Japan and the Republic of China forces in early 1938 during the Second Sino-Japanese War. It lasted for more than three months, with both sides taking heavy casualties and claiming victories. It resulted in an eventual victory for the Japanese, but they failed to destroy the Chinese army, who managed to retreat and regroup to fight later at Wuhan.

The battle of Xuzhou was primarily fought over control over the regional railway lines and junctions. The majority of the campaign took place in regions and cities north, east and south of Xuzhou, and was characterized by seesaw battles and bloody stalemates. It ended when the Japanese initiated a massive pincer movement aimed at encircling the Chinese forces. However, the Chinese managed to evade the Japanese maneuvers and break out of the encirclement, regrouping later to fight at Wuhan.

The campaign also saw the first major Chinese victory of the war at Taierzhuang, where warlord armies under the command of Li Zongren and Tang Enbo managed to defeat Japanese forces in fierce close quarters urban warfare. The campaign also served as a morale boost for the Chinese army and population, who approached the following defense of Wuhan with renewed confidence and determination.

== Background ==
In 1937 the Japanese North China Area Army had chased Song Zheyuan's 29th Army to the south along the Jinpu Railway (see Tianjin–Pukou Railway Operation) after his defeat in the Battle of Lugou Bridge.

Following the Japanese victory in the Battle of Nanjing, the North China Area Army aimed to advance southward and establish a connection with the Eleventh Army between Beijing and Nanjing. The two armies were to march along the northern and southern ends of the JinPu railway, meet up in Xuzhou, and from there coordinate a pincer movement into the Chinese strongholds in the Central Yangtze valley, taking Jiujiang first and then Wuhan.

The Chinese leadership recognized the strategic importance of defending Xuzhou, as it was both the midpoint of the JinPu line and the intersection with the Longhai line (China's main cross-country rail that ran from Lanzhou to Lianyungang), which if seized, would give the Japanese mobility over north–south travel in central China. In the end of January, Chiang summoned a military conference in Wuchang in which he declared the defense of Xuzhou to be the top strategic priority. Chinese preparations saw an initial core of 80,000 troops swell to 300,000, who were positioned along the JinPu and Longhai rail lines to draw in and overextend the Japanese attacks. This was in line with Baoding military academic Jiang Baili's grand strategy of "protracted warfare," where China was to wear down Japan over the long term. Many of Jiang's students were commanders of the Chinese defense, including Chen Cheng, Bai Chongxi, Tang Shengzhi, and Xue Yue.

Most mechanized and air forces in eastern China were wiped out in the Battle of Shanghai, which concluded in late November 1937. Although new equipment was purchased, it had yet to be shipped. Han Fuqu, the chairman of the Shandong province, rejected orders from Chiang Kai-shek and kept retreating to preserve his force. After Qingdao was occupied in January 1938, Han's policy was denounced and he was executed on 24 January. In March 1938 Japanese forces occupied the north of Shandong, including the capital city Jinan. The defense line along the Yellow River was torn apart. Due to pressure from Japanese forces, 64 Chinese divisions gathered around Xuzhou in Jiangsu, the headquarters of 5th Military Region of the National Revolutionary Army.

== Course of the Xuzhou Campaign ==
=== First phase (Early February - Late March) ===
The battle of Xuzhou began in early February when Japanese armored units with strong air support attacked the Chinese divisions protecting the JinPu railway, about 100 miles north and south of Xuzhou. On February 9, the Japanese seized the city of Bengbu, granting them control of areas north of the Huai River 400 km northeast of Wuhan. From February 5 until February 20, the 51st corps of the Northeastern Army and Zhang Zizhong's 59th corps of the Northwestern Army fought the Japanese 13th division at the eastern bank of the Huai River. At the same time, the 7th and 31st corps of the Guangxi Army attacked the division's flank at Dingyuan County to assist in the consolidating of positions along the Huai River.

In mid-February, the 3rd army group of the Shandong Army and the 22nd army group of the Sichuan Army simultaneously launched an offensive at the northern section of the Jinpu line, intending to recapture Wenshang, Jining, and Liangxiadian (兩下店). They were resisted tenaciously by the Japanese 10th division and after a week of fighting the division counterattacked the Shandong Army until it occupied Jiaxiang County on February 25.

However, the Japanese advance was stalled by a large Chinese force near the Teng xian railway stop (today Tengzhou), some 75 miles north of Xuzhou. Defending the Teng xian were poorly armed and inexperienced units from Sichuan commanded by General Wang Mingzhang. However, the Sichuanese managed to hold their positions until mid-March, when they were finally overwhelmed by heavy artillery barrages and the sheer size of the Japanese force. General Wang was killed directly in the fighting.

The Chinese stood their ground along the eastern end of the Longhai railway near the port of Lianyungang. At Yixian and Haiyuan, both sides frequently fought to the death: neither side could drive the other back in a bloody stalemate.

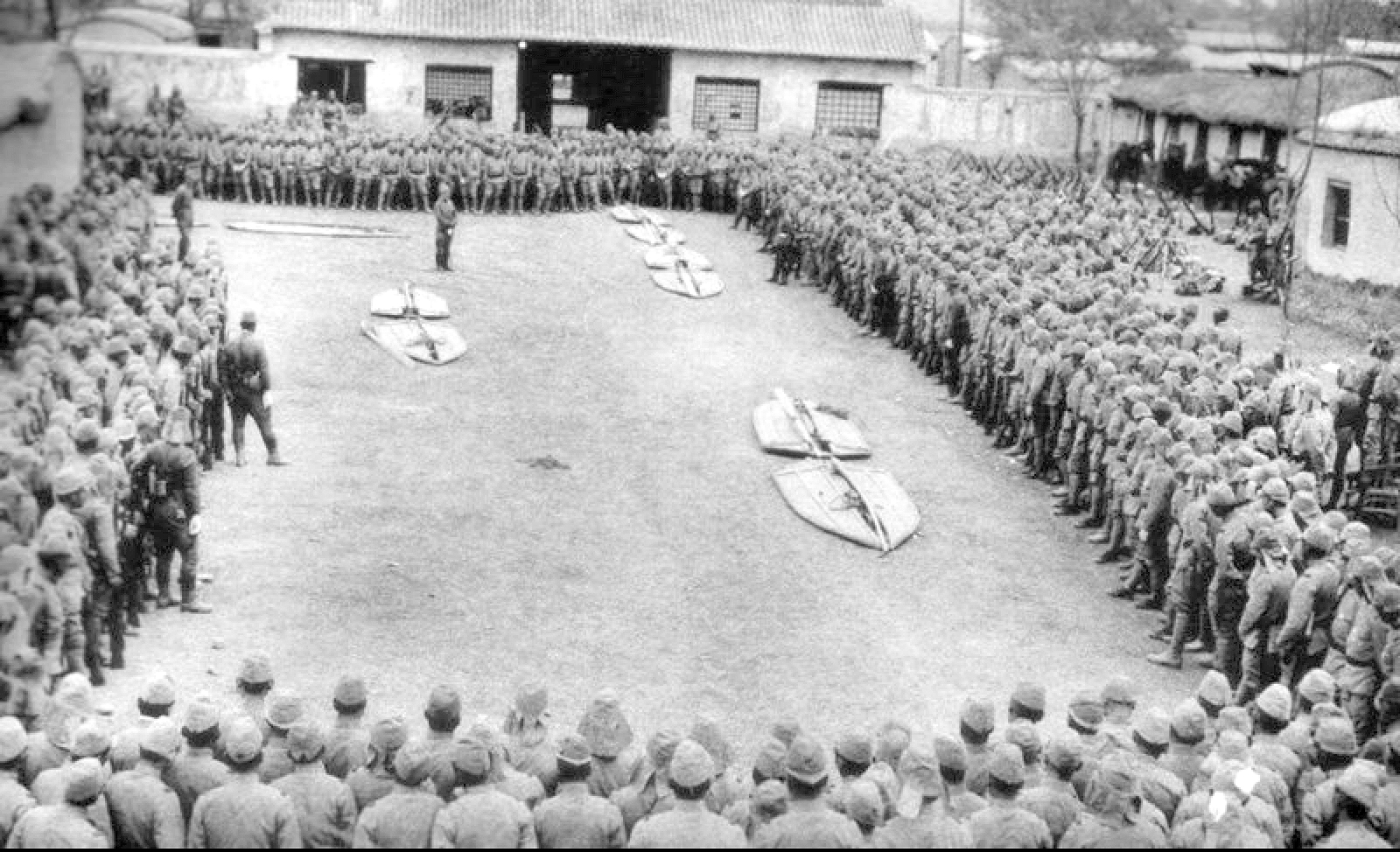
Japanese soldiers preparing for an amphibious attack

The Japanese were stopped again at Linyi by entrenched Chinese forces under the command of Generals Pang Bingxun and Zhang Zizhong. What followed was a three-week battle, where the Chinese defenders managed to fight the Japanese to a halt despite heavy losses.

=== Second phase (Late March - Early April) ===
Despite the fierce resistance of the Chinese army, the Japanese forces were coming close to linking their forces together in Xuzhou by late March. To counter this, the Chinese committed to confronting the Japanese in the traditional stone-walled city of Taierzhuang.

==== Battle of Taierzhuang ====
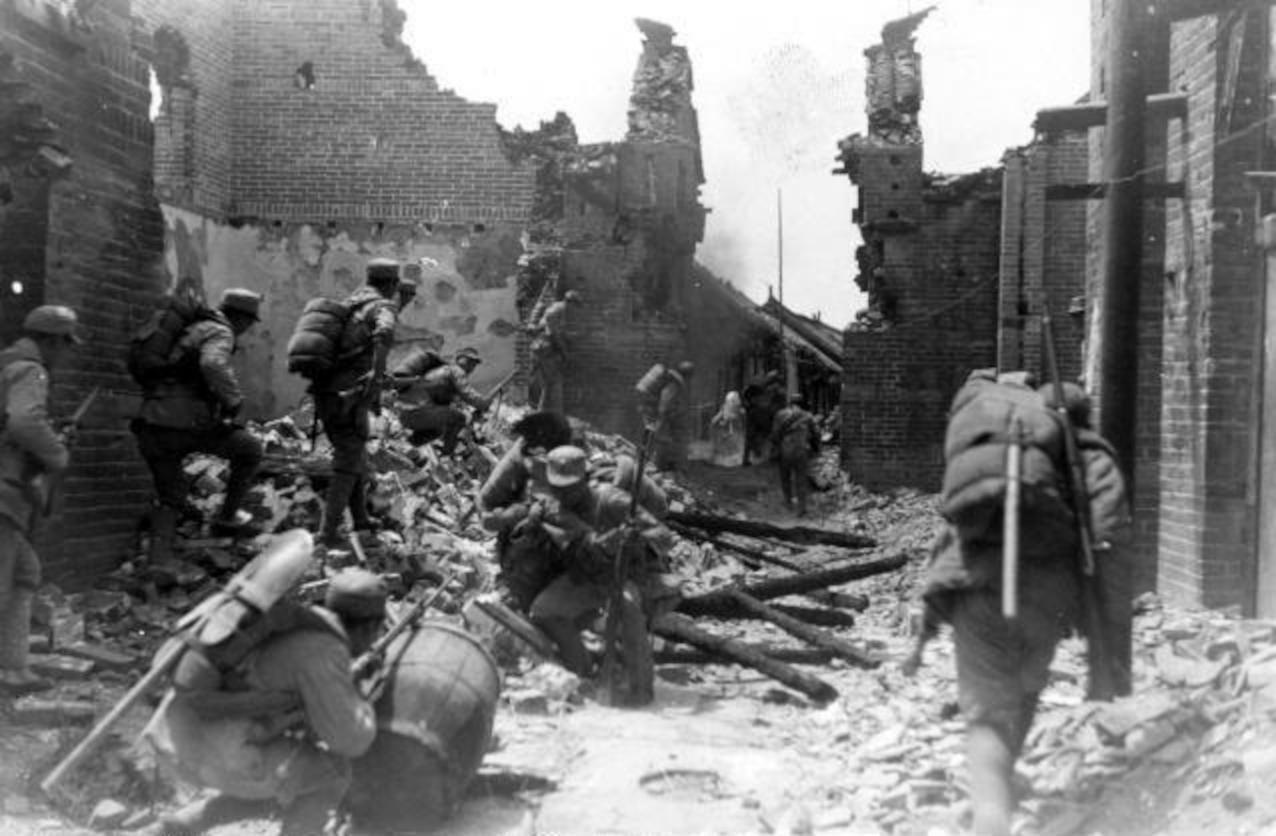
Chinese soldiers fighting house to house in Taierzhuang

Taierzhuang was strategically significant, as it lay along the Grand Canal and was an intersection between the Jinpu and Longhai lines. In a telegram on April 1, Chiang Kai-Shek ordered to his generals that "the enemy at Taerzhuang must be destroyed."

Three Japanese divisions under Gen. Itagaki Seishiro moved south to attack Taierzhuang, and were confronted by forces under the command of Li Zongren, Sun Lianzhong and Tang Enbo, whose units possessed artillery.

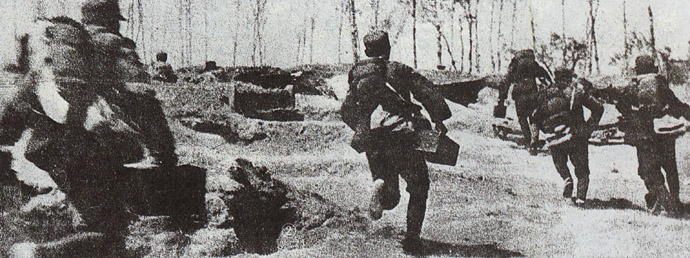
Chinese troops fighting in Taierzhuang

In a two-week battle between March 22 and April 7, "very similar to the costly urban battles that Europe was soon to see," Chinese and Japanese forces engaged in fighting vicious even by the standards of the war, often in close quarters and at nighttime. The cramped conditions of the urban fighting also enabled the Chinese to overcome Japanese advantages in armor and artillery, enabling them to fight on equal terms. The Chinese also managed to resupply their own troops and sever the Japanese supply lines from the rear, bleeding the Japanese dry of ammunition, supplies and reinforcements.

By April 7, the Japanese were forced into a retreat in the first Chinese victory of the war. Both sides had suffered heavy losses, with some 20,000 men lost on both sides.

=== Third phase (Mid April - Mid May) ===
By late April, the Chinese army still had between 450,000 and 600,000 troops in the Xuzhou area, but these armies were afflicted by issues in command and control. The split nature of the Chinese military, divided amongst warlord lines and mutual distrust, prevented logistics and army coordination from operating efficiently.

Following their defeat at Taierzhuang, the Japanese assembled some 400,000 troops in the Xuzhou area, intent on encircling the Chinese forces in Xuzhou. The North China Area Army had four divisions and two infantry brigades drawn from the Kwantung Army, while the Central China Expeditionary Army had three divisions and the 1st and 2nd Tank Battalions with motorized support units. The 5th Tank Battalion was used to support the 3rd Infantry Division advancing north along the railway to Xuzhou.

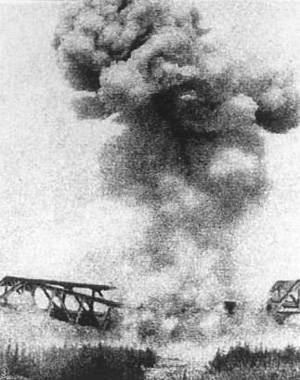
Japanese artillery hitting a part of the Longhai railway

The fighting in the west, east and north of Xuzhou was bloody, with heavy casualties on both sides. On April 18, the Japanese army advanced southward towards Pizhou. Tang Enbo's 20th army corps along with the 2nd, 22nd, 46th, and 59th corps resisted fiercely, resulting in a stalemate by the end of April. The 60th corps of the Yunnan Army fought against the Japanese 10th division at Yuwang Mountain (禹王山) for close to a month, resisting multiple attacks. By the time it handed over its position to the Guizhou 140th division and withdrew on May 15, the corps had lost more than half of its troops. The Japanese army also launched attacks at the north and south side of the Huai River and the Chinese defenders resisting tenaciously for several weeks. However, the Japanese slowly managed to prevail through artillery and aerial bombardment, and captured Mengcheng on May 9, and Hefei followed soon after on the 14th. From there, the southern flank force split into the Iwanaka and Imada detachments, which were ordered to advance west of Xuzhou to cut off the Chinese escape route and advance north up to the Suxian, respectively. At the north side of the Huai River, the 21st army group, 77th corps, and 68th corps launched a counterattack to support the troops at the south side, but was eventually called off with the decision to abandon Xuzhou. Additional troops were deployed in the Battle of Northern and Eastern Henan to stop Chinese reinforcements from the west. A Chinese counterattack here resulted in the Battle of Lanfeng.

As a result, the Japanese managed to cut off Chinese access to the Long-Hai railway, and landed troops at Lianyungang in an amphibious assault. This put the Chinese forces in a critical situation, who were on the verge of being completely surrounded. Realizing the danger of the situation, Chiang Kai-shek authorized a withdrawal.

== Breakout of the Chinese Army ==
On May 15, Li Zongren, along with Bai Chongxi and Tang Enbo, began evacuating Xuzhou's military and civilian population. Li ordered his troops to melt away into the countryside and then move south and west at night, cross the JinPu Railway and split into four groups that would regroup west in the Dabeishan Mountains for the defense of Wuhan.

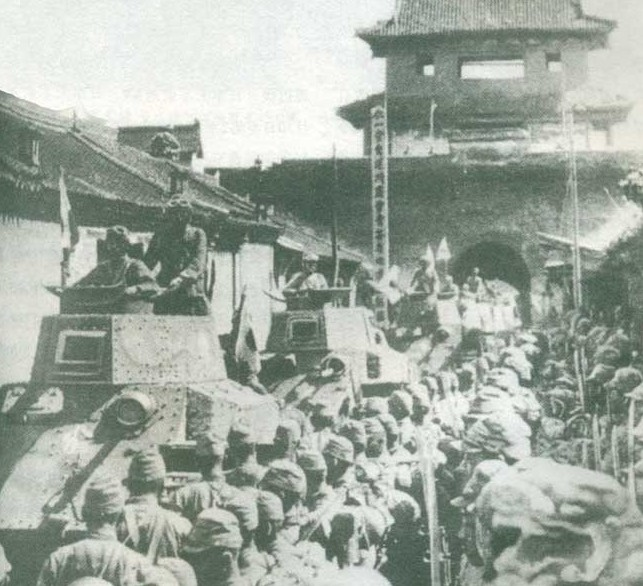
Japanese troops entering Xuzhou

In what was described as "one of the war's most skillful maneuvers," the Chinese managed to extricate some 200,000-300,000 troops in 40 divisions from the Japanese encirclement, moving quickly at night and hiding in wheat fields by day. In addition, a fortuitous sandstorm and fog on May 18 covered the tracks of the retreating Chinese soldiers. On the same day, Xiao County fell, and the defending 139th division was nearly wiped out. The withdrawal was completed by May 21, and the Chinese were able to preserve the majority of their forces. These units would form approximately 50% of the Chinese forces participating in the Defense of Wuhan.

The Japanese would march into Xuzhou on May 19, nearly abandoned by that point, and capture some 30,000 Chinese soldiers and civilians left in the city.

== Breaching of the Yellow River ==
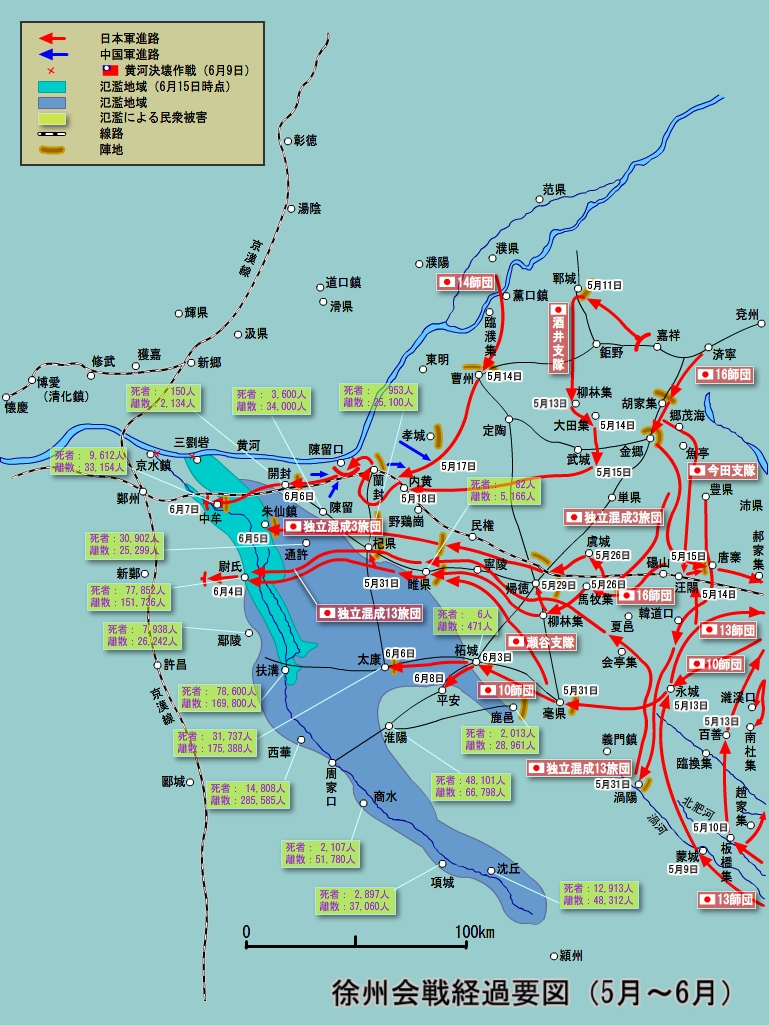
Map of the military situation outside Xuzhou, May–June 1938

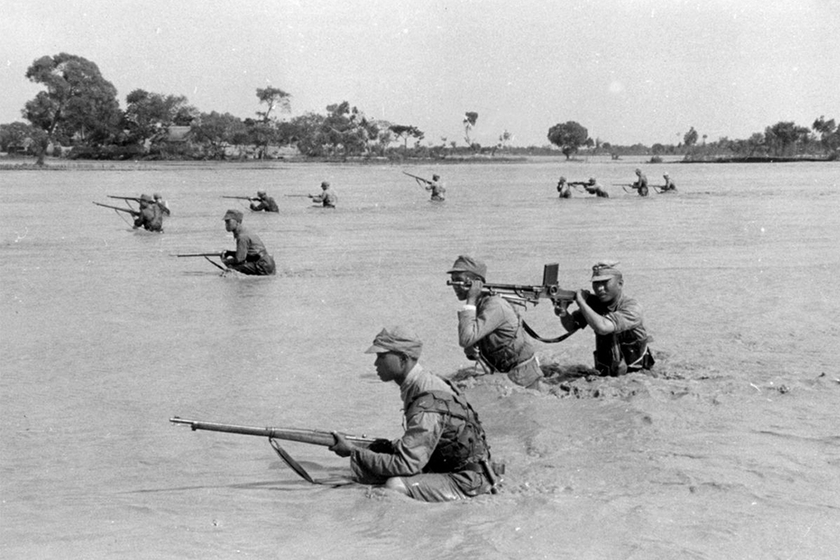
Chinese soldiers in a flooded area

Despite the successful breakout, the Chinese were faced with the prospect of losing Wuhan to the Japanese, who were advancing rapidly along the captured railway lines to only 40 km from Zhengzhou by May 1938. In desperation, the Chinese authorized the destruction of the river dikes in central Henan to forcibly halt the Japanese advance. The demolition of the dykes holding back the Yellow River bought more time for the preparation of the defense of Wuhan, but the resulting 1938 Yellow River flood also destroyed much of the area around the new course of the river and claimed appalling losses among Chinese civilians: est. 400,000–500,000 dead and 3 million refugees.

== Aftermath ==
The fall of Xuzhou marked a blow to Chiang's attempt to hold central China and his ability to transport troops through the region. However, the resistance of the Chinese forces, especially the victory of Taierzhuang, had built up the morale of the Chinese population.

Both sides had suffered massive casualties as a result of the campaign. In the battle of Taierzhuang alone, both sides lost at least 20,000 men each in a two-week period. The city of Taierzhuang had also been almost completely destroyed by the brutal urban fighting it had experienced.

The city of Xuzhou itself was utterly devastated by the fighting. Having experienced Japanese bombardment since August 1937, many of the city's buildings and bridges had been destroyed by both retreating Chinese and advancing Japanese troops. According to Canadian Jesuits who remained in the city after it fell, more than a third of the city's houses were destroyed, and most of the local population had fled in terror.

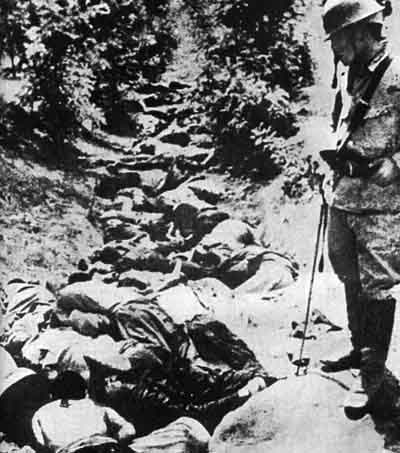
Chinese civilians massacred by the Japanese Army in a ditch, Xuzhou

As it had been in Nanjing, much of Xuzhou's civilian population was subject to atrocities by the Japanese Army. In all the rural areas around the city, there were repeated reports of massacres, with many of them witnessed by foreign missionaries. Some 700 civilians were killed in a single bombing raid on May 14. The local population was also frequently harassed by bandits, and suffered food shortages due to a breakdown in agricultural labor.

The Yellow River floods inundated some 54,000 square kilometers of central China, and resulted in anywhere between 3 million - 5 million refugees and some 500,000 dead of epidemics and famine up to 1943. The strategic value of the floods, and whether they were necessary in the first place, are still a matter of controversy amongst historians.

== See also ==
- Order of battle: Battle of Xuzhou
- Chinese order of battle, Battle of Xuzhou
- Huaihai Campaign
