= Battle of Northern Henan =

Conflict in 1929

Date	May 27, 1929
Location	northern Henan
Result	Chiang Kai-shek's Han Fuju led military attack failed anti Feng

Belligerents
National Revolutionary Army	Guominjun

Commanders and leaders
Han Fuju	Pang Bingxun

The northern Henan battle took place on May 27, 1929, and the location was in northern Henan, China. It was one of the civil war battles that took place inside the National Revolutionary Army. The two warring sides of the division were Han Fuju Army supported by Chiang Kaishek and Pang Bingxun Army supported by Feng Yuxiang. Han was a former subordinate of Feng while Pang had once been a commander of the Zhili clique's Wu Peifu before joining Feng.
