= Wang Mingzhang =

Chinese general

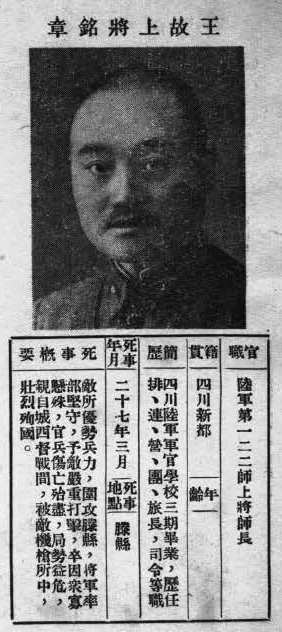
- Wang Mingzhang
- Born: 4 July 1893; Xindu County, Sichuan, Qing China (now Xindu District, Chengdu, Sichuan)
- Died: 17 March 1938 (aged 44) Teng County, Shandong, Republic of China (now Tengzhou, Shandong)
- Allegiance: Republic of China
- Branch: National Revolutionary Army
- Service years: 1909-1938
- Rank: General
- Conflicts: Second Revolution; Second Sino-Japanese War; Battle of Taierzhuang †

Wang Mingzhang (traditional Chinese: 王銘章; simplified Chinese: 王铭章; pinyin: Wáng Míngzhāng; Wade–Giles: Wang Ming-chang; 4 July 1893 – 14 March 1938), courtesy name Zhizhong (之鐘), was a Chinese general of the National Revolutionary Army during the Second Sino-Japanese War who was killed in action during the Battle of Taierzhuang.

== Biography ==
Born in Xindu County (modern-day Xindu District, Chengdu), Sichuan, Wang Mingzhang entered the Sichuan Army Elementary School in 1911 and the Army Middle School in Nanjing in 1912. Afterwards, he returned to Sichuan to enter the Sichuan Military Academy, and after he graduated in 1914 successively held the commands of a platoon, company, battalion, regiment, and brigade. He was involved in the various conflicts between the Sichuan clique warlords during the Warlord Era. In 1933 was appointed division commander. After the beginning of the Second Sino-Japanese War, as part 41st Corps/22nd Army Group, the 122nd Division left Sichuan in 1937 to attack the Japanese forces.

Wang Mingzhang commanded the 122nd Division in 1938 during the Xuzhou Campaign. His Division and 364th Brigade held out in the Teng County (today Tengzhou) against the Japanese in four days of heavy street fighting. He was killed in action on 17 March 1938, during the Battle of Taierzhuang.

In 1984, the Sichuan Provincial government confirmed him as a revolutionary martyr of the People's Republic of China.
