= Tianjin–Pukou Railway Operation =

1937 Second Sino-Japanese War operation

Tientsin–Pukow Railway Operation
- Part of the Second Sino-Japanese War and the interwar period
Date	August 21, 1937 – January 11, 1938 (4 months and 3 weeks)
Location	Tianjin–Pukou Railway, Republic of China
Result	Japanese victory

Belligerents
(Empire of Japan) Japan	(Republic of China (1912–1949)) China

Commanders and leaders
(Empire of Japan) Toshizō Nishio	(Republic of China (1912–1949)) Song Zheyuan

Units involved
Imperial Japanese Army: 10th division; 16th division; 109th division	National Revolutionary Army Ground Forces; 1st group army; 59th corps; 77th corps; 181st division; 3rd army corps; 40th corps; 49th corps; 23rd division; 3rd group army; 12th corps; 55th corps; 3rd cavalry corps; 67th corps; 29th corps

Casualties and losses
10th division : 4,034 casualties 16th division : 851 casualties Motokawa's brigade of the 109th division : 232 casualties Units directly under the Second Army : 189 casualties	37,700+ casualties

The Tientsin–Pukow Railway Operation (Japanese: 津浦線作戦; early August to mid November, 1937) was a follow-up operation to the Battle of Beiping-Tianjin of the Japanese army in North China at the beginning of the Second Sino-Japanese War, fought concurrently with the Beiping–Hankou Railway Operation. The Tientsin–Pukow Railway Operation was not authorized by Imperial General Headquarters. The Japanese advanced following the line of the Tianjin-Pukou Railway aiming to the Yangtze River without meeting much resistance. The Japanese advance stopped at Jinan 36.67°N 116.98°E on Yellow River after majority of the participating Japanese forces were redirected for the Battle of Taiyuan and replaced by parts of the newly formed 109th division.

== Aftermath ==
After the stalemate at Yellow River from November 1937 to March 1938, the fighting resumed resulting in Battle of Xuzhou.

== See also ==
- Order of Battle Tianjin–Pukou Railway Operation
