= Battle of Taierzhuang =

1938 battle of the Second Sino-Japanese War

Coordinates: 34°33′26″N 117°43′51″E

- Part of the Battle of Xuzhou in the Second Sino-Japanese War and the interwar period
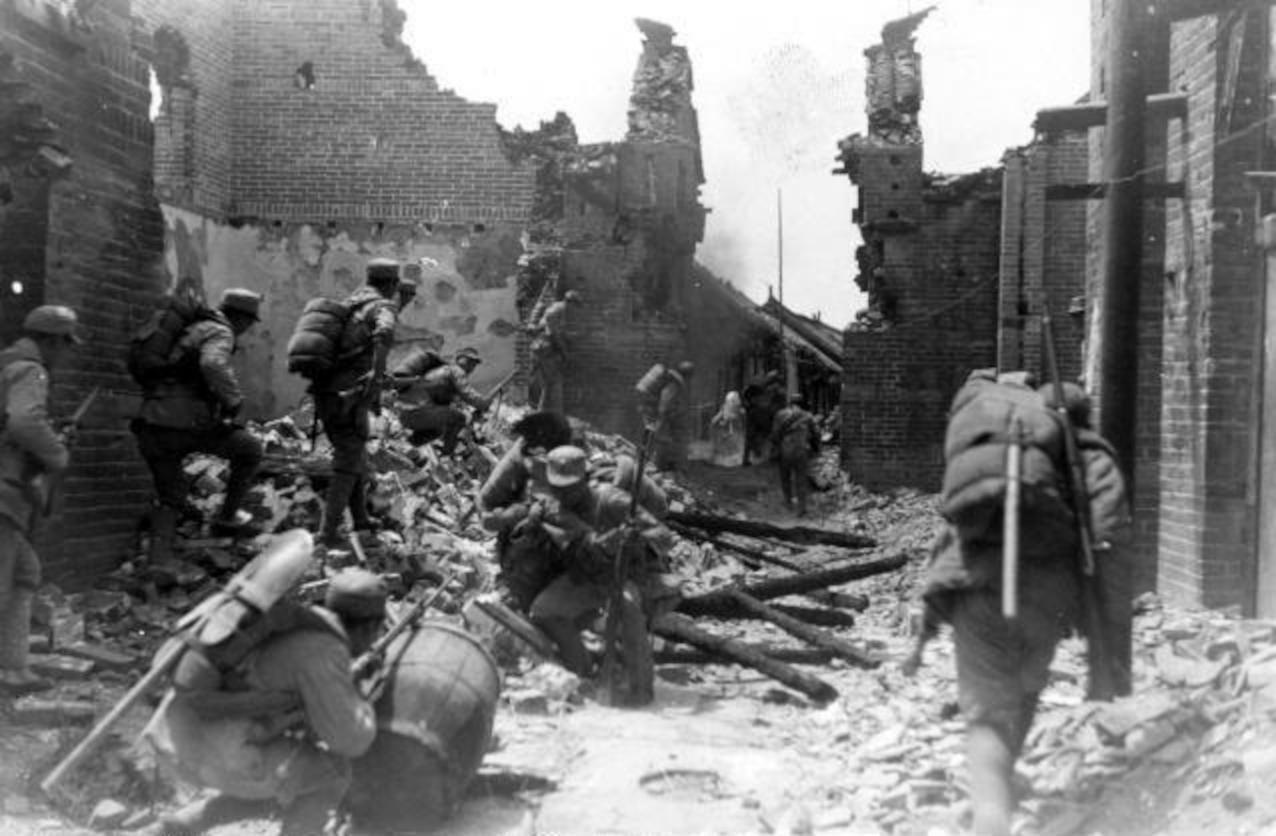
- House-to-house fighting in Tai'erzhuang
Date	22 March – 7 April 1938 (16 days)
Location	Tai'erzhuang in Shandong and Pizhou in Jiangsu, China
Result	Chinese victory

Belligerents
China	Japan

Commanders and leaders
(Taiwan) Li Zongren; (Taiwan) Bai Chongxi; (Taiwan) Tang Enbo; (Taiwan) Sun Lianzhong; (Taiwan) Deng Xihou; (Taiwan) Pang Bingxun; (Taiwan) Han Deqin; (Taiwan) Sun Zhen; (Taiwan) Zhang Zizhong; (Taiwan) Guan Linzheng	(Empire of Japan) Rensuke Isogai; (Empire of Japan) Seishirō Itagaki

Units involved
National Revolutionary Army: 3rd and 4th PG Squadrons, Nationalist Air Force of China	North China Area Army, 2nd Army: 10th Division Seya Task Force; 5th Division Sakamoto Task Force

Strength
100,000–288,000 troops in 10 divisions: 20th Corps and attached units: about 72,278 troops (Note: Totaling seven infantry divisions, one infantry brigade, one cavalry division, one cavalry regiment, and one artillery regiment)	17,000–60,000 troops 7 tanks 39 tankettes

Casualties and losses
Western claims: 20,000–30,000+ killed and wounded Chinese records: (Note: Including the battles of Tengxian, Lincheng, Hanzhuang, Yixian, Guoliji, and Taierzhuang from March 14 to April 7, 1938. Excluding the Linyi battlefield): 20th Corps: about 20,342 killed, wounded, or missing (Note: Including four infantry divisions, one cavalry division, one infantry brigade, and one artillery regiment temporarily assigned to the corps. Excluding the 110th Division of the corps temporarily assigned to the 2nd Group Army); 2nd Group Army: 9,675 killed, wounded, or missing; 22nd Group Army: 2,415 killed, wounded, or missing.	Modern Western estimate: 8,000 killed 12,000 wounded Contemporary Western estimates: 16,000–20,000 killed 40 tanks destroyed 70 armored cars 100+ trucks Japanese records: Seya Task Force: 411 killed 1,319 wounded 4 tanks 7 tankettes; Sakamoto Task Force: unknown; Under 2,500 total casualties Official Japanese newspaper claim: 636 combat deaths.: Seya Task Force: 448 combat deaths; Sakamoto Task Force: 188 combat deaths; Chinese claim: 20,000+ killed and wounded 10,000+ rifles 931 HMGs; 77 infantry guns 40 tanks 50+ cannons Countless POWs

The Battle of Taierzhuang (Chinese: 臺兒莊會戰; pinyin: Tái'érzhuāng Huìzhàn) took place during the Second Sino-Japanese War in 1938. It was fought between the armies of the Republic of China and the Empire of Japan at the peak of the Xuzhou Campaign. The battle was the war's first major Chinese victory. The battle was a setback for the Japanese military and its reputation as an invincible force. For Chinese forces, it was a tremendous morale boost.

The battle was characterized by vicious close quarters combat. The cramped conditions of urban warfare neutralized Japanese advantages in cannon and heavy artillery. In these circumstances, the Chinese were able to fight the Japanese as equals. Unlike previous engagements, the Chinese managed to resupply their troops while also preventing the Japanese from doing the same. After two weeks of heavy fighting, the Japanese were in short supply of men and material. The Japanese were then virtually encircled by a Chinese counterattack, and were forced out of Taierzhuang with heavy casualties.

Taierzhuang is located on the eastern bank of the Grand Canal of China and was a frontier garrison northeast of Xuzhou. It was also the terminus of a local branch railway from Lincheng. Xuzhou itself was the junction of the Jinpu railway (Tianjin-Pukou), the Longhai railway (Lanzhou-Lianyungang), and the headquarters of the KMT's 5th War Zone.

== Background ==
=== Political and strategic situation ===
By 1938, the Chinese military had suffered tremendous losses in the campaigns of Shanghai and Nanjing. In particular, its air force and navy had both been virtually wiped out. Nonetheless, China's resolve in resisting the Japanese invasion showed no signs of weakening. On 30 January, the Japanese military high command, after evaluating the situation in China, decided that no new offensive operations should be conducted until August. Emperor Hirohito's stance was even more conservative: he believed that it would take at least a year for the Japanese to solidify their positions in their newly captured territory and consolidate their strength before conducting any further operations. Thus, the Japanese high command decided to wait until 1939 before conducting a swift, aggressive offensive in order to decisively end the war in China.

At the same time, Chiang Kai-shek refused to accept the Japanese terms for surrender. On 20 February, China withdrew its ambassador Xu Shiying from Japan. The next day, Japan followed suit, withdrawing its ambassador Kawagoe Shigeru. Earlier that year, Chiang had also resigned from his post as Premier of the Executive Yuan, in order to fully dedicate his efforts to the war. The respective actions taken by both sides indicated their attitude towards the war: China was now fully committed, while Japan still showed some signs of hesitation.

=== Military situation ===
Despite Hirohito's declaration that no new offensives would be conducted in 1938, the Japanese forces in China were eager to continue their offensive, with morale reaching a peak following the Fall of Nanjing. The IJN's preferred strategy would have been to continue advancing westwards along the Yangtze River to invade Wuhan.

However, the IJA was reluctant to continue following this approach of following waterways, and instead pursued the Chinese army retreating from the Shanghai-Nanjing theatre, driving northwards into the three provinces of Jiangsu, Shandong and Henan.

A significant proportion of the Chinese forces that withdrew from Shanghai crossed the Yangtze River northwards into the Jiangbei region. During the retreat from Nanjing, many scattered Chinese troops also found themselves drifting down the Yangtze and into Jiangbei. The IJA saw this as an opportunity to pursue and destroy this cluster of disorganized Chinese troops, thus ignoring the IJN's strategy of following the Yangtze westwards.

Throughout December 1937, Rippei Ogisu's 13th Division pursued the fleeing Chinese forces, capturing Jiangdu, Shaobo, and advancing into Anhui to capture Tianchang. Simultaneously, in Northern China, Rensuke Isogai's 10th Division, advanced southwards between Qingcheng and Jiyang to cross the Yellow River, approaching the Jiaoji railway. Gaining access to the railway would enable it to move westwards then southwards to clear the Jinpu railway and join forces with the 13th division at Xuzhou. From there, the combined Japanese forces could attack Wuhan and force the KMT into surrender. The war had thus moved from the 3rd to the 5th War Area.

== Armies ==
=== Chinese ===
Chiang sent his Vice Chief of Staff Bai Chongxi to Xuzhou in January 1938. Li Zongren and Bai were old comrades from the New Guangxi Clique, and had served alongside each other since the Battle of Longtan in the Northern Expedition.

Chiang sent Li the 3rd War Area's 21st Group Army. Also a unit from Guangxi, the 21st was commanded by Liao Lei and consisted of the 7th and 48th Armies. At this time, Sun Zhen's 22nd Group Army, a unit from the Sichuan clique also arrived at the Shanxi-Henan region, only to be rejected by both Yan Xishan (commander of the 2nd War Area and chairman of Shanxi) and Cheng Qian (commander of the 1st War Area and chairman of Henan). Both Yan and Cheng disliked units from Sichuan for their poor discipline, particularly their rampant opium consumption.

Under the command of Sun Zhen, the 22nd Group Army had deployed four of its six divisions to assist the war effort in Northern China. Organized under the 41st and 45th Armies, the contingent began its foot march towards Taiyuan on 1 September, marching for more than 50 days continuously and covering some 1400 kilometers. When they arrived in Shanxi, they were confronted with an icy winter. Despite lacking winter uniforms or even a single map of the province, they immediately engaged the Japanese for 10 days at Yangquan (阳泉), incurring heavy casualties. Desperately low on supplies, they broke into one of the Shanxi clique's supply depots, infuriating Yan Xishan, who expelled them from the province. The 22nd then withdrew westwards into the 1st War Area, only for its commander, Cheng Qian to reject its request for resupplies.

=== Japanese ===
Southern	Commanded by Rippei Ogisu, the Japanese 13th Division, drove westwards from Nanjing via two columns in early February: the northern column advanced towards Mingguang (明光), while the southern column advanced towards Chuxian . Both columns were checked by Wei Yunsong's 31st Army, which had been tasked with defending the southern section of the Jinpu railway by Li Zongren. Despite facing a completely inferior enemy, the Japanese were unable to make any progress even after more than a month of continuous attacks. The Japanese then deployed armoured and artillery reinforcements from Nanjing. The Chinese responded by withdrawing westwards to the southwestern outskirts of Dingyuan in order to avoid direct confrontation with their reinforced foes. By this time, Yu Xuezhong's 51st Army had already positioned itself defensively on the northern banks of the Huai River, forming a defensive line between Bengbu and Huaiyuan. The Japanese proceeded to successively capture Mingguang, Dingyuan, and Bengbu before advancing towards Huaiyuan. However, their supply routes were then intercepted by the Chinese 31st Army, which conducted flanking attacks from the southwest. The Japanese situation was worsened further when the Chinese 7th Army (led by Liao Lei) then arrived at Hefei, reinforcing the 31st Army. Engaged by three Chinese armies simultaneously, the Japanese were trapped south of the Huai River and unable to advance any further despite enjoying complete air superiority and having a complete advantage in firepower. The Chinese had thus foiled the Japanese plan of advancing their 13th Division northwards along the Jinpu railway and joining forces with Isogai Division (10th Division) to launch a pincer attack on Xuzhou.
Northeastern	After amphibiously landing at Qingdao, the Japanese 5th Division (commanded by Seishiro Itagaki), advanced southwestwards along the Taiwei Highway, spearheaded by its 21st Infantry Brigade. There they faced the Chinese 3rd Group Army, commanded by Pang Bingxun. Despite being designated as a Group Army, Pang's unit only consisted of the 40th Army, which itself only consisted of the 39th Division, a unit from the Northwestern Army. Led by division commander Ma-Fawu, the 39th's five regiments ended up delaying the Japanese advance towards Linyi for over a month. The Japanese captured Ju County on 22 February and pushed towards Linyi on 3 March. However, they were met by a stiff Chinese counterattack, which checked them at the Taoyuan region. The Japanese then conducted heavy aerial bombardment on the single Chinese division, forcing it to withdraw into Linyi. During this time, Zhang Zizhong's 59th Army, also a Northwestern unit, had moved eastwards from Xuzhou along the Longhai railway, passing Tai’erzhuang before advancing northwards towards Linyi. It crossed the Yi River on 12 March and attacked the Japanese left flank, engaging them from 13 to 18 March, during which the 39th Division managed to push the Japanese out of the Linyi region. Pursued by the Chinese from two directions, the Japanese were forced to withdraw, losing almost two entire battalions in the process. This engagement broke the myth of Japanese invincibility and also humiliated Japanese commander Seishirō Itagaki, even shocking the IJA headquarters. Although the Japanese 5th Division later regrouped and tried again, it had lost the element of surprise. The Japanese defeat at Linyi at the hands of the inferiorly trained and equipped Chinese regional units set the scene for the eventual battle at Tai'erzhuang.
Northern	Of the three Japanese divisions driving into the Chinese 5th War Area, the 10th Division, commanded by Rensuke Isogai, was the most successful. Setting out from Hebei, it crossed the Yellow River and moved southwards along the Jinpu railway. With KMT General Han Fuju having ordered his forces to desert their posts, the Japanese successfully captured Zhoucun and moved into Jinan without meeting any resistance at all. The Japanese then advanced southwards along two columns from Tai'an. The eastern column captured Mengyin before pushing westwards to capture Sishui. The western column advanced south-westwards along the Jinpu railway, capturing Yanzhou, Zouxian, and Jining, before driving north-westwards to capture Wenshang. Chiang Kai-shek then ordered Li Zongren to utilize 'offensive defense', i.e. seizing the initiative to actively attack, instead of passively defending. Thus, Li deployed Sun Zhen's 22nd Group Army to attack Zouxian from the south while Pang Bingxun's 40th Division advanced northwards along the 22nd's left flank to attack Mengyin and Sishui. Sun Tongxuan's 3rd Group Army also advanced from the south, launching a two-pronged attack on the Japanese at Jining. Fighting fiercely from 12 to 25 February, the respectable combat performance of the 12th Corps in particular helped to ameliorate the reputational damage that Han Fuju had otherwise inflicted upon on the Shandong units. The Japanese made some strategic changes as a result of these Chinese counterattacks: they cancelled their original plan of directly advancing westwards from Nanjing to Wuhan, so that more troops could be spared for the push towards Xuzhou.

== Battle ==
=== Opening shots (March 15 – March 21) ===
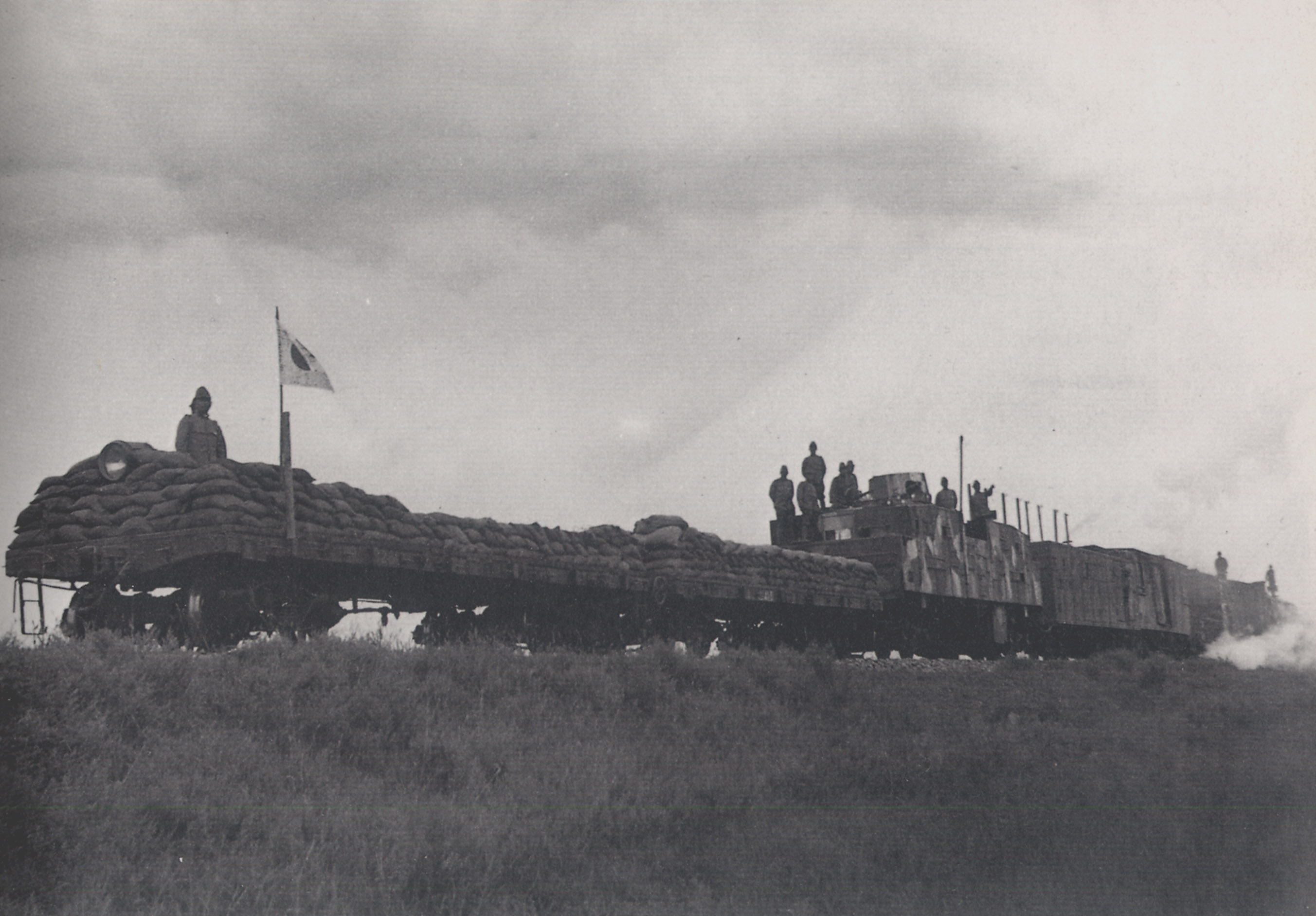
Japanese armored train near the Taierzhuang frontline, 1938

On March 15, the Japanese 10th Division attacked the Chinese 122nd Division centered around Tengxian and Lincheng. Chinese reinforcements from the 85th Army arrived the next day, but were forced back on March 17. The Japanese, with the support of planes, tanks and heavy artillery, broke through the Chinese lines on March 18.

The Chinese remnants, bolstered by the 52nd Army, retreated to the town of Yixian. The Japanese attacked the town, and destroyed an entire Chinese regiment in a fierce 24-hour battle. On March 19, the Japanese began their advance on the walled town of Taierzhuang.

=== Fighting outside Taierzhuang (March 22 – March 28) ===
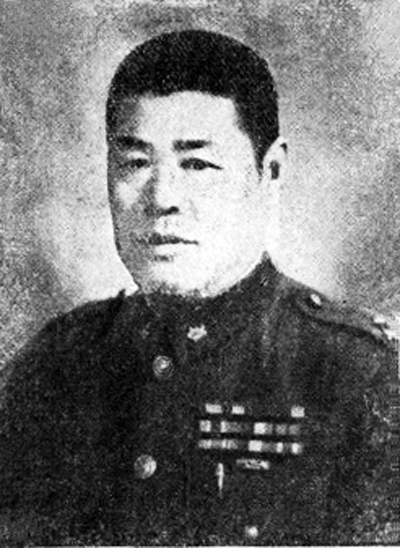
General Sun Lianzhong of the 2nd Army Group

To counter the threat, the Chinese 2nd Army Group under General Sun Lianzhong was deployed to Taierzhuang. The 31st Division under General Chi Fengcheng reached the town on March 22, and was ordered to delay the Japanese advance until the rest of the Army Group arrived.

On March 23, the 31st Division sallied out of Taierzhuang towards Yixian, but was attacked by two Japanese battalions reinforced by three tanks and four armored cars. The division took positions on a series of hills, and were able to defend against a Japanese regiment of 3,000 men for the rest of the day.

On March 24, a Japanese force of 5,000 men attacked the 31st Division. Another Japanese unit attacked the Chinese from Yixian, forcing them to withdraw to Taierzhuang itself. The Japanese attacked the town, and a 300-strong contingent successfully breached the north-eastern gate at 8pm. However, they were then forced back into the Chenghuang temple. The Chinese then set fire to the temple, killing the entire Japanese force. The next day, the Japanese launched another assault through the breached gate and secured the eastern portion of the district, before also breaching the north-western corner from the outside and capturing the Wenchang Pavilion.

On March 25, a Japanese morning attack was repelled. The Japanese followed up by shelling the Chinese positions with artillery and airstrikes. In the afternoon, the Chinese deployed an armored train towards Yixian. The train ambushed a column of Japanese soldiers near a hamlet, killing or wounding some 70 Japanese troops before quickly retreating back to Taierzhuang. When night fell, three thousand Chinese troops rushed out of the gates and attacked the Japanese lines under cover of darkness, forcing them back to the northeast by dawn.

The next three days would see the Chinese defenders subjected to continuous aerial and artillery bombardment. The Chinese were able to repulse several successive Japanese assaults, but suffered thousands of casualties in the process. On March 28, Chinese artillery support arrived in the form of two 155mm and ten 75mm pieces. On the night of March 29, the Japanese finally managed to breach the wall.

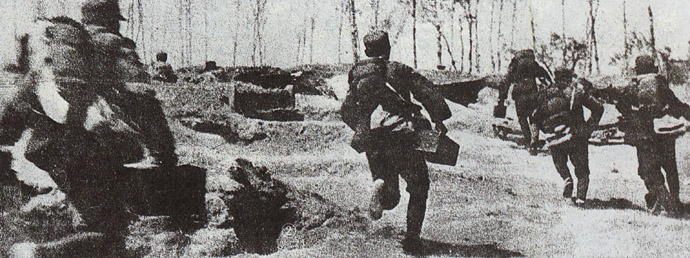
Chinese soldiers charge against Japanese positions in Taierzhuang

Setting out from the south of the district, a Chinese assault squad stormed the Wenchang pavilion from the south and east, killing the entire Japanese garrison with the exception of four Japanese troops taken as POWs. The Chinese had thus retaken the north-western corner of the district.

=== Urban fighting inside Taierzhuang (March 29 – April 5) ===
The Japanese attack into Taierzhuang devolved into a desperate hand-to-hand combat that lasted into the next day. The fighting in Taierzhuang's streets and alleys was characterized by fierce close quarters combat "very similar to the costly urban battles that Europe was soon to see," with combatants often confronting each other face to face.

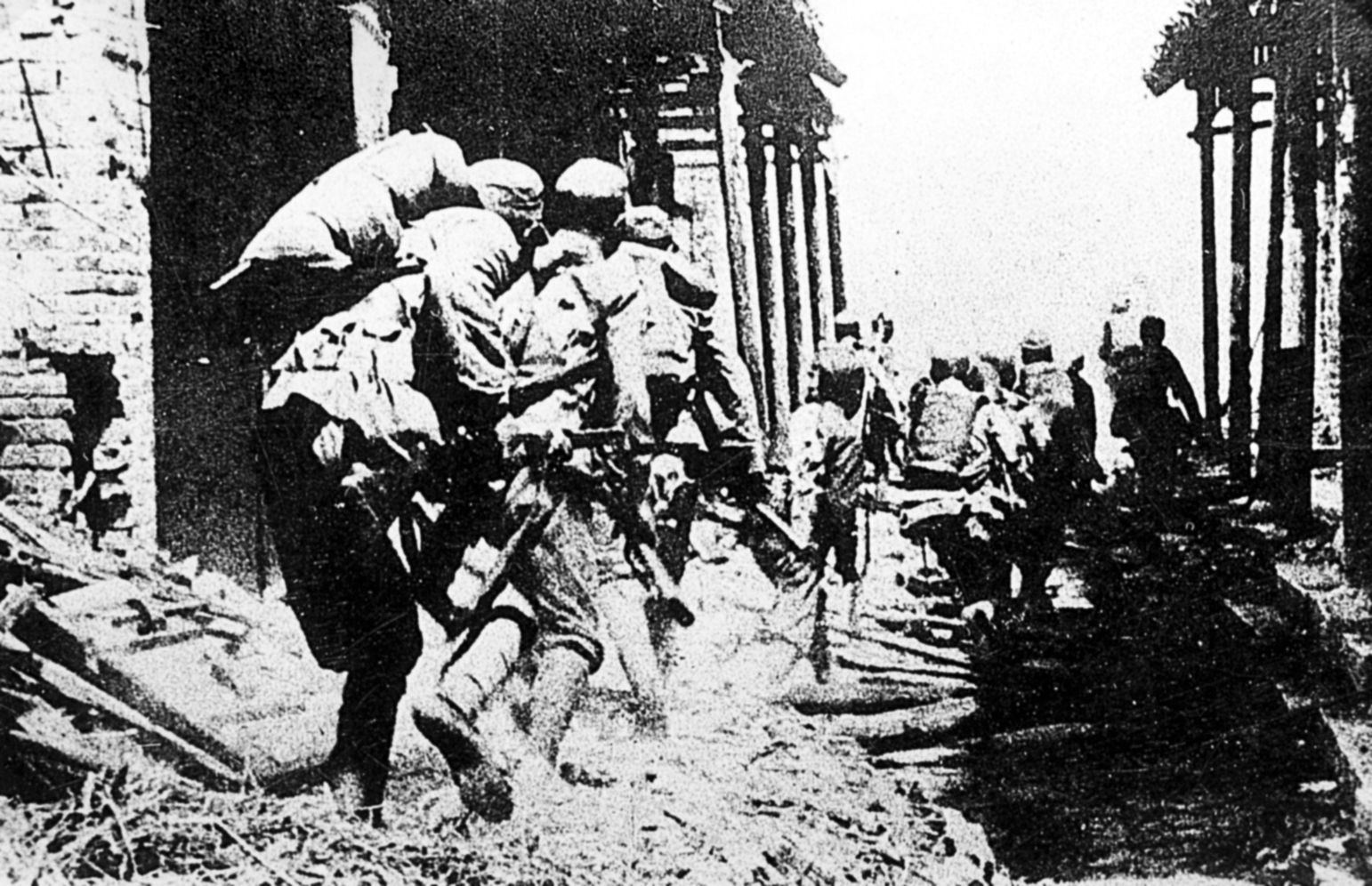
Chinese troops advance in the streets of Taierzhuang

Out of an initial squad of 57 Chinese soldiers tasked with capturing a building, only 10 survived. One participant described the brutal conditions of the battle:

"The battle continued day and night. The flames lit up the sky. Often all that separated our forces was a single wall. The soldiers would beat holes in the masonry to snipe at each other. We would be fighting for days over a single building, causing dozens of fatalities."

The conditions were so brutal that Chinese officers implemented severe measures to maintain discipline. Junior officers were repeatedly forbidden to retreat, often ordered to personally replace casualties within their ranks. Li Zongren personally threatened Tang Enbo that if he did not carry out his duty, he would "be treated as Han Fuju had been."

In Taierzhuang's cramped conditions, Japanese advantages in artillery and air superiority were rendered useless; whenever either was employed in the congested melee, as many Japanese were killed as Chinese. The fighting in Taierzhuang's streets was thus fought almost entirely by infantry, with each side relying on rifles, pistols, hand grenades, bayonets, and knives. The battle was fought hand-to-hand, often in darkness. The stone structures of Taierzhuang also provided sufficient cover from fire and projectiles. Historian Peter Harmsen notes that it was in these close-quarters conditions where Chinese soldiers were able to fight as the equals, if not the superiors of their Japanese enemies, as shown in the Shanghai suburb of Luodian the year prior.

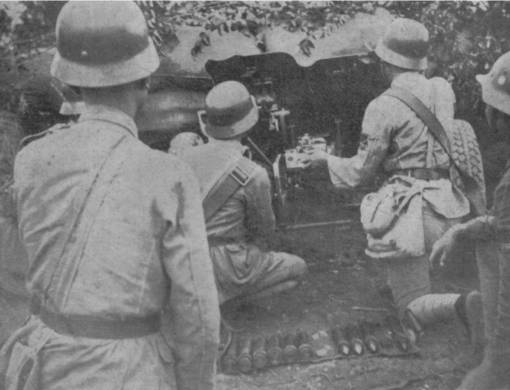
Chinese troops equipped with a 3.7 cm Pak 36 antitank gun

Sheng Cheng, based on the battle memories of General Chi Fengcheng, described the fighting:

"We had a battle for the little lanes [of the town], and unprecedently, not just streets and lanes, but even courtyards and houses. Neither side was willing to budge. Sometimes we'd capture a house, and dig a hole in the wall to approach the enemy. Sometimes the enemy would be digging a hole in the same wall at the same time. Sometimes we faced each other with hand grenades - or we might even bite each other. Or when we could hear that the enemy was in the house, then we'd climb the roof and drop bombs inside - and kill them all."

On March 31, General Sun Lianzhong arrived to take command of the 2nd Army Group. A Japanese attack later that day was repulsed, but a Chinese counterattack was also fought to a halt.

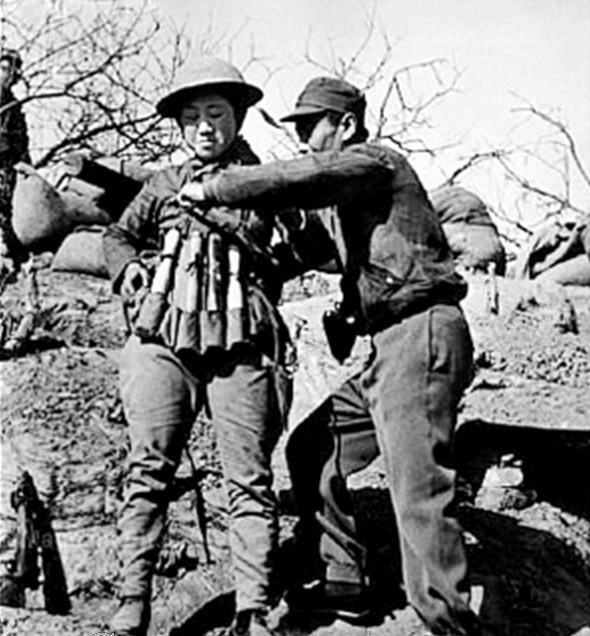
Chinese suicide bomber putting on an explosive vest made out of Model 24 hand grenades to use in an attack on Japanese tanks.

At 4am on April 1, the Japanese attacked the Chinese lines with support from 11 tanks. The Chinese defenders, equipped with German-made 37mm Pak-36 antitank guns, destroyed 8 of the armored vehicles at point-blank range. Similar incidents would repeat throughout the battle, with many Japanese tanks being destroyed by Chinese artillery and suicide bombers. In one skirmish, Chinese suicide bombers obliterated four Japanese tanks with grenade bundles.

That same day, Chiang ordered via telegram to his generals that "the enemy at Taierzhuang must be destroyed." On April 2 and 3, the Japanese deployed tear gas against Chinese positions in the town's north station, but failed to dislodge the defenders. They then followed up with a massive armored attack outside the city walls with 30 tanks and 60 armored cars, but were only able to push the Chinese 27th Division back to the Grand Canal.

The fighting continued to rage throughout April 4 and 5. By this point, the Japanese had taken two thirds of Taierzhuang, although the Chinese still held Taierzhuang's South Gate. It was through this entry point where the Chinese command was able to resupply their troops successfully. The Chinese were also able to prevent the Japanese from restocking their own supplies of arms and bullets. In doing so, the Japanese attackers were worn down slowly.

=== Chinese encirclement outside Taierzhuang (March 26 – April 7) ===
The deadlock of the battle was broken by events occurring outside Taierzhuang, where fresh Chinese divisions had encircled the Japanese forces in Taierzhuang from the flanks and rear. Having consulted their German advisors earlier, the commanders of the 5th War Area had prepared a double envelopment of the outstretched Japanese forces in Taierzhuang.

Between March and April 1938, the Nationalist Air Force of China deployed squadrons from the 3rd and 4th Pursuit Groups of fighter-attack planes in the long-distance air-interdiction and close-air support of the Taierzhuang operations. Some 30 aircraft, mainly Soviet models, were deployed in bombing raids against Japanese positions.

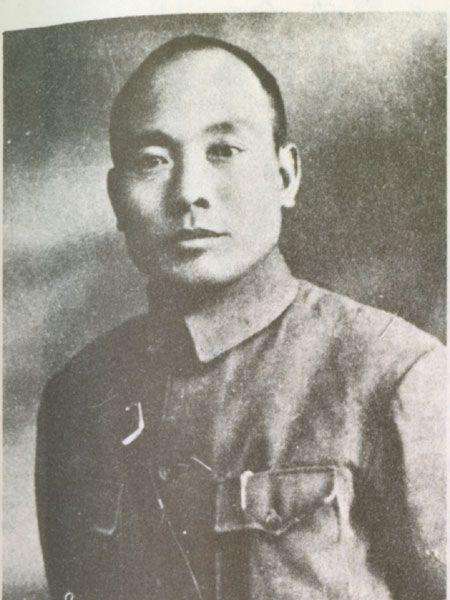
General Tang Enbo

On 26 March, Tang Enbo's 20th Corps, whom were equipped with artillery units, attacked Japanese forces in Yixian, killing half of the Japanese defenders and routing the rest. Tang then turned his forces south and attacked the Japanese flank northeast of Taierzhuang. At the same time, two divisions of the Chinese 55th Army made a surprise crossing across the Grand Canal and cut the railway line near Lincheng. As a result, Tang had cut off the Japanese attackers from the rear, severing their supply lines. On April 1, the Japanese 5th Division dispatched a brigade to relieve the surrounded 10th Division. General Tang countered this move by blocking the brigade's advance and then attacking from the rear, forcing them south into the encirclement. On 3 April, the Chinese 2nd Group Army launched a counter-offensive, with the 30th and 110th Divisions fighting northwards into Beiluo and Nigou respectively. On 6 April, the Chinese 85th and 52nd Army linked up at Taodun, just west of Lanling. The combined force then drove north-westwards, capturing Ganlugou. Two more Chinese divisions arrived a few days later.

=== Japanese retreat (April 5–7) ===
By April 5, The Japanese units inside Taierzhuang were surrounded by seven Chinese divisions to the north and four more to the south. By this point, the Japanese divisions in Taierzhuang had run critically low on ammunition, fuel, and food and water, and many of their troops were suffering from fatigue and dehydration after over a week of intense fighting.

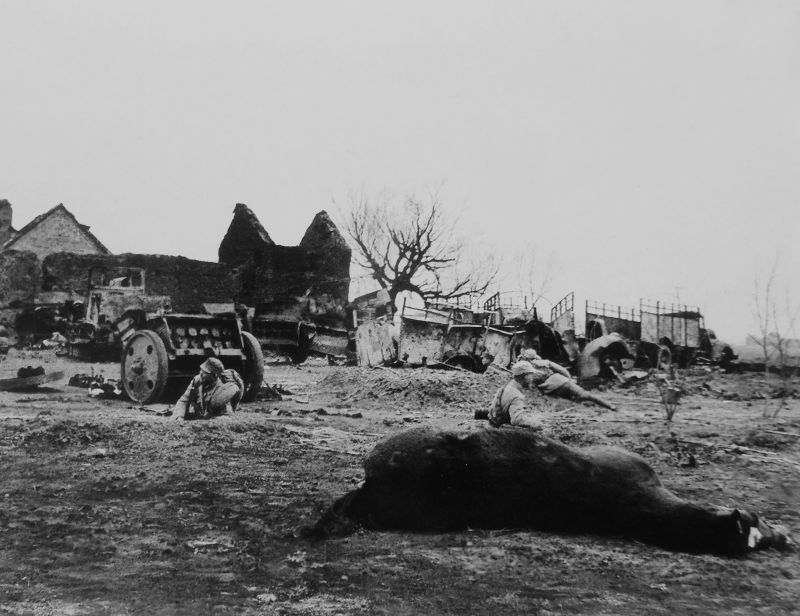
Chinese soldiers battle amidst destroyed Japanese trucks and dead horses near Taierzhuang, April 1938

The Chinese forces, sensing victory, were reinvigorated with rage and attacked the trapped Japanese troops, executing wounded Japanese soldiers where they lay with rifle and pistol shots. Chinese soldiers also deployed Soviet tanks against the Japanese defenders. Japanese artillery were unable to return fire for lack of shells, whilst their tanks were immobilized without fuel. Japanese attempts at airdropping supplies failed, and most of the packages fell into Chinese hands. Gradually, Japanese infantry were reduced to machine gun and mortar fire, then their rifles and machine guns, and finally bayonet charges.

With the various Chinese counter-attacks all accomplishing their objectives, the Japanese line finally collapsed on April 7. Both the 10th and 5th Divisions, having been bled dry of men and ammunition, were forced into retreat.

Around 2,000 Japanese soldiers fought their way out of Taierzhuang, leaving behind thousands of their dead. Some of the soldiers who left committed hara kiri. Chinese casualties were roughly the same, a significant improvement over the costly campaigns in Shanghai and Nanjing.

Major places mentioned in previous text within the region of Shandong Province

== Reasons for the Japanese failure ==
Some of the most critical reasons for the Japanese failure are as follows:

1. In the prelude to the battle, the Japanese were hampered by the 'offensive defensive' operations conducted by the various Chinese regional units, which effectively prevented the three Japanese divisions from ever achieving their objective of linking up with one another.
2. Despite repeatedly deploying heavy artillery, air strikes, and gas attacks, the Japanese were unable to force the Chinese 2nd Group Army from Tai'erzhuang and its surrounding regions, even as the defenders risked complete annihilation.
3. The Japanese failed to prevent the Chinese 20th Corps' maneuver around their rear positions, which cut off their retreat routes and gave the Chinese the advantage of a counter-encirclement.
4. Following Han Fuju's insubordination and subsequent execution, the Chinese military's high command rigorously adjusted the tone at the top by clamping down on military discipline, which pervaded down throughout the ranks and resulted in even the most junior soldiers willing to risk their lives in the course of carrying out their orders. For example, a "dare to die corps" was effectively used against Japanese units. They used swords and wore suicide vests made out of grenades.

Due to lack of anti-armor weaponry, suicide bombing was also used against the Japanese. Chinese troops, as part of the "dare-to-die" corps, strapped explosives like grenade packs or dynamite to their bodies and threw themselves under Japanese tanks to blow them up. Dynamite and grenades were strapped on by Chinese troops who rushed at Japanese tanks and blew themselves up.

== Casualties ==
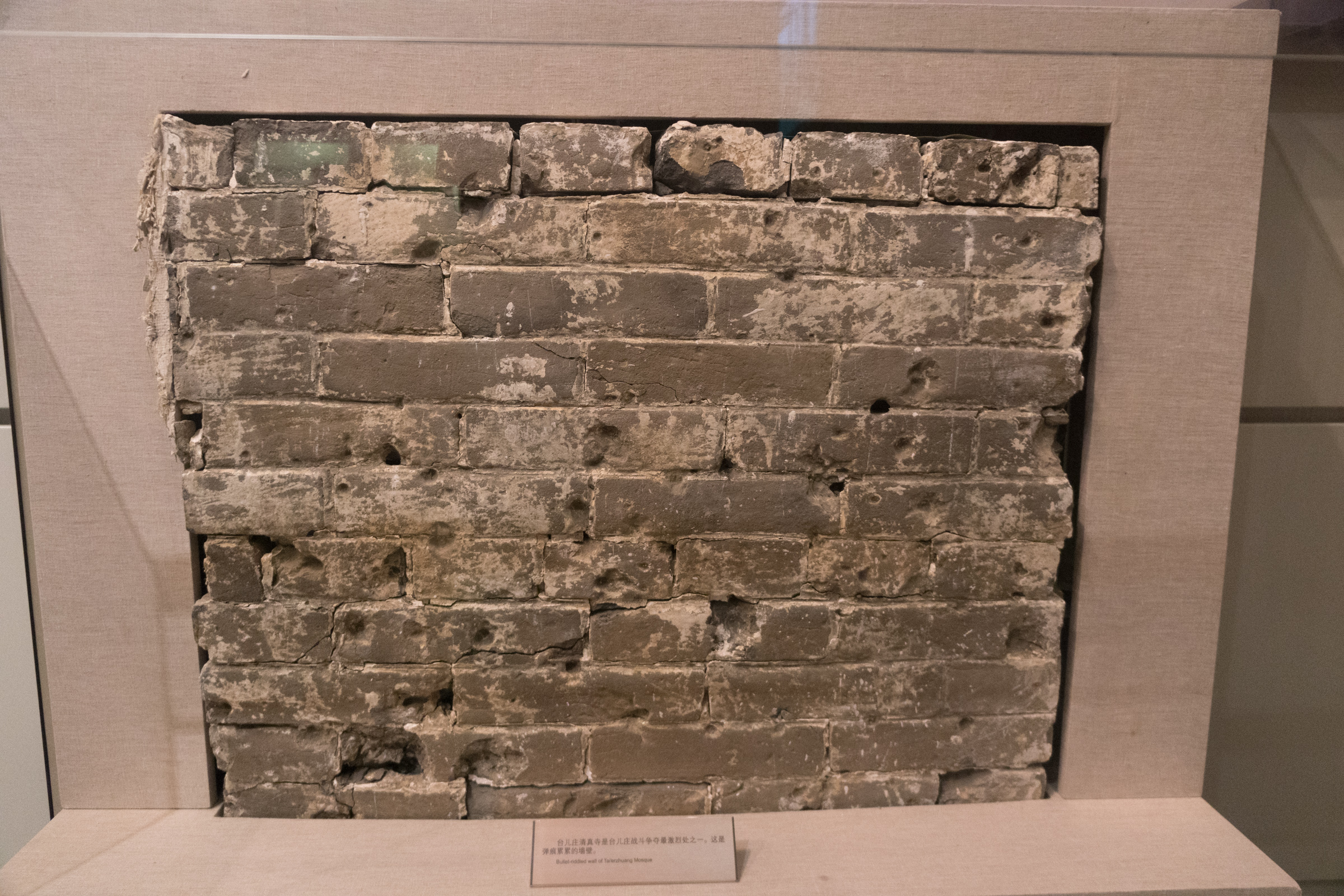
Bullet holes in a piece of Taierzhuang's masonry, preserved in National Museum of China

Frank Dorn, an American military officer stationed in China between 1934 and 1939, recorded that some 16,000 Japanese soldiers were killed in action on the Taierzhuang battlefield. American historian Stephen MacKinnon estimates between 15,000 and 20,000 Japanese troops died in the fighting. The Chinese claimed to have killed upwards of 24,000 Japanese troops, in addition to shooting down 3 aircraft and destroying or capturing 40 tanks.

British historian Rana Mitter provides a lower number, estimating that roughly 8,000 Japanese soldiers died in the fighting. Western historians Richard B Frank and Hans Van De Ven provide similar numbers, both estimating the number of fallen Japanese to be about 8,000. Western historians Peter Harmsen and Micheal Clodfelter estimate the Japanese suffered 20,000 killed and wounded, including 8,000 killed in action.

The Japanese also suffered significant losses in material. Due to a lack of fuel and the hasty Japanese retreat, many of their tanks, trucks and artillery pieces were abandoned on the battlefield to be captured by the Chinese. Frank Dorn recorded the Japanese lost 40 tanks, over 70 armored cars, and 100 trucks of various sizes. In addition to vehicles, the Japanese also lost dozens of artillery pieces and thousands of machine guns and rifles. Many of these weapons were collected by the Chinese forces for future use.

The Chinese for their part also suffered grievous casualties. Peter Harmsen and Stephen MacKinnon wrote that Chinese casualties matched Japanese losses in magnitude, roughly 20,000 in total. Frank Dorn reported that over 15,000 Chinese soldiers perished in the fighting, with at least that many wounded for a total of over 30,000 Chinese casualties. In General Chi Fengcheng's 31st Division alone, only 2,000 survivors out of an initial strength of 9,000 were fit to assemble for roll call after the battle. Taierzhuang itself was almost completely destroyed.

The Japanese claim in their combat reports that the withdrawal was due to command and communication failures, and do not portray a decline in ammunition types amongst their troops. A Japanese historical team listed figures of some 2,130 killed and 8,580 wounded for Japanese casualties in the battle of Xuzhou including in the Taierzhuang area. Similarly, the Imperial Japanese Army's 5th and 10th Divisions recorded that between February and May 1938, they lost some 2,369 killed and another 9,615 wounded including from other operations and units not present at Taierzhuang.

Chinese Historian Jiang Keshi analysis of Japanese records indicated that of the two main units present, the 10th Division's Seya Task Force suffered 411 dead and 1,319 wounded. Another 392 horses, four artillery pieces, 17 machine guns, 145 rifles, 4 tanks, and 7 tankettes, along with some fifty vehicles were also lost. Jiang was unable to locate complete records for the other main unit—the 5th Division's Sakamoto Task Force—but based on surviving partial records estimated their losses could be around 600-700 casualties and concluded the total casualties for the Japanese participating forces at Taierzhuang were less than 2500.

According to the Official Gazette, a total of 1,346 soldiers from the Japanese 5th and 10th Divisions were killed in action in the first phase of the Shandong Suppression Campaign from February 20 to April 7, 1938. The 5th Division lost 766 soldiers killed in action during this phase, including 578 killed in the Linyi battlefield from February 20 to March 29 and 188 killed in the Taierzhuang battlefield from March 31 to April 7. The 10th Division lost 475 soldiers killed in action in the same period, including 448 killed in the Taierzhuang battlefield from March 23 to April 7. In the "Great Victory of Taierzhuang", approximately 120,000 troops of Tang Enbo's corps and Sun Lianzhong's group army fought against more than 16,000 troops of the Seya and Sakamoto Task Forces, with a total of 636 Japanese soldiers killed in action. Using this set of data, Professor Jiang Keshi summarized the following points :

- The losses of the 5th Division in Linyi were greater than the losses of the 10th Division in Taierzhuang, indicating that the Japanese operation in the former battlefield was less successful than the latter.
- Most of the losses of the 10th Division in the first phase of the Shandong Suppression Campaign occurred since the start of the battle of Taierzhuang on March 23, with light losses suffered the week before (including in Tengxian).
- The total number of Japanese troops killed in the Taierzhuang battlefield was roughly equal to the number of troops of the Sakamoto task force killed in the Linyi battlefield. The Chinese Army deployed approximately twice the number of troops in the Taierzhuang battlefield than in the Linyi battlefield. (Note: Roughly 120,000 troops from Tang Enbo’s and Sun Lianzhong’s troops in Taierzhuang compared to roughly 60,000 troops in the Linyi battlefield. However, the Linyi battlefield was officially recorded by the Chinese Army as ending on April 20. Of the five infantry divisions, one infantry brigade, one cavalry division, one cavalry brigade, and one cavalry regiment alongside the Shandong marines and peace preservation units under Shen Honglie that made up the 57,875 figure, most of the units were deployed to the battlefield in April. The Linyi frontline was initially garrisoned in January 1938 by only Pang Bingxun’s 39th Division and Shen Honglie’s troops with Zhang Zizhong’s 38th and 180th Divisions participating in the relief attempt on March 14.)
- Despite making up a large portion of the Chinese Army in the Taierzhuang battlefield (as many as 73,000 troops), Tang Enbo's corps did not achieve significant results in the battle, with approximately 260 Japanese soldiers killed in action facing them compared to 370 killed facing Sun Lianzhong's group army.

Despite the Chinese Army’s highlight for the "Great Victory of Taierzhuang", the Japanese Second Army suffered more losses in the second phase of the Shandong Suppression Campaign. The 10th Division’s casualties in the second phase was more than two times its casualties in the first phase. Its Nagase task force in particular was hit hard with a total of 3,154 casualties including 793 killed. The 40th Infantry Regiment of the Nagase Task Force alone lost more troops in the battle near Yuwang Mountain (Note: Against the three divisions of the 60th Army of the Yunnan Army and other Chinese units.) than the Seya Task Force in the entire Taierzhuang battlefield. The 5th Division also suffered heavy casualties in this phase, with its Kunizaki Task Force of 7,607 troops suffering 901 casualties (including 144 killed) in the battle of Yizhou from April 16 to April 20, 215 casualties (including 51 killed) in the battles of Tancheng County and Matou Town from April 22 to April 25, and 1,683 casualties (including 454 killed) in the battles near Laogou from April 26 to May 15. (Note: The battles of Yizhou, Tancheng County, and Matou Town were fought against the approximately 60,000 troops under the command of Pang Bingxun, Zhang Zizhong, and Shen Honglie in the Linyi frontline and the battles near Laogou were fought largely against the two divisions of the 46th Army.) The total losses the Kunizaki Task Force in this phase was greater than the losses of the Seya Task Force in Taierzhuang. However, since the second phase was associated with the Chinese defeat at Xuzhou, despite inflicting greater casualties on the Japanese Second Army, (Note: 2,961 killed in the second phase compared to 1,329 killed in the first.) it was not widely publicized as the Battle of Taierzhuang.

== Aftermath ==
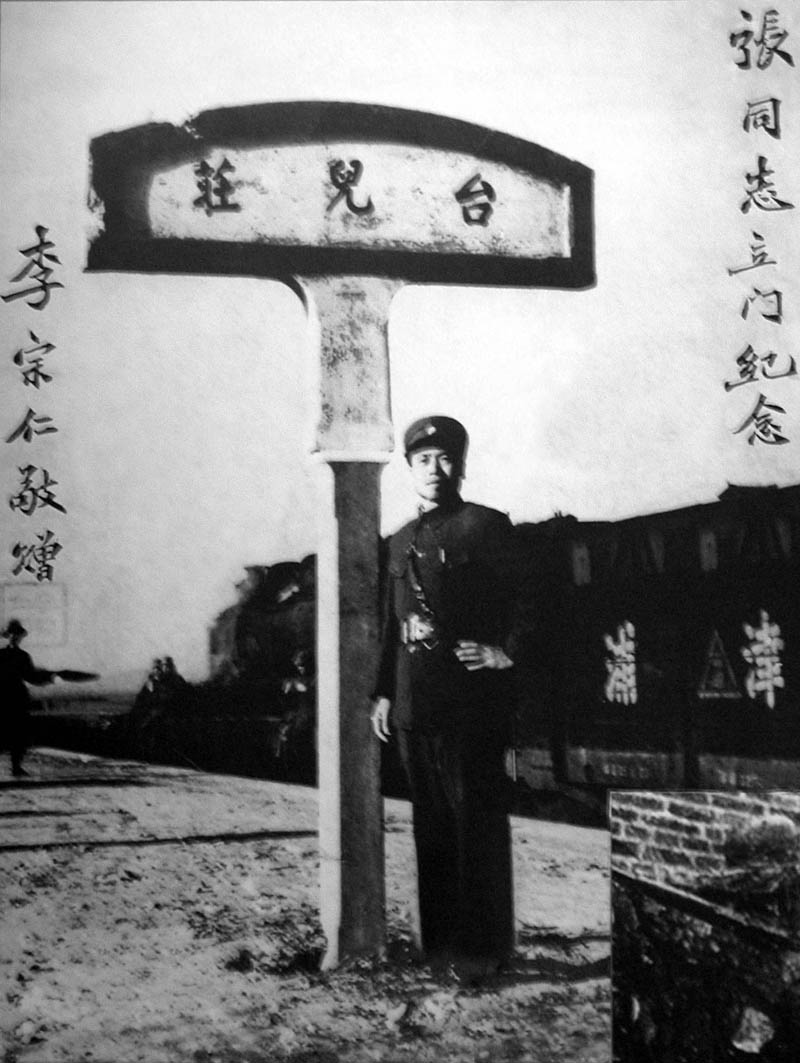
Li Zongren at the Taierzhuang station of Tianjin–Pukou railway after the battle

The defeat was a significant blow to the Japanese military. It was the first major Japanese defeat since the beginning of the war, broke the myth of Imperial Japanese military invincibility, and resulted in an incalculable benefit to Chinese morale, military and non-military. Li Zongren said that the victory "was the first happy occasion since the war of resistance had started," and that Taierzhuang became "a symbol of national renaissance." General Feng Yuxiang compared the trapped Japanese in the Ta Kung Pao newspaper to "soft-shelled turtles in a closed jar."

Amid the celebrations of the victory in Hankou and other Chinese cities, Japan initially denied its defeat and ridiculed the reports of the battle for days. The battle was reported on by The New York Times.

The Chinese military victory was short-term. In May 1938, Japanese forces succeeded in taking the town and the nearby rail junction of Xuzhou.

== Commemoration ==
In the short-term, the battle became a major topic of cultural works such as spoken drama and political cartoons.

In 2006, the Taierzhuang Battlefield became a National priority protected site as no. 981 of the 6th batch of National priority historic sites.
