= Sun Lianzhong =

Chinese general (1893–1990)

General 2nd Rank Sun Lianzhong
- 孫連仲
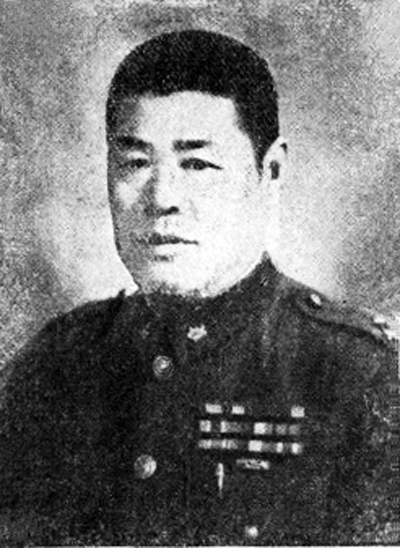
- General Sun Lianzhong

Personal details
- Born: 2 February 1893 Xiong County, Hebei, China
- Died: 14 August 1990 (aged 97) Taipei, Taiwan
- Nickname: The Steel Head

Military service
- Allegiance: Republic of China
- Branch/service: (Republic of China (1912–1949)) National Revolutionary Army
- Years of service: 1912–1949
- Rank: General 2nd Rank
- Unit: Northwest Army
- Commands: Second Group Army, Commander of the Nanjing Garrison
- Battles/wars: Northern Expedition; Central Plains War; Second Sino-Japanese War; Beiping–Hankou Railway Operation; Battle of Taiyuan; Battle of Xuzhou; Battle of West Hubei; Operation 5; Battle of Changde; Chinese Civil War

Chinese name
- Traditional Chinese: 孫連仲
- Simplified Chinese: 孙连仲
Transcriptions
Standard Mandarin
- Hanyu Pinyin: Sūn Liánzhòng
- Wade–Giles: Sun Lien-chung

Sun Lianzhong (Chinese: 孫連仲; Wade–Giles: Sun Lien-chung; 2 February 1893 – 14 August 1990) was a Chinese general during the Warlord Era, Second Sino-Japanese War and Chinese Civil War. Best known for his command of the 2nd Group Army in the Battle of Taierzhuang, he had a long career in the army.

== Biography ==
Sun enlisted in the army in 1912. During the Warlord Era, he was a member of the Northwest Army led by Feng Yuxiang. During the Northern Expedition he fought with Zhang Zuolin's Fengtian Clique, and fought with Feng and Yan Xishan against Chiang Kai-shek in the Central Plains War. He eventually rejoined the Nanjing government, and commanded Nationalist forces during the 2nd, 3rd and 5th Campaigns against the Jiangxi Soviet.

During the Second Sino-Japanese War, he commanded the 1st Army in the Northern Peiking – Hankow Railway Operation, and the 2nd Group Army in the Battle of Taiyuan and the Battle of Xuzhou. As Deputy Commander of the 6th war Area he was in command of the Chinese forces during the Battle of West Hubei, and as Commander-in-Chief of the 6th War Area, he defeated the Japanese at the Battle of Changde. He went on to command the 6th War Area until the end of the war.

In 1945, Sun Lianzhong was made Commander-in-Chief of the 11th War Area and ordered to reoccupy Tianjin, Beiping, Baoding, and Shijiazhuang and accept the surrender of the Japanese troops there. However the KMT forces soon engaged in conflict with the Chinese Communist forces and the Chinese Civil War broke out in full force again. Sun served as the Commander of the Baoding Pacification Headquarters. After two years he resigned his posts in Northern China, and retreated with the Nationalist government to Taiwan. In Taiwan, he opened a restaurant with Pang Bingxun, and served as an advisor to the government and a member of the Central Committee of the Kuomintang. Sun died in Taipei in 1990, at the age of 97.

== See also ==
- Battle of Central Plains
- History of the Republic of China
- Second Sino-Japanese War
- Warlord Era
- Chinese Civil War
