= Toshizō Nishio =

Imperial Japanese Armt general (1881–1960)

- 西尾 寿造

Governor of Tokyo
- In office 25 July 1944 – 23 August 1945
- Monarch: Hirohito
- Preceded by: Shigeo Ōdachi
- Succeeded by: Hisatada Hirose

Member of the Supreme War Council
- In office 1 March 1941 – 1 May 1943
- Monarch: Hirohito

Personal details
- Born: 31 October 1881 Tottori City, Tottori, Japan
- Died: 26 October 1960 (aged 78) Tokyo, Japan
- Resting place: Tama Cemetery
- Education: Army War College
- Awards: Order of the Rising Sun; Order of the Golden Kite

Military service
- Allegiance: Empire of Japan
- Branch/service: Imperial Japanese Army
- Years of service: 1902–1943
- Rank: General
- Unit: 40th Infantry Regiment
- Commands: Imperial Guard, Second Army, Thirteenth Army, Inspectorate General of Military Training, China Expeditionary Army
- Battles/wars: Russo-Japanese War; Second Sino-Japanese War; Beiping–Hankou Railway Operation; Tianjin–Pukou Railway Operation; Battle of Xuzhou; 1939–1940 Winter Offensive; World War II; Pacific War

Toshizō Nishio (西尾 寿造, Nishio Toshizō; 31 October 1881 – 26 October 1960) was a general in the Imperial Japanese Army, considered to be one of the most successful and ablest strategists during the Second Sino-Japanese War, who commanded the Japanese Second Army during the first years after the Marco Polo Bridge incident.

== Early life and career ==
Nishio was born in Tottori Prefecture, and was a graduate of the 14th class of the Imperial Japanese Army Academy in 1902, and the 22nd class of the Army War College. He was commissioned a second lieutenant in June 1903 and served during the Russo-Japanese War, seeing combat at the Battle of Sandepu. He was promoted to lieutenant in February 1905, to captain in December 1909, to major in November 1916 and to lieutenant colonel in August 1920.

Nishio was first attached to the 10th Regiment/10th Division from 1921 to 1923; he was promoted to colonel on 6 August 1923. Afterward, he was an instructor at the Army War College until 1925 when he became commanding officer of the 40th Regiment/10th Division. From 1926 to 1929 he was Chief of the 1st Section, Inspectorate General of Military Training. Promoted to major general on 1 August 1929, he was assigned to command the 39th Brigade of the IJA 20th Division, stationed in Korea. From 1930 to 1932 he was Chairman of Military Investigation in the Ministry of War. He was promoted to lieutenant general on 1 August 1933, becoming the Head of the 4th Bureau of the General Staff in 1934.

== China ==
On 5 March 1934, Nishio was appointed Chief of Staff of the Kwantung Army in Manchukuo, where he oversaw the establishment of the reorganization of the Manchukuo Imperial Army and the pacification of Manchukuo. In March 1936 he became Vice Chief of the General Staff and Acting Head of the General Affairs Bureau, of the General Staff. In early 1937, he briefly commanded the Imperial Guards Division, before being transferred to China at the beginning of the Second Sino-Japanese War.

After the Marco Polo Bridge Incident Nishio was sent to North China, and took command of the Second Army on 26 August 1937. He oversaw the Tianjin–Pukou Railway Operation that took the Japanese to the Yellow River. He was at the Battle of Xuzhou, crossing the Yellow River and overrunning Shandong until 30 April 1938. Shortly after the defeat his army suffered in the Battle of Taierzhuang, he was replaced and returned to Tokyo to be Inspector-General of Military Training.

Promoted to general on 1 August 1939, Nishio returned to China again to take command of the Thirteenth Army on 12 September for a month and then took command of all the forces in China as Commander in Chief of the China Expeditionary Army on 22 September. He oversaw the Battle of Zaoyang-Yichang and the First Battle of Changsha. His force withstood the Chinese 1939-40 Winter Offensive and rolled back their gains in the spring with many operations including the Battle of Zaoyang-Yichang. His forces were again struck in North China by the Hundred Regiments Offensive, while he continued attacks in the Yangtze valley in the Central Hopei Operation and Western Hopei Operation. On 1 March 1941 he was replaced and returned to Japan to become a member of the Supreme War Council until he retired in 1943.

== Return to Japan ==
Nishio took up the governorship of the Tokyo Metropolis from 1944 to the end of World War II. Although arrested after World War II by the American occupation authorities, who accused him of unnamed war crimes, formal charges were never brought to trial and he was later released.

Government offices
Preceded by Shigeo Ōdachi	Governor of Tokyo Metropolis; July 1944–August 1945	Succeeded by Hisatada Hirose
Military offices
Preceded by Kiyoshi Katsuki	Commander of Imperial Guard Division; March 1937-August 1937	Succeeded by Sadakata Iida
Preceded by Oku Yasukata	Commander of 2nd Army; August 1937-April 1938	Succeeded by Prince Naruhiko Higashikuni
Preceded by Rikichi Andō	Inspector-General of Military Training; April 1938–October 1940	Succeeded by Otozō Yamada
Preceded by none	Commander-in-Chief, China Expeditionary Army; 1939–1941	Succeeded by Shunroku Hata
