= List of military regions of the National Revolutionary Army =

The military theaters (Chinese: 戰區; pinyin: zhànqū; also called war areas) of the National Revolutionary Army were 76 northern military districts and the largest formations of the National Revolutionary Army, under the Military Affairs Commission, chaired by Chiang Kai-shek during the Second Sino-Japanese War and World War II. During the Second Sino-Japanese War the National Revolutionary Army eventually organized itself into twelve Military Regions.

In August 1937 there were:

NRA military regions in August 1937

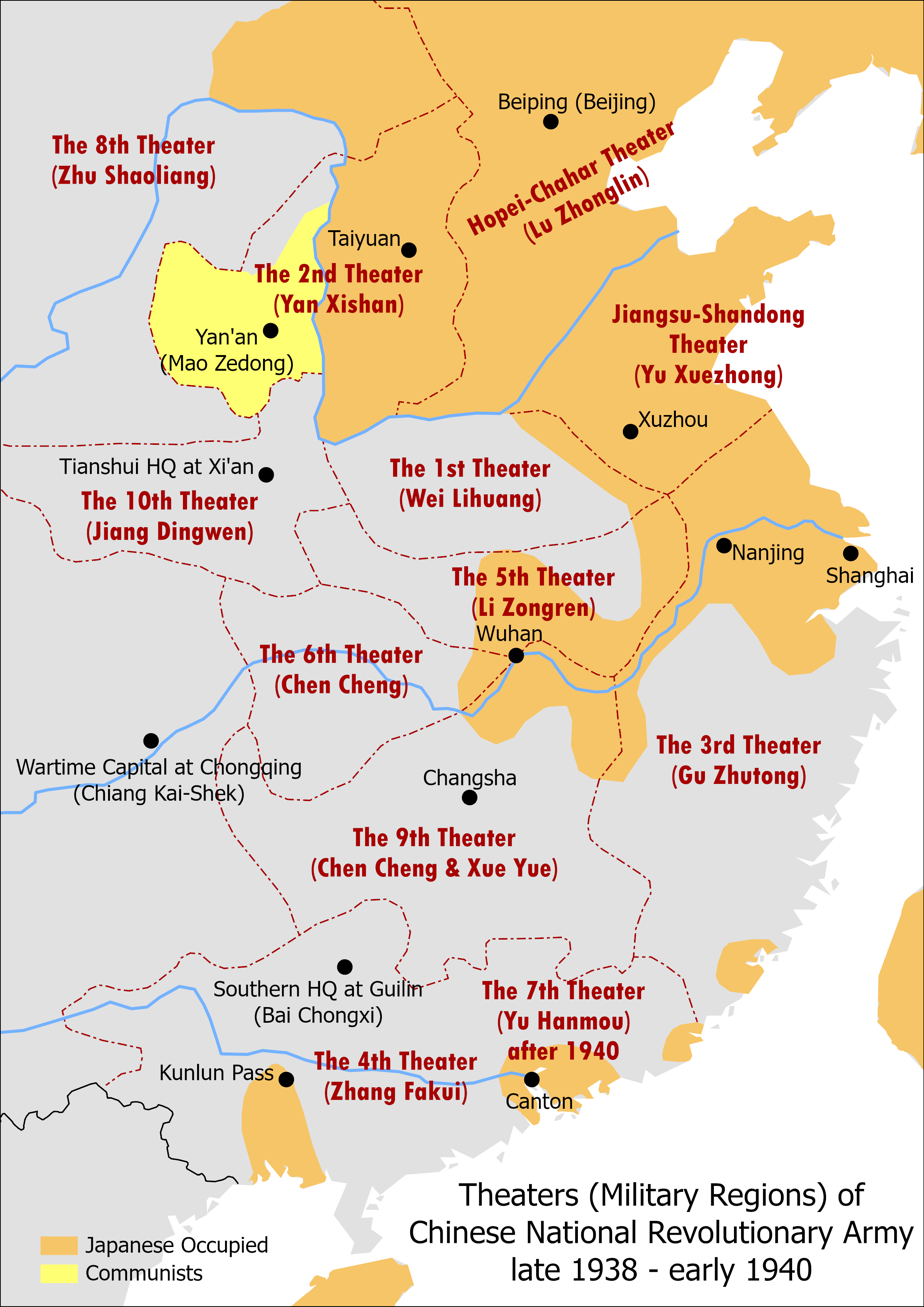
NRA operational regions from late 1938 to early 1940

Region	Area of Operations
1st Military Region	Hebei, northern Beijing–Hankou railway Front (in September 1937)
2nd Military Region	Shanxi
3rd Military Region	Shanghai
5th Military Region	Tianjin-Pukou Railway Front (From Oct. 1937)
6th Military Region	Tianjin-Pukou Railway Front (September - October 1937)

As the Japanese advanced, three more military regions were formed and the older ones reassigned on 17 January 1938 following the capture of Nanjing.

Region	Area of Operations
1st Military Region	northern Beijing–Hankou railway Front
2nd Military Region	Shanxi
3rd Military Region	Jiangsu, Zhejiang
4th Military Region	Guangdong, Guangxi
5th Military Region	Tianjin-Pukou Railway Front
8th Military Region	Gansu, Ningxia, Qinghai, Suiyuan

Following the Battle of Xuzhou and Northern and Eastern Henan 5th Military Region defended Anhui and Hubei north of the Yangtze River. 1st Military Region defended Henan. 3rd Military Region extended itself to defend Anhui south of the Yangtze. 4th Military Region extended its command to the coast of Fujian.

In early July 1938, during the battle of Wuhan the 9th Military Region was activated. It commanded the 1st and 2nd Army Corps, the Wuhan Garrison, units in Jiangxi west of Poyang Lake, and in southern Hubei and Hunan south of the Yangtze River.

Following the Battle of Wuhan the Chinese army was reorganized along with the military regions.

Region	Area of Operations
1st Military Region	Henan, part of northern Anhui
2nd Military Region	Shanxi, part of Shaanxi
3rd Military Region	Jiangsu, Anhui south of the Yangtze, Zhejiang, Fujian
4th Military Region	Guangdong, Guangxi
5th Military Region	Western Anhui, Hubei north of the Yangtze, southern Henan
8th Military Region	Gansu, Ningxia, Qinghai, Suiyuan
9th Military Region	northwestern Jiangxi, Hubei south of the Yangtze, and Hunan
10th Military Region	Shaanxi

Additionally there were two special military regions behind Japanese lines:

- Shandong-Jiangsu Military Region - northern Jiangsu and Shandong.
- Hebei-Chahar Military Region - Hebei and Chahar

6th Military Region was reactivated a second time in October 1939, after the first Battle of Changsha. It commanded forces in Hubei south of the Yangtze and west of the Xiang River. It included forces formerly part of 9th Military Region.
