= Pang Bingxun =

Chinese general (1879–1963)

General 2nd Rank Pang Bingxun
- 龐炳勳
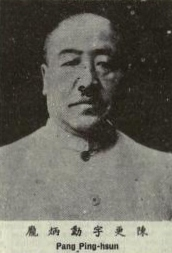
- General Pang Bingxun

Personal details
- Born: 25 October 1879 Xinhe County, Hebei, China
- Died: 12 January 1963 (aged 83) Taipei, Taiwan
- Education: Manchurian Surveying Academy
- Awards: Order of Blue Sky and White Sun, Order of the Ferocious Tiger
- Nickname: Pang The Undead

Military service
- Allegiance: (Republic of China (1912–1949)) Republic of China; Nanjing Government
- Branch/service: (Republic of China (1912–1949)) National Revolutionary Army
- Years of service: 1900–1949
- Rank: General 2nd Rank
- Unit: Northwestern Army
- Commands: 39th division, 3rd army, 40th corps, 24th army group, provincial governor of Hebei
- Battles/wars: Xinhai Revolution, Zhili–Anhui War, First Zhili–Fengtian War, Beijing Coup, Second Zhili–Fengtian War, Anti-Fengtian War, Northern Expedition, Central Plains War, Defense of the Great Wall, Actions in Inner Mongolia (1933–1936), Third encirclement campaign against the Shaanxi–Gansu Soviet, Battle of Beiping–Tianjin, Battle of Taierzhuang, Battle of South Shanxi, Handan Campaign

Pang Bingxun (simplified Chinese: 庞炳勋; traditional Chinese: 龐炳勳; pinyin: Pang Bingxun; Wade–Giles: P'ang Ping-hsun; October 25, 1879 – January 12, 1963) was a high-ranking nationalist military commander who fought against the Imperial Japanese Army and Chinese Communist Army. He stopped the IJA 5th Division led by General Seishirō Itagaki, one of the principal architects of the 1931 Manchurian incident, from capturing Linyi and converging with General Rensuke Isogai's IJA 10th Division at Tai'erzhuang District, foiling their plan to assault Xuzhou.

== Early life and career ==
General Pang was born in a rural household in Hebei Province and joined the newly formed modern army under the Qing dynasty. After graduating from the Manchurian Surveying Academy, he was given a rank equivalent to that of a captain. When the Xinhai Revolution broke out in 1911 his superiors suspected him of being a revolutionary sympathizer and forced him to resign. After he returned home, Pang started several small businesses in order to make a living. In 1920, when a bad drought hit his hometown and a famine broke out, he decided to take up military service again at the age of 41. So he entered the Northwestern Army and served under a number of local warlords, and eventually became one of the best known military commanders in the North China Region. When Generalissimo Chiang Kai-shek launched the Northern Expedition in 1926, Pang was serving under General Wu Peifu, one of the most powerful warlords who had control over Central and Northern China. Pang demonstrated his political shrewdness when he announced his support for the nationalist revolution and joined with General Tang Shengzhi. After Chiang Kai-shek purged the communists in the Shanghai massacre, the Wuhan Nationalist Government ordered Pang Bingxun to attack Nanjing. Pang instead joined General Feng Yuxiang's Second Army Group and became a division commander in Feng's units. He fought with courage and distinction for Feng Yuxiang in the Central Plains War, but when General Zhang Xueliang, Commander-in-chief of the Northeastern Border Defense Army, formerly known as the Fengtian clique declared himself for Chiang Kai-shek, the anti-Chaing forces were quickly defeated. Pang again switched sides and once again declared support for the Nationalist Government who appointed him as commander of the 40th corps. He participated in a number of actions against the Chinese Communist forces in Shaanxi province and defended North China against the Imperial Japanese Army invasion led by Field Marshal Baron Nobuyoshi Mutō in the Defense of the Great Wall. In 1935, General Feng Yuxiang and a number of his old colleagues were involved in the Actions in Inner Mongolia (1933–1936) against Japanese penetration of the region. Because President Chiang Kai-shek still held out hopes for a peaceful settlement with Japan. President Chiang sent War minister General He Yingqin to disband Feng Yuxiang's Chahar People's Anti-Japanese Army and named Pang Bingxun as Chairman of Chahar Province in order to appease the Japanese military leaders. The Nationalist Government made him a lieutenant general in 1936 and General Pang once again showed support for Chiang Kai-shek during the Xi'an Incident and subsequently joined the Second Sino-Japanese War next year.

== Second Sino-Japanese War ==
In July 1937, General Pang Bingxun joined the Second Sino-Japanese War in North China. When Japanese forces struck in the Battle of Beiping–Tianjin, he covered the retreat of General Song Zheyuan's 29th Army into Shandong Province. In December 1937 his unit became part of the 5th war zone under General Li Zongren, and from March 16 to April 17, 1938, he and General Zhang Zizhong fought a bloody defensive action against General Seishirō Itagaki which contributed to the Chinese victory in the Battle of Taierzhuang. After the Battle of Xuzhou he was transferred again to North China, and engaged heavily against the Japanese forces in the region. He was promoted as commander-in-chief of the 24th Army Group and became provincial governor of Hebei province. During his tenure as governor, his forces was clashed with the communist Eighth Route Army which led the two sides to work out a political settlement which led to the easing of armed conflicts soon afterwards. In 1941, the Japanese Northern China Area Army under General Hayao Tada launched Battle of South Shanxi which resulted in a defeat of the Nationalist forces. General Pang was already over 60 years old and asked to resign, but President Chiang Kai-shek turned down his request because experienced commanders were hard to find at the time. General Pang continued to harass and was frustrated with the continued Japanese military presence in North China. In April 1943, 50,000 Japanese soldiers under General Yasuji Okamura stepped up their military offensives against Chinese resistance in the region and achieved a decisive breakthrough against General Pang's defensive perimeter, resulting in most of his units fleeing southward. During the breakout from the Japanese attack, he lost touch with his Army headquarters and was forced to hide in a cave. General Sun Dianying, commander of 5th corps of Chinese puppet forces and a Japanese lieutenant captured him and forced him to surrender to Japan. General Pang was taken to the Japanese corps headquarters and on May 23, 1943, President Wang Jingwei of the Nanjing regime appointed him as commander-in-chief of the 24th Army Group. After he surrendered to Japan, the KMT government tried to win him back, and Pang agreed to rejoin the national resistance. But the Japanese command learned of his plans and disbanded his units. In 1944 he was reassigned as to Henan as pacification director of Kaifeng and he again contacted Chongqing through the Bureau of Investigation and Statistics under Lieutenant General Dai Li. So when Japanese forces in China surrendered the next year President Chiang Kai-shek again appointed him as commander-in-chief of the vanguard forces, commissioning him to prevent the region from falling into the hands of Chinese communists.

== Chinese Civil War and retirement ==
In 1946 the Chinese Civil War resumed, and General Pang handed his unit to the Nationalist government in Nanjing. General Sun Dianying was made commander of the 40th corps, while also concurrently serving as commander-in-chief of the 24th Army Group. But the People's Liberation Army under Marshal Liu Bocheng defeated Pang and Sun's Nationalist troops in the Handan Campaign. General Pang was tasked to reorganize these broken units, and named a military advisor to the Ministry of National Defense (Republic of China), after which he went into retirement. Before the Chinese Communist forces under Marshal Lin Biao took over North China he left Henan for Nanjing in 1948. After the Huaihai campaign he followed President Chiang Kai-shek and other nationalist leaders to Taiwan. Unable to make ends meet with his meager salary, he opened up a restaurant in Taipei with his old friend General Sun Lianzhong. He died in Taiwan on January 12, 1963.

== Military career ==
- 1937 General Officer Commanding 39th Division
- 1937–1938 General Officer Commanding 3rd Army
- 1937–1941 General Officer Commanding XXXX Corps
- 1940–1943 Chairman of the Government of Hebei Province
- 1943 Surrender to Japan
- 1943–1945 Command 24th Group Army puppet troops

== See also ==
- Second Sino-Japanese War
