= Tang Enbo =

Chinese general (1899–1954)

- 湯恩伯
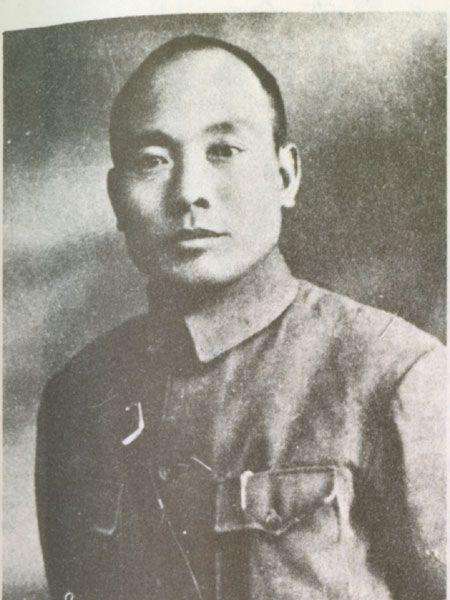
- General Tang Enbo
- Born: September 20, 1899; Wuyi, Zhejiang, Qing Dynasty
- Died: June 29, 1954 (aged 54); Tokyo, Japan
- Burial place: Wuzhi Mountain Military Cemetery
- Military career
- Allegiance: Republic of China
- Branch: Republic of China Army
- Service years: 1926–1954
- Rank: General
- Nickname: The Iron Man
- Unit: 89th division
- Commands: 13th corps, 20th Army, 3rd war zone
- Conflicts: Second Sino-Japanese War; Battle of Taierzhuang; Battle of Henan-Hunan-Guangxi; Chinese Civil War; Menglianggu Campaign; Shanghai Campaign
- Awards: Order of Blue Sky and White Sun
- Other work: Politician

Tang Enbo (Note: simplified Chinese: 汤恩伯; traditional Chinese: 湯恩伯; pinyin: Tāng Énbó; Wade–Giles: T'ang En-po, birth name Tang Keqin (simplified Chinese: 汤克勤; traditional Chinese: 湯克勤; pinyin: Tāng Kèqín)) (1899–1954) was a Chinese Nationalist general in the Republic of China.

== Life ==
=== Early life and war with Japan ===
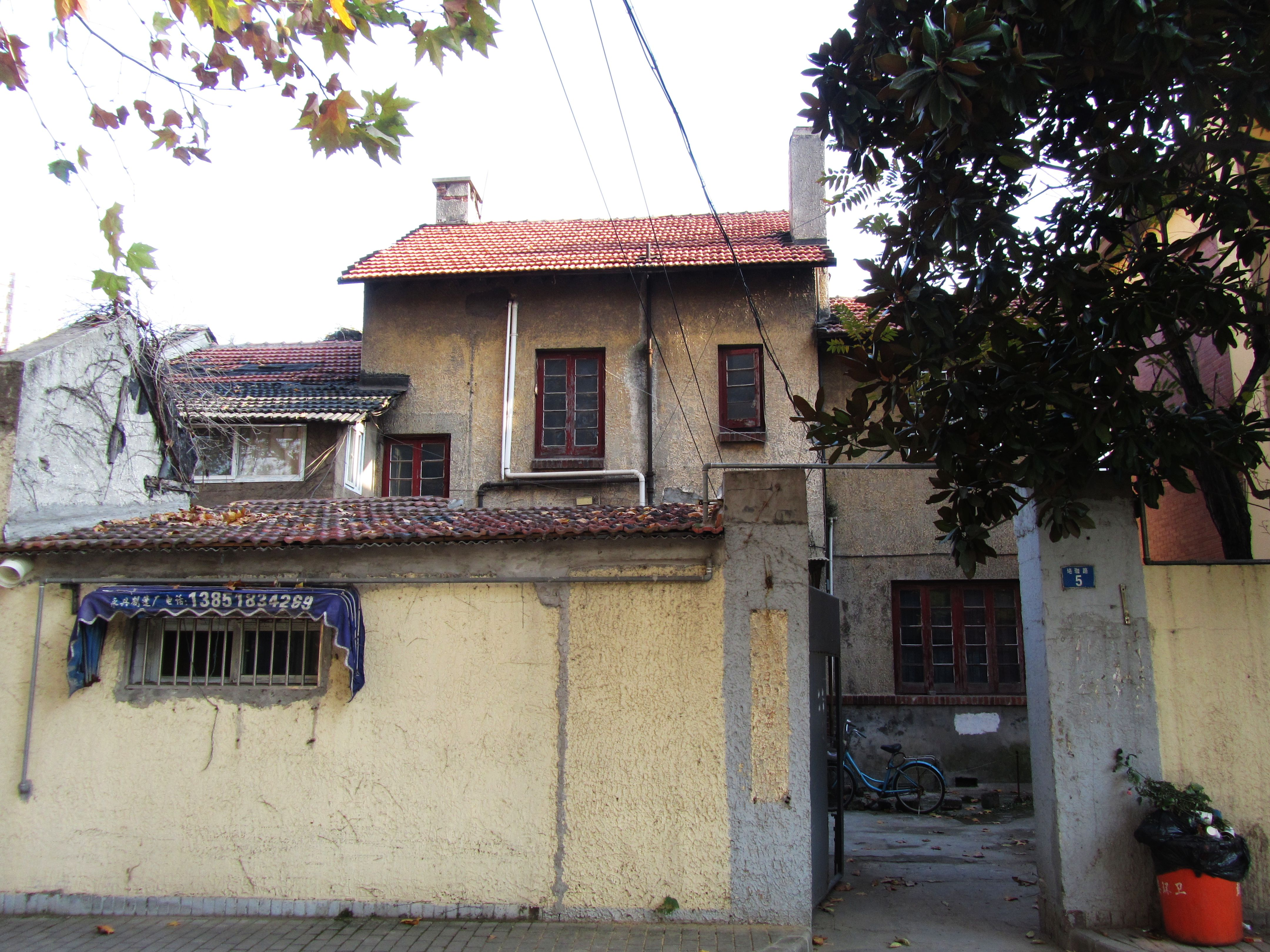
Former residence of Tang Enbo in Nanjing.

Born in 1899 in Wuyi, Zhejiang, Tang Enbo was a graduate of the Imperial Japanese Army Academy, and therefore was familiar with the tactics of his Japanese enemy during the Second Sino-Japanese War. Tang's early resistance to the Japanese invasion was most ineffective, due to the political situation in China— Tang's superior Chiang Kai-shek was reluctant to devote his best troops to fight the Japanese invaders, wishing instead to use them to exterminate the Communists. Limited in troops and material, any commander would have had great difficulties in fighting such a superior enemy, and Tang Enbo was no exception.

Furthermore, the battle plans though successful on paper rarely materialized on the battlefield during this stage because local Chinese warlords were only interested in maintaining their forces and largely ignored Chiang Kai-shek's orders. Although Tang did contribute to the victory at Battle of Taierzhuang, he was unable to stop the Japanese assaults during the 1944 Battle of Henan-Hunan-Guangxi, losing 37 cities and towns within 36 days.

=== Chinese Civil War ===
After World War II, Tang Enbo participated in the struggle against the communists, who attempted to win Tang Enbo over. Tang was hesitant at the first due to his military failure in the Chinese Civil War, but soon his fourth concubine convinced him to firmly follow Chiang Kai-shek and stay with Kuomintang. As a result, Tang Enbo informed Chiang Kai-shek that his teacher and superior Chen Yi had asked him to turn to the communists and Chen was then arrested. Chen Yi was later executed at Machangding, Taipei, on June 18, 1950, and was buried in Wugu, Taipei County.

The fallout of all this was that Tang Enbo had now lost the trust of Chiang Kai-shek. Tang's position was further weakened when other Nationalist cadres such as Gu Zhenggang discovered and revealed to Chiang Kai-shek that during the Shanghai Campaign Tang was preparing to flee to Japan by asking his close associates Wang Wencheng (王文成) and Long Zuoliang (龙佐良) to seek out a home in Japan.

=== Death ===
On May 6, 1949, a close friend of Tang's wired half a million US dollars to an American friend's account, and subsequently, the money was sent via this account to Wang Wencheng and Long Zuoliang in Japan. In July, 1949, Wang Wencheng and Long Zuoliang purchased a mansion with 22 rooms in a Tokyo suburb. However, all of this was accidentally made public on February 2, 1950, when Reuters issued the news in Tokyo claiming that Chiang Kai-shek had purchased a mansion in a Tokyo suburb via a top ranking Chinese official. It was rumored that Tang's political enemies within the Kuomintang had long been tracking Tang's every move and waited for the right opportunity to bring him down, but such a claim has yet to be confirmed. The result was Tang's complete falling out of favor with Chiang, who reportedly angrily shouted: "No wonder our defeat was so rapid in Shanghai and the southeastern coast— he (Tang Enbo) was already prepared to flee!"

After fleeing to Taiwan with the retreating Republic of China government, Tang Enbo became ill and was sent to Japan for treatment. However, Tang died on June 29, 1954, after a medical accident that occurred during surgery in Tokyo.

== Military career ==
- 1932 General Officer Commanding 89th Division, Henan
- 1937 Commander in Chief Taiyuan Pacification Headquarters' Frontline Forces
- 1937 - 1938 General Officer Commanding XIII Corps
- 1937 - 1938 General Officer Commanding 20th Army
- 1938 - 1940 Commander in Chief 31st Army Group
- 1944 Deputy Commander in Chief 1st War Area
- 1944 Deputy Commander in Chief 4th War Area
- 1944 - 1945 Commander in Chief 3rd Front Army
- 1949 Commander in Chief defense of Shanghai
