= Zhang Zizhong =

Chinese general and politician (1891–1940)

- 張自忠
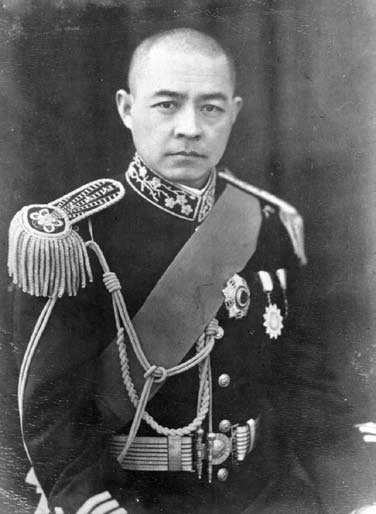
- Zhang Zizhong
- Born: August 11, 1891; Linqing, Shandong, China
- Died: May 16, 1940 (aged 48); Yicheng, Hubei, China
- Military career
- Allegiance: Republic of China
- Branch: National Revolutionary Army
- Service years: 1914–1940
- Rank: General
- Units: 25 Division; 38 Division; 59 Division
- Commands: 33rd Army Group; Third Division
- Conflicts: Second World War; Battle of Taierzhuang; Battle of Wuhan; Battle of Yichang †

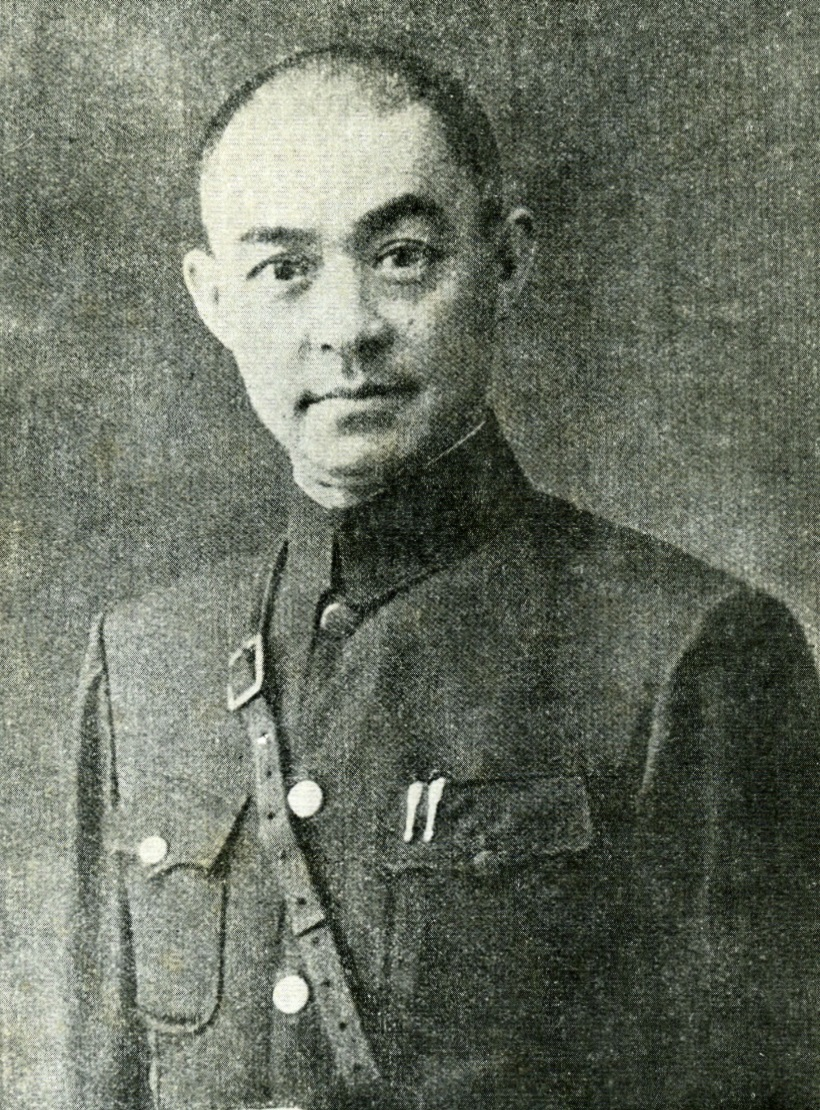
Zhang Zizhong

Zhang Zizhong (traditional Chinese: 張自忠; simplified Chinese: 张自忠; pinyin: Zhāng Zìzhōng; Wade–Giles: Chang Tzu-chung; August 11, 1891 – May 16, 1940) was a Chinese general of the National Revolutionary Army (NRA) of the Republic of China during the Second World War. Born in Linqing, Shandong, he was the highest-ranked officer and the only Army group commander of the NRA to die in the war. He was killed-in-action during the Battle of Yichang after refusing to retreat from the front lines. He showed great valor in the field and was regarded as one of the most valiant and respectable Chinese generals by the Imperial Japanese Army during the Second Sino-Japanese War. Because he was lieutenant general with the effective rank of full general at the time of his death, and was posthumously promoted to full general, he was also one of the highest-ranked Allied officers killed in action in World War II. His mausoleum is situated in Beibei District, Chongqing. There are roads named after him in Shanghai, Beijing, Tianjin, Wuhan and Taoyuan City.

== Career timeline ==
- 1911: Studied law in Tianjin
- 1914: Assigned to the 20th Army Division near Fengtian (present day Shenyang) as platoon leader
- 1935–1936: Chairman of the Government of Chahar Province
- 1937: Mayor of Tianjin
- 1937: General Officer Commanding 38th Division
- 1937–1940: General Officer Commanding LIX Corps
- 1938: General Officer commanding the 27th Army
- 1939: Commander in Chief Right Flank Army 5th War Area
- 1939–1940: Commander in Chief 33rd Army Group
- 1940: Killed in Action at Mount Chang near Yichang, Hubei
- 1940: Posthumous promotion to Full General

== Death ==
General Zhang Zizhong, commander of the eight divisions that constituted the Chinese 33rd Army Group, was killed at approximately 4:00 p.m. on May 16, 1940, in fighting at Shilichangshan ('Ten li mountain') near Nanguadian in Northern Hubei. The battle was one engagement of the Zaoyang-Yichang campaign that rumbled through late spring of that year. Surrounded by the Japanese, his forces had refused either to retreat or to surrender. In the ensuing hand-to-hand combat, General Zhang had been wounded seven times in all, by grenade, bullet, and finally by bayonet. The victorious Japanese realized Zhang's identity only when a major discovered, in the left breast pocket of his blood-soaked yellow uniform, a fine gold pen engraved with his name. The major quickly summoned senior officers; they ordered a stretcher brought and the body was carried away from the battlefield. (This was observed, through half-opened eyes, by Zhang's long-time associate, the Chinese major Ma Xiaotang, who lay nearby, bleeding from a bayonet wound, and who later gasped out the story to Chinese as he died.)

== See also ==
- Military history of China
- History of the Republic of China
- Kuomintang
- Second Sino-Japanese War
- World War II
- Marco Polo Bridge Incident
- Battle of Tai'erzhuang
- Battle of Wuhan
