= Cai Guo-Qiang =

Chinese installation artist

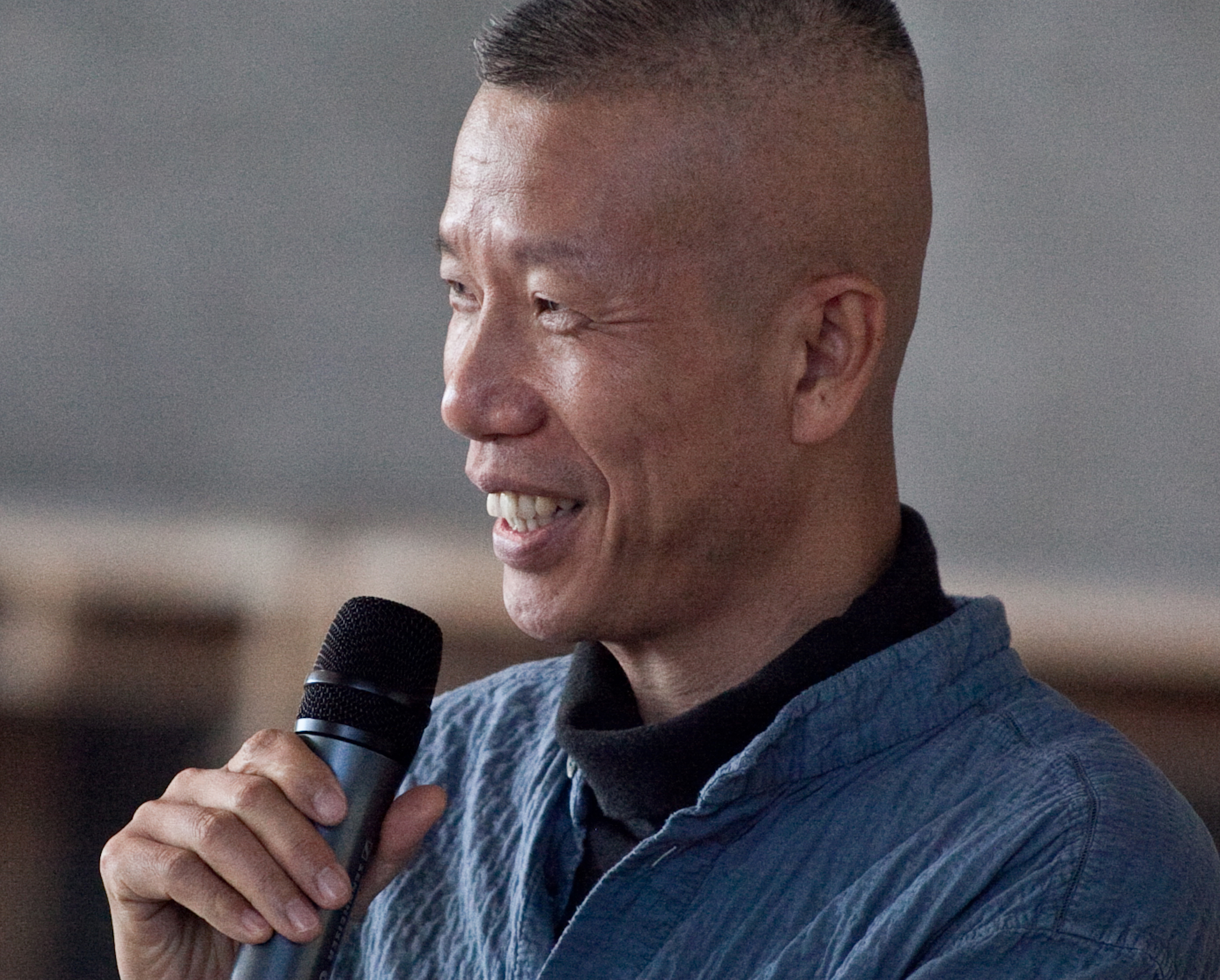
- Cai in October 2010
- Born: December 8, 1957 (age 68); Quanzhou, Fujian, China
- Education: Shanghai Theatre Academy
- Movement: Contemporary art
- Awards: Golden Lion, 48th Venice Biennale (1999); Alpert Awards in the Arts (2001); Fukuoka Asian Culture Prize (2009)
- Website: www.caiguoqiang.com

Cai Guo-Qiang
- Traditional Chinese: 蔡國強
- Simplified Chinese: 蔡国强
Transcriptions
Standard Mandarin
- Hanyu Pinyin: Cài Gúoqiáng
- Wade–Giles: Ts'ai^{4} Kuo^{2}ch'iang^{2}
Southern Min
- Hokkien POJ: Chhòa Kok-kiông

Cai Guo-Qiang (Chinese: 蔡国强; pinyin: Cài Gúoqiáng; born 8 December 1957) is a Chinese artist living in the US. He primarily utilizes pyrotechnics, with gunpowder and fireworks at the center of many of his works. He is most notable for his 2008 involvement in the Beijing Olympics fireworks.

== Biography ==
Cai Guo-Qiang was born in 1957 in Quanzhou, Fujian Province, China. His father, Cai Ruiqin, was a calligrapher and traditional painter who worked in a bookstore. As a result, Cai Guo-Qiang was exposed early on to Western literature as well as traditional Chinese art forms.

As an adolescent and teenager, Cai witnessed the social effects of the Cultural Revolution first-hand, personally participating in demonstrations and parades himself. He grew up in a setting where explosions were common, whether they were the result of cannon blasts or celebratory fireworks. He also "saw gunpowder used in both good ways and bad, in destruction and reconstruction".

In his late teens and early twenties, Cai Guo-Qiang acted in two martial art films, The Spring and Fall of a Small Town and Real Kung Fu of Shaolin. Later intrigued by the modernity of Western art forms such as oil painting, he studied stage design at the Shanghai Theater Academy from 1981 to 1985. The experience allowed him a more comprehensive understanding of stage practices and a much-heightened sense for theater, spatial arrangements, interactivity, and teamwork.

== Artwork ==
Cai Guo-Qiang's practice draws on a variety of symbols, narratives, traditions and materials. These include fengshui, Chinese medicine, shanshui paintings, science, flora and fauna, portraiture, and fireworks. Much of his work draws on Maoist/Socialist concepts for content, especially his gunpowder drawings, which strongly reflect Mao Zedong's tenet "destroy nothing, create nothing." Cai has said: “In some sense, Mao Zedong influenced all artists from our generation with his utopian romance and sentiment." Cai was among the first artists to contribute to discussions of Chinese art as a viable intellectual narrative with its own historical context and theoretical framework.

=== Early work ===
Cai's work is mainly inspired by traditional Chinese culture. It also draws from political topics. As a student, Cai made works consisting of stick-figure or abstract patterns in oil and burnt gunpowder. This giving him a place in the experimental ferment preceding the '85 New Wave. However, Cai moved to Japan in 1986 as the movement was building.

=== Projects for Extraterrestrials ===
In 1990, Cai began Projects for Extraterrestrials, which consisted of using large fireworks and extensive trails of blazing gunpowder that span across landscapes and building surfaces. Site-specific, the projects were implemented in various locations throughout the world. Project to Extend the Great Wall of China by 10,000 Meters: Project for Extraterrestrials No. 10 (1993) was representative of the nature of the projects as a whole, as it involved an approximately six-mile-long gunpowder fuse that extended beyond the western end of the Great Wall at the edge of the Gobi Desert. The fuse burned for about 15 minutes after it was lit, creating a dragon-like pattern across the dunes that was indicative of China's imperial and mythological heritage. The title for the series refers to Cai's inspiration for the project: the belief in a need for a new, higher perspective in which celebrations of pure energy replace earthly conflicts, and gunpowder, the "material fuel" of such conflict, becomes a system that delivers beauty and joy.

=== Gunpowder works ===
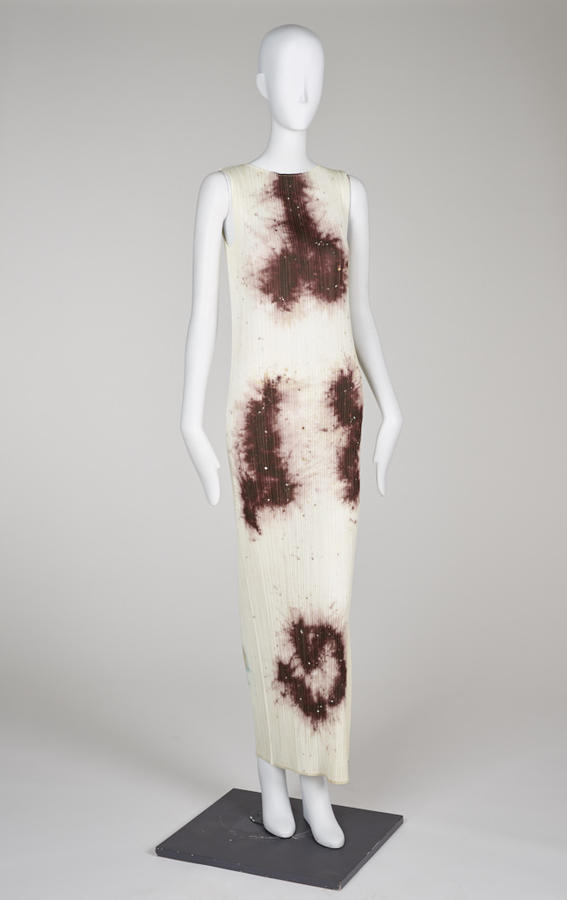
Gunpowder Dress by Cai Guo-Qiang for Issey Miyake, printed polyester, 1998. (RISD Museum)

Cai initially began working in 1995, he explored the properties of gunpowder in his drawings, an inquiry that eventually led to his experimentation with explosives on a massive scale and the development of his signature "explosion events". In 1995, he moved to New York with a grant from the New York-based Asian Cultural Council, an international organization that promotes artistic exchanges between Asian countries and the United States.

In 1998, Cai worked with fashion designer Issey Miyake on a one-off collection for Miyake's Guest Artist series. For it, Cai arranged gunpowder on white garments in the form of dragons symbolizing life, and set fire to the powder to burn the images into the clothes. Miyake then had the images reproduced as fabric prints for his Pleats Please line.

=== Inopportune installations ===
In 2004, Cai Guo-Qiang installed Inopportune: Stage One and Inopportune: Stage Two at the Massachusetts Museum of Contemporary Art (MASS MoCA). The piece was duplicated in 2008 at the Guggenheim Museum in New York. MASS MoCA describes the installation as such:

Nine cars arced through the 300 foot long gallery, tumbling and suspended in mid-air as if by stop-action. Long transparent rods radiated from the car, pulsing with dazzling multicolored light. An explosive moment, expanded in time and space as if in a dream, the cars formed the centerpiece of Inopportune by Cai Guo Qiang.

An adjacent gallery opened for the installation housed Inopportune: Stage 2, in which nine realistic tigers also hovered in the air, each one pierced by hundreds of arrows. The imagery in this gallery referred to the famous 13th-century Chinese story epitomizing bravery, in which a man named Wu Song rescued a village by slaying a man-eating tiger. In yet a third space, a phantom car bristling with fireworks floated like a ghost through the glittering illusion of Times Square at night.

Engaging images of our unsettled world, Inopportune created a theatrical, psychologically charged space in which to reflect on some of the most pressing dilemmas and contradictions affecting us such as terrorism and cultural, religious conflict, violence and beauty, the meaning of heroism.

— MASS MoCA, Massachusetts Museum of Contemporary Art

Inopportune: Stage One (2004) is also featured in the main entrance of the Seattle Art Museum.

=== 2008 Beijing Summer Olympics ===
Cai was commissioned by the International Olympic Committee and the Beijing Organizing Committee to produce work for the Games of the XXIX Olympiad, the 2008 Beijing Summer Olympics. Cai, who served as the director of visual and special effects at the 2008 Summer Olympics, created fireworks performances for both the opening and closing ceremonies, including the controversial "Footprints of History: Fireworks Project for the Opening Ceremony."

=== City of Flowers in the Sky ===
As a tribute to the center of the Italian Renaissance, Cai Guo-Qiang created an explosive depiction of flowers using fireworks across the blue skies of Florence, Italy, as his canvas, on November 18, 2018. The performance art piece lasted about ten minutes on Piazzale Michelangelo overlooking the city. During the event, which was inspired by Botticelli's "Primavera," 50,000 custom-made fireworks released smoke that resembled thousands of flowers. The spectacle introduced the Cai's solo exhibition, Flora Commedia: Cai Quo-Qiang at the Uffizi.

=== WE ARE: Explosion Event for PST ART ===
On September 15, 2024, Cai Guo-Qiang created and choreographed a daytime fireworks event, “WE ARE: Explosion Event for PST ART,” at the Los Angeles Memorial Coliseum to kickoff the PST ART: Art & Science Collide festival, a five-month, multi-venue event funded by more than $20 million in gifts from the Getty Foundation. For PST (previously known as Pacific Standard Time), Cai designed “WE ARE” in collaboration with his proprietary AI model cAI™ that gathers information and data from his artworks, archives, and areas of interest.

At the “WE ARE” event, the first pyrotechnic event in U.S. history to feature more than one thousand aerial drones armed with fireworks, several people were injured by falling debris and scrap materials from the drones and fireworks. Approximately 4,000 to 4,500 guests stood on the Coliseum’s playing field to watch the fiery and smoky production that triggered several loud blasts in and around the stadium and the neighboring USC campus. It is unknown how many spectators were injured from the blasts and falling debris. Cai, who may be best known his work for the 2008 Beijing Summer Olympics, has not responded to media requests for information concerning what went wrong during his fireworks show.

In addition to the fireworks display, the Getty, the wealthiest arts organization in the world, has planned “Cai Guo-Qiang: A Material Odyssey,” an exhibition at the USC Pacific Asia Museum to survey Cai’s gunpowder art. Cai’s exhibit and fireworks performance are funded by Eva and Ming Hsieh, Co-Founders of Fulgent Genetics; Peggy Cherng and Andrew Cherng, Co-Chairs and Co-CEOs of Panda Express; the Getty Patron Program; Yan Luo, Ellen and Dominic Ng, Haiyan Ren, and Sophia and Anqiang Zhang.

=== The Ascending Dragon ===
On September 19, 2025, Cai's The Ascending Dragon, a piece related to the 1989 gunpowder drawing Ascending Dragon: Project for Extraterrestrials No. 2, received significant public backlash due to potential environmental harm. Fireworks emitted colored smoke on a plateau in Shigatse in the Tibet Autonomous Region, which is one of the world's most fragile ecosystems in the world. The performance was staged at an elevation approximately 18,000 feet above sea level.

The Ascending Dragon was part of a promotional campaign for Arc'teryx. Although organizers claimed that described the show used "used biodegradable, environmentally friendly materials" and that all stock herds had been relocated, no environmental assessment was completed prior to the event. Arc'teryx issued a public apology and stated that it would work with an external agency to assess the project's impact. Cai issued a public statement in the Chinese media, reading: “My studio and I attach great importance to this and humbly accept all criticism of our artistic creation on the plateau with a modest heart and sincerely thank you for your concern and reminders.”

=== Other ===
In an interview in The Brooklyn Rail, Cai said of his piece Light Cycle, commissioned by Creative Time in 2003: "Because this was a post 9/11 New York I wanted to provide an anchor and reference point for people to feel hope. That is why I picked the reservoir in Central Park and made a full circle. It is kind of a protection, a symbol for comfort and fullness."

Cai is one of the most well-known and influential Chinese contemporary artists, having represented his country at the Venice Biennale in 1999 with his project Venice's Rent Collection Courtyard, a time-based sculpture which he had artisans recreate the Rent Collection Courtyard, a work of Socialist Realist propaganda sculpture. Cai returned to Venice in 2005 to curate the Chinese pavilion.

His work has also attracted controversy. Venice's Rent Collection Courtyard drew condemnation within China from the original authors of the Socialist Realist sculpture for destroying their "spiritual property." Some critics have asserted that while his work references politics and philosophy, he seems to switch positions at will and that the references seem relatively opportunistic.

In response to the critical backlash against his appropriation in the "Venice Rent Collection Courtyard," Cai has said in an interview in The Brooklyn Rail:

My idea of making this work is not to do any criticism or replication but to focus on what it means for sculptors to create realist sculptures in the time the work was created. ...The end goal is not to make perfect sculptures and have them exhibited elsewhere and then have them collected somewhere. The key is to focus on the process of fabrication of these artworks, to pay attention to the process of the artists making these sculptures, rather than where these sculptures will end up and how they will look in the end.

From May 2–September 25, 2010, Cai was featured in the solo exhibition Cai Guo-Qiang: Peasant Da Vincis, which presented works from peasants in China. This includes homemade airplanes, helicopters, submarines, and robots.

Cai also created Odyssey, a permanent gunpowder drawing for the Museum of Fine Arts, Houston in Fall 2010. Installed as part of the museum's ongoing Portal Project and stretching across forty-two panels, it is one of his largest gunpowder drawings to date. Another solo exhibition, 'Cai Guo-Qiang – 1040M Underground, was on view at the new foundation IZOLYATSIA. Platform for Cultural Initiatives in Donetsk, Ukraine through the fall of 2011.

In December 2011, Cai Guo-Qiang: Saraab opened at Mathaf: Arab Museum of Modern Art in Doha, Qatar - the artist's largest since his 2008 retrospective at the Guggenheim Museum and his first solo exhibition ever in a Middle Eastern country. Saraab (mirage in Arabic) features more than fifty works, including seventeen newly commissioned pieces, thirty recent works and nine documentary videos. The exhibition opened on December 5th with Black Ceremony, the artist's largest ever daytime explosion event and includes several large-scale site-specific installations. In 2016, he curated What About the Art? Contemporary Art from China at Al Riwaq in Doha.

In 2012, Cai’s “Mystery Circle: Explosion Event,” featured 40,000 mini rockets that blasted for approximately two minutes at the Museum of Contemporary Art (MOCA) in Los Angeles.

In 2016, Cai was tasked with designing the Berggruen Philosophy Prize's trophy.

Cai's work was featured in the 2016 Netflix documentary Sky Ladder: The Art of Cai Guo-Qiang, highlighting his work with fireworks, particularly his 1,650-foot ladder of gunpowder.

Cai was highlighted in the 2018 BBC series Civilisations, episode 9, "The Vital Spark" in which he was interviewed by Simon Schama, as an artist offering inspiration for our time. During this episode, Cai demonstrates the process of gunpowder art, by creating the two new works: Heaven Complex No. 1 and No. 2 (2017).

Cai is one of six artist-curators who made selections for Artistic License: Six Takes on the Guggenheim Collection, on view at the Solomon R. Guggenheim Museum from May 24, 2019, through January 12, 2020.

From September 26 to November 9, 2025, the White Cube Bermondsey, exhibited “Cai Guo-Qiang Gunpowder and Abstraction 2015–2025.”

== Awards ==
He was selected as a finalist for the 1996 Hugo Boss Prize and won the 48th Venice Biennale International Golden Lion Prize and 2001 CalArts/Alpert Award in the Arts. In 2008, he was subject to a large-scale mid-career retrospective, I Want To Believe, at the Solomon R. Guggenheim Museum in New York, which eventually traveled to the National Art Museum of China in Beijing and the Guggenheim Museum in Bilbao. He also gained widespread attention as the director of visual and special effects for the opening and closing ceremonies of the 2008 Summer Olympics in Beijing. In October 2012, he was awarded the Praemium Imperiale in Tokyo as the first Chinese national Laureate. In May 2022, he was awarded the John D. Rockefeller III Award by the Asian Cultural Council alongside violinist and educator Midori. The John D. Rockefeller 3rd Award is given to individuals from Asia or the U.S. who have made significant contributions to the international understanding, practice, or study of the visual or performing arts of Asia.

== Personal life ==
Cai moved from Beijing to New York in 1995, but as of 2017, he continues to maintain a separate house in the former. In the mid-2010s, he made his gunpowder paintings at the Fireworks by Grucci factory in Bellport, New York. His Manhattan studio was renovated by Rem Koolhaas's Office for Metropolitan Architecture. Cai intends for it to eventually become a foundation with public viewing. Unlike his prior studios, he sought a property where he would work and live with his family, fulfilling a goal to combine his personal and professional lives.

Cai purchased a former horse farm in Chester, New Jersey, in 2011 from an Olympic equestrian. The property was redesigned by architect Frank Gehry and his former student Trattie Davies. They converted the barn into a 14,000-square-foot studio, the stables into archives, and its hayloft into an exhibition space. Cai first met Gehry in 2009 at his Guggenheim Bilbao solo show, and their friendship included a 2013 trip to Cai's hometown of Quanzhou to propose a contemporary art museum. The two began work on Cai's Chester property soon after he purchased it. The 9,700-square-foot house is built outward from the original, stone core structure in glass and sequoia. At Cai's request, the titanium roofing curls at their edges, like flying carpets. The house has multiple small balconies. Cai lives in the Chester house with his wife and two daughters.

== Selected solo exhibitions and projects ==
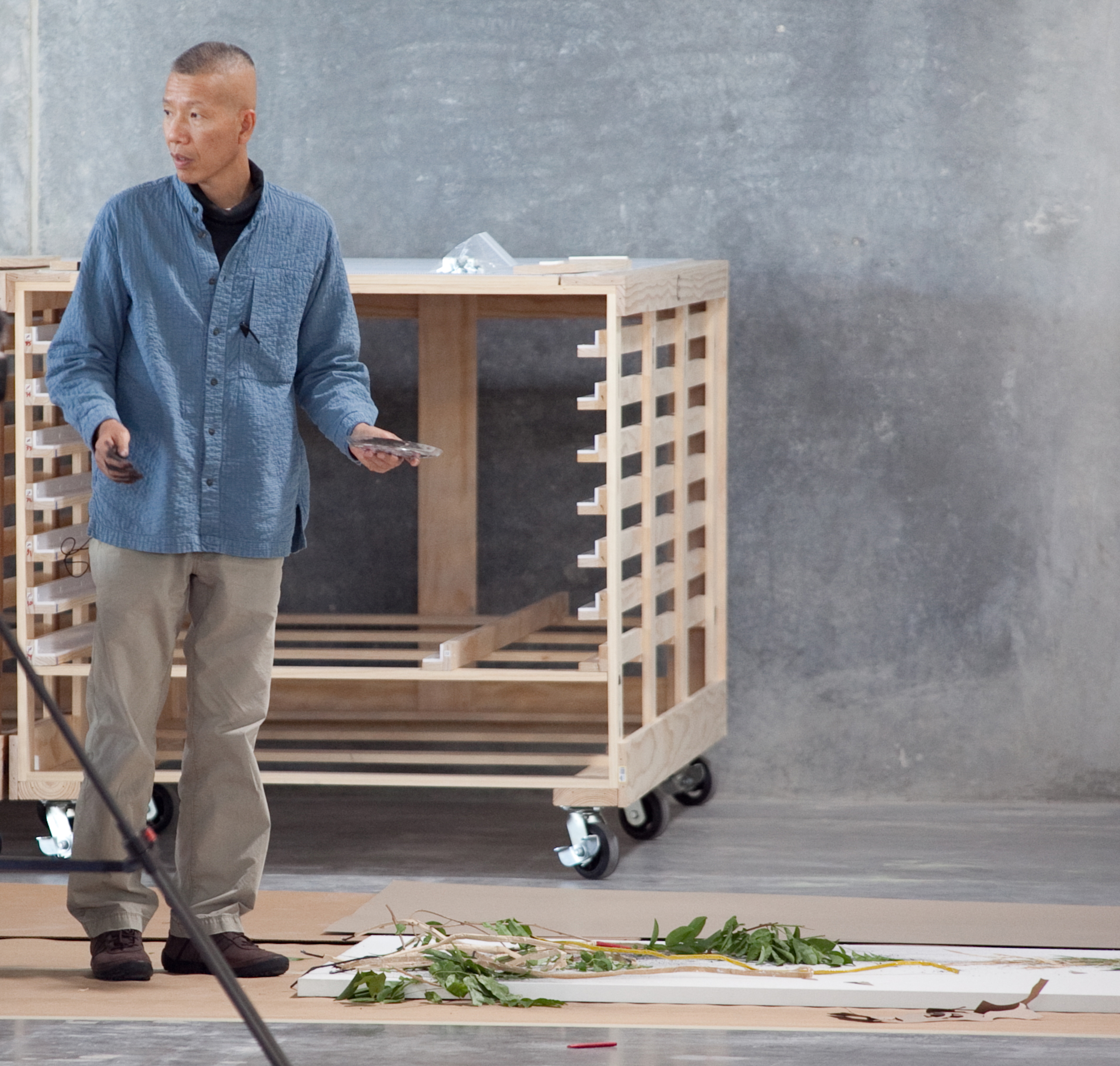
Guo-Qiang preparing a gunpowder drawing for the Arts of China Gallery at the Houston Museum of Fine Arts in October 2010

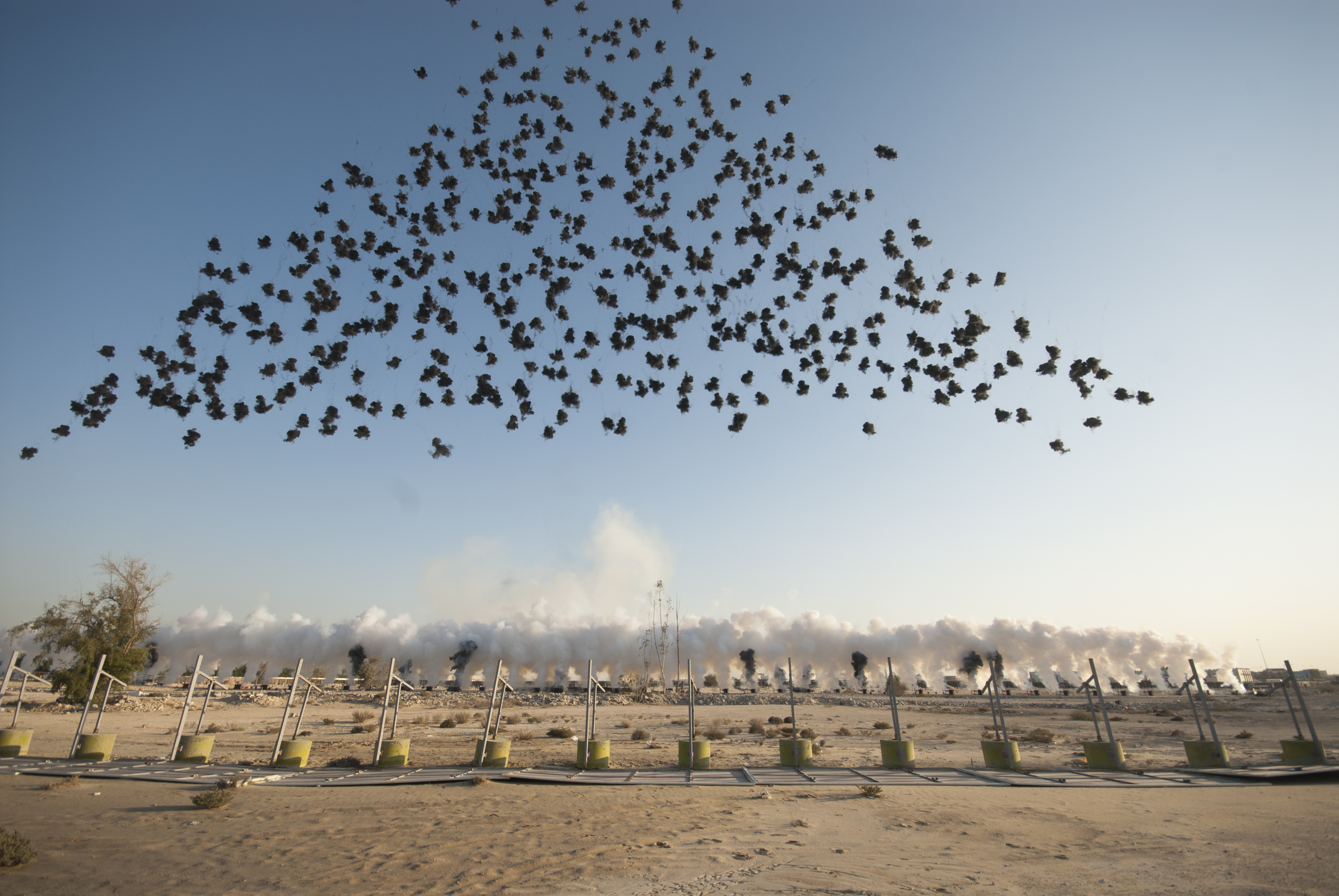
"Triangle" in Doha, Qatar on 5 December 2011

- In 2023, the National Art Center, Tokyo presented Cai's large-scale solo exhibition Ramble in the Cosmos—From Primeval Fireball Onward.
- Flora Commedia: Cai Guo-Qiang at the Uffizi, City of Florence, November 2018-February 2019
- Cai Guo Qiang: A Clan of Boats, Faurschou Foundation, Copenhagen, Denmark, 2012
- Cai Guo-Qiang: Sky Ladder, Museum of Contemporary Art, Los Angeles, California, 2012
- Cai Guo-Qiang: Saraab, Mathaf: Arab Museum of Modern Art, Doha, Qatar, 2011
- Cai Guo-Qiang: Resplandor y Soledad. Museo Universitario de Arte Contemporáneo (MUAC), Ciudad Universitaria, Universidad Nacional Autónoma de México (UNAM). 2011
- Cai Guo-Qiang : fallen blossoms, Philadelphia Museum of Art, Philadelphia, Pennsylvania, 2010
- Cai Guo-Qiang: Hanging Out in the Museum , Taipei Fine Arts Museum, Taipei, 2009
- Cai Guo-Qiang: I Want to Believe, Solomon R. Guggenheim Museum, New York City, 2008; Guggenheim Museum Bilbao, 2009
- Inopportune: Stage One and Illusion, Seattle Art Museum, Seattle, 2007
- Cai Guo-Qiang on the Roof: Transparent Monument, Metropolitan Museum of Art Roof Garden, New York City, 2006
- Arte all'Arte, Colle di Val d'Elsa, 2005
- Curated the first China Pavilion at the 51st Venice Biennale, 2005
- Tornado: Explosion Project for the Festival of China, Kennedy Center for the Performing Arts, 2005; Washington, D.C., 2005.
- Cai Guo-Qiang: Inopportune, Mass MoCA, North Adams, Massachusetts, 2005
- Cai Guo-Qiang: Traveler, Freer Gallery of Art and Arthur M. Sackler Gallery, and Hirshhorn Museum and Sculpture Garden at the Smithsonian Institution, Washington, D.C., 2004
- Organizing and curating BMoCA: Bunker Museum of Contemporary Art, Kinmen, Taiwan, 2004
- Light Cycle: Explosion Project for Central Park, New York, 2003
- Ye Gong Hao Long: Explosion Project for Tate Modern, Tate Modern, London, 2003
- Transient Rainbow, Museum of Modern Art, New York, 2002;
- Cai Guo-Qiang, Shanghai Art Museum, Shanghai, 2002
- APEC Cityscape Fireworks Show, Asia Pacific Economic Cooperation, Shanghai, 2001
- Cai Guo-Qiang: An Arbitrary History, Musee d'art Contemporain Lyon, France, 2001
- Cai Guo-Qiang, Fondation Cartier pour l'art contemporain, Paris, 2000
- Cultural Melting Bath: Projects for the 20th Century, Queens Museum of Art, Queens, New York, 1997
- Flying Dragon in the Heavens, Louisiana Museum of Modern Art, Humblebaek, Denmark, 1997
- The Century with Mushroom Clouds: Project for the 20th Century, New York, 1996
- The Earth Has Its Black Hole Too, Hiroshima, Japan, 1994
- Project to Extend the Great Wall of China by 10,000 Meters, Jiayuguan City, China, 1993.

== Selected bibliography ==
- Dana Friis-Hansen, Octavio Zaya, Serizawa Takashi, Cai Guo-Qiang, Phaidon, London, 2002. ISBN 9780714840758
