= Li Gang =

Li Gang is the name of:

- Li Gang (Song dynasty) (1083–1140), Song dynasty politician and general
- Li Gang (People's Armed Police) (zh:李刚 (武警); 1922–2001), first commander of the Chinese People's Armed Police
- Li Gang (politician, born 1955) (born 1955), Chinese official with the Macau Liaison Office
- Li Gang (politician, born 1965) (born 1965), Chinese politician who served as the head of the Discipline Inspection and Supervision Group of the Central Commission for Discipline Inspection and National Supervisory Commission (2024-2025)
- Li Gang (paleontologist) (born 1967), Chinese paleontologist
- Li Gang (footballer) (born 1981), Chinese association footballer

== See also ==
- Li Gang incident, 2010 scandal in China
- Ligang, a township in Pingtung County, Taiwan
