= Liu Wencai =

- 劉文彩
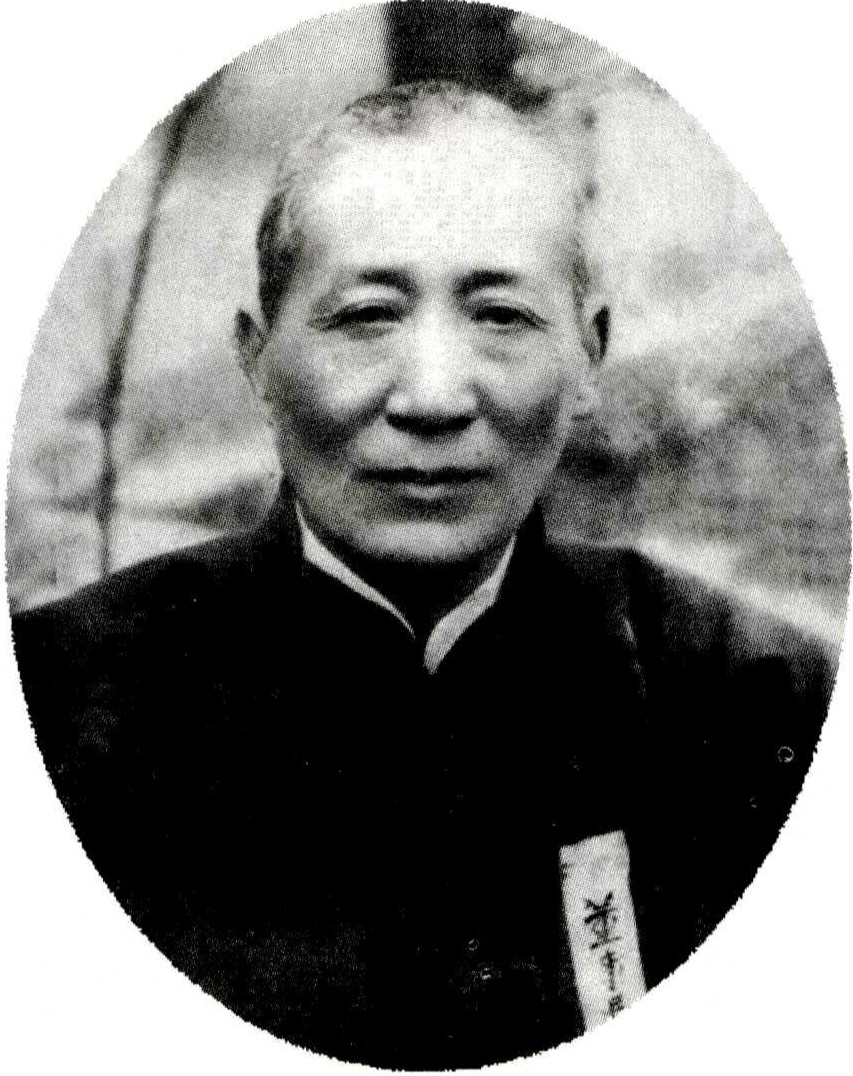
- Born: 1887
- Died: October 17, 1949 (aged 61–62)
- Other name: 星廷

Liu Wencai (simplified Chinese: 刘文彩; traditional Chinese: 劉文彩; 1887 - 17 October 1949) was a Chinese landlord from Sichuan province, and brother of the warlord Liu Wenhui. During the Cultural Revolution, he was depicted as the archetype of the exploiter of peasant farmers.

== Biography ==
Liu Wencai is considered one of the most colorful figures in the Sichuan province during the Republic of China (1912–49) period. He comes from a family of land owners and liquor merchants, and prospered under the patronage of influential family members in senior government positions. Liu had good relations with local politicians and military leaders, but was also said to have had connections with organized crime and secret societies. Under Liu, peasants were cheated in their lease so that they lived in a state of permanent debt. At the end of the lease, peasants are driven from their homes by Liu, with some being forced to sell their children, or recruited into the military. He died in 1949, shortly before the People's Liberation Army entered Sichuan.

== Reception ==
Liu Wencai was portrayed the archetypal villain of feudal societies by communist party propaganda since the 1950s, with publications of his supposed deeds being distributed throughout the country. The authenticity of Liu's stories are questionable, and it is difficult to separate established facts with propaganda. Since Liu Wencai is still seen as a controversial figure in China today, there is little independent research on his life. Liu's grandson Liu Xiaofei has sought to rehabilitate his grandfather's image, as having contributed positively to the education and economic development of Sichuan, as well as having built key infrastructures in Dayi County.

Liu's reputation remained even after the end of the Cultural Revolution in 1976. In 1999, Sichuan author Xiao Shu wrote a book "The Truth on Liu Wencai" (Liu Wencai zhenxiang) which contained a more positive evaluation of Liu that deviated significantly from the official portrayal, and as a result was withdrawn from sale. In 2003, the Hong Kong television station Phoenix TV broadcast a similar portrayal of Liu, but the program has been censored in mainland China, although it remained available on the internet. Xiao Shu has since published a new, freely available book on Liu Wencai. In English, one article has been published which partially discusses the demonization of Liu Wencai's image by the Chinese government and how his grandson Liu Xiaofei tried to rehabilitate his grandfather's reputation.

== Museum ==
The former residence of the Liu family in Dayi County was converted into a museum in 1958, and since 1980 has been listed as a historical site. It covers an area of 20,000 square meters, and houses an extensive collection of over 2,700 items, and more than 500 rooms.

It houses the 1965 sculpture Rent Collection Courtyard, a work of socialist realism which depicted Liu as an evil landlord collecting rent from poor peasants. The Museum has been research as a site of collective memory, class education, and tourist memorabilia.

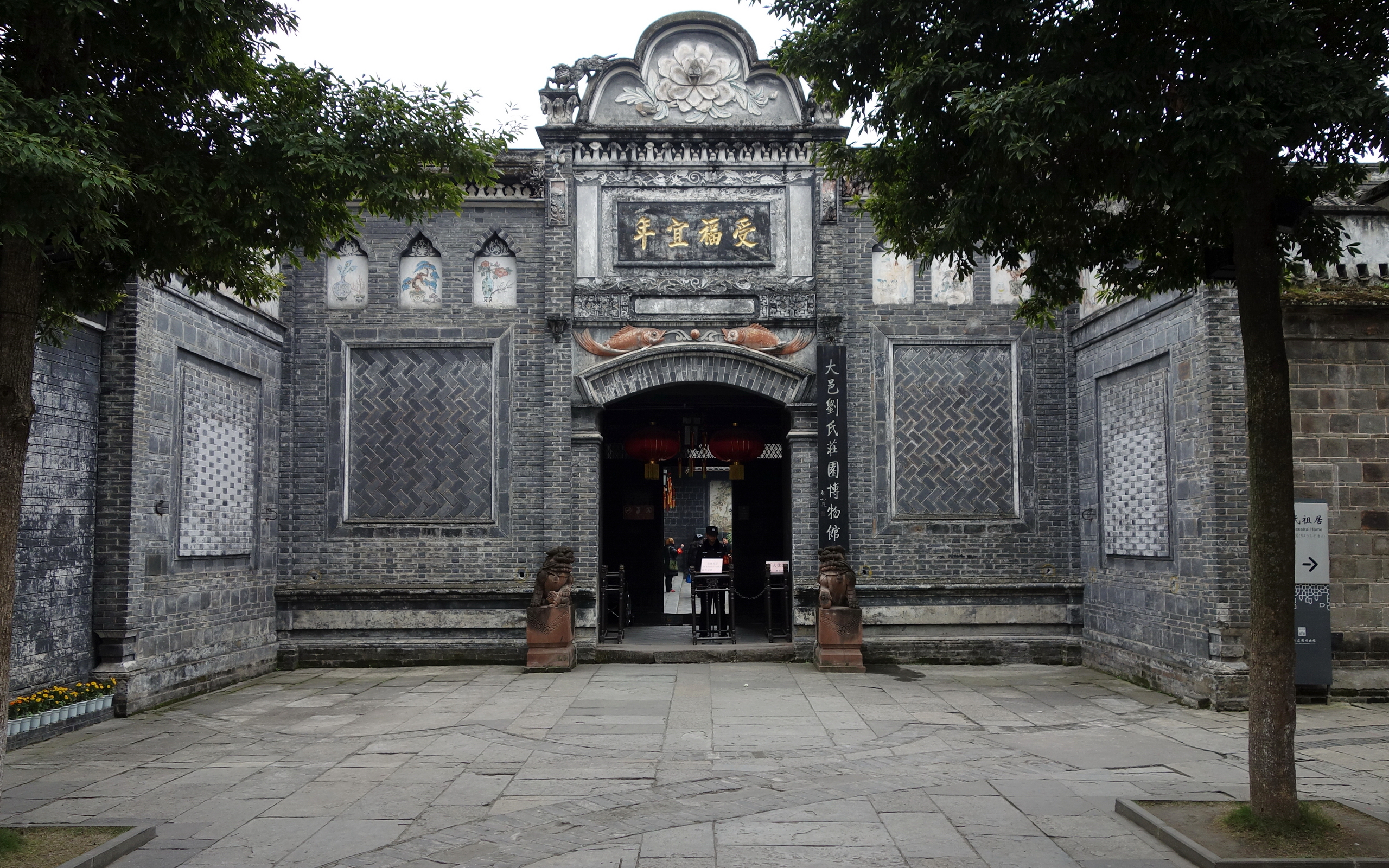
Liu Family Manor Museum

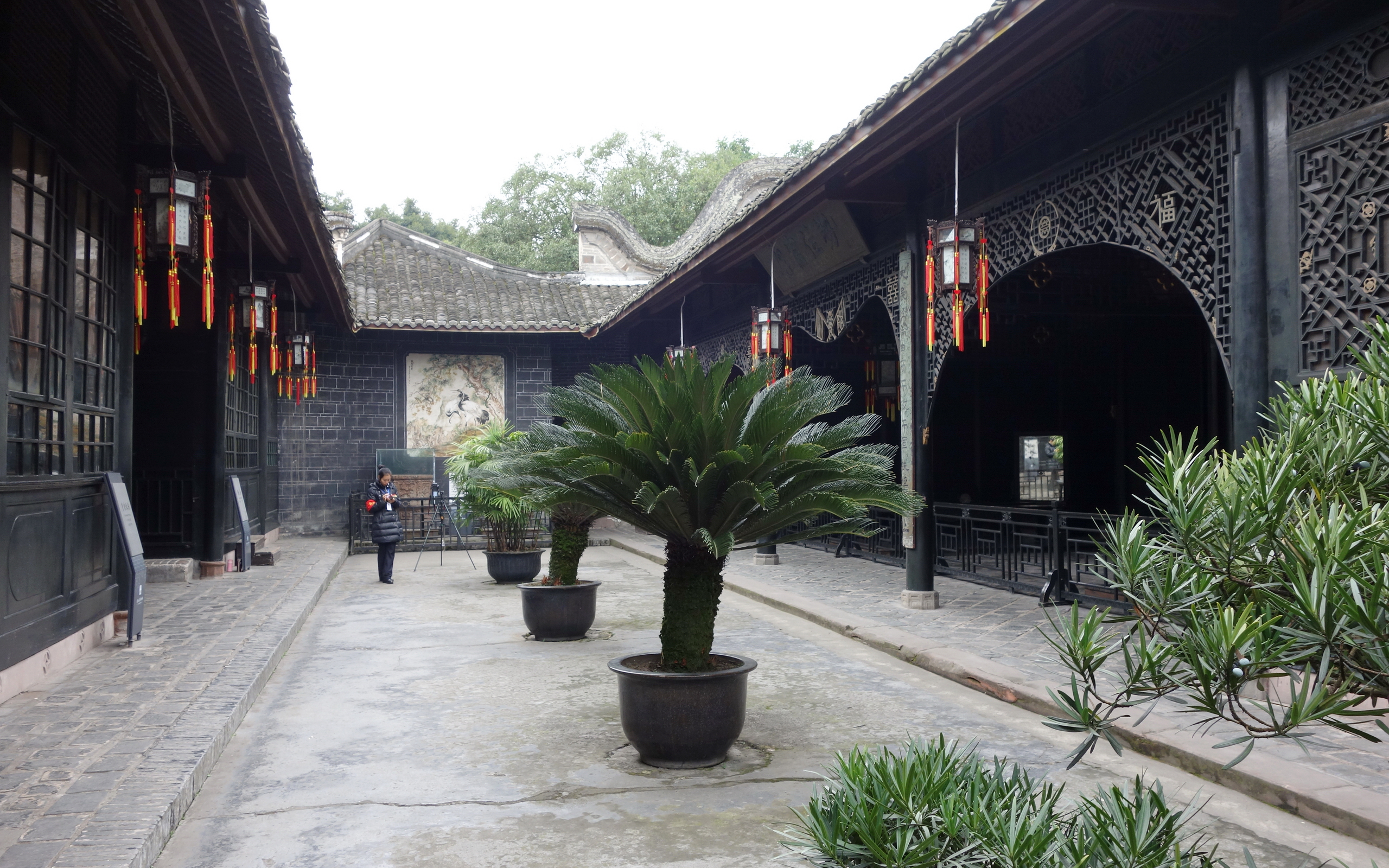
Liu Wencai residence

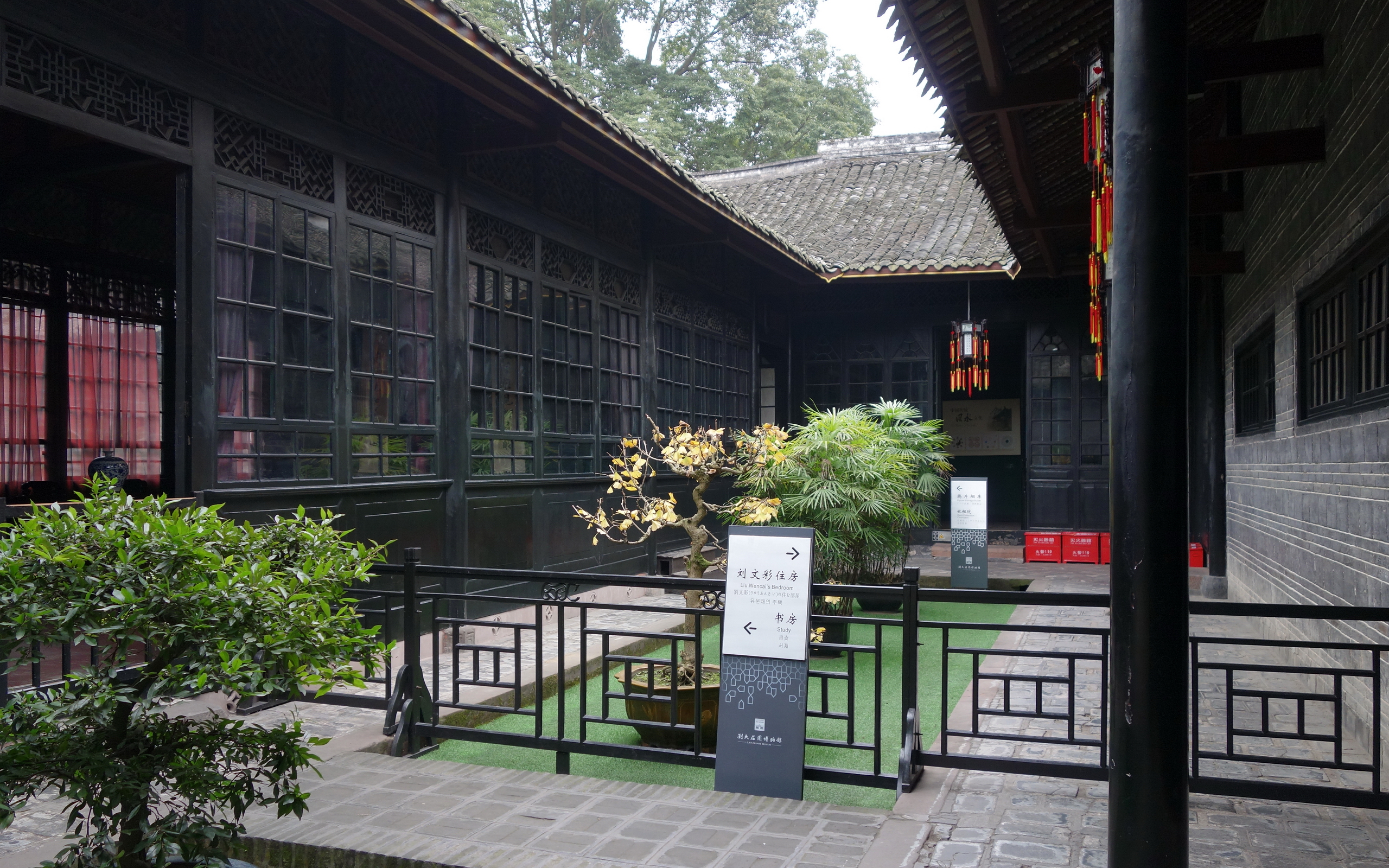
The study courtyard of Liu Wencai manor

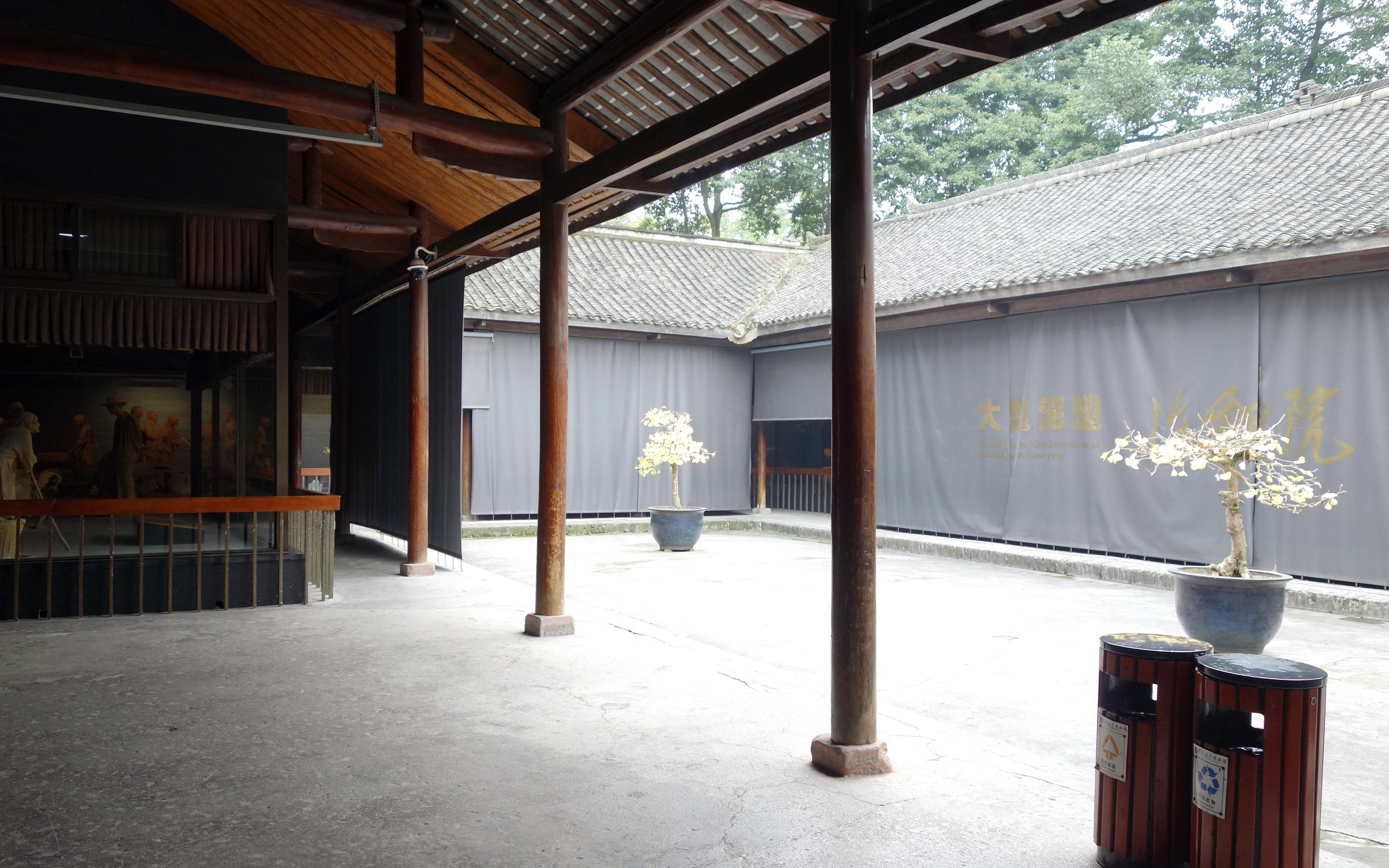
Rent Collection Courtyard exhibition
