= Xiao Shu =

Chen Min
- 陈敏
- Born: November 1962 (age 63); Yilong County, Nanchong, Sichuan, China
- Occupations: Editor, writer, commentator
- Writing career
- Pen name: Xiao Shu
- Language: Chinese
- Period: –present

Chinese name
- Simplified Chinese: 陈敏
- Traditional Chinese: 陳敏
Transcriptions
Standard Mandarin
- Hanyu Pinyin: Chén Mǐn

Chen Min (Chinese: 陈敏; born November 1962) is a Chinese famous writer, editor, commentator. He wrote under the pen name of Xiao Shu (Chinese: 笑蜀; pinyin: Xiào Shǔ).

== Biography ==
Chen Min was born in Yilong County, Sichuan in 1962. He graduated from Sun Yat-sen University. Chen worked on a series of non-fiction novels – History of the First Sound (历史的先声), The Truth of Liu Wencai (刘文彩真相). In 2000, his works have been suppressed. In 2005, he was expelled from Beijing. In 2011, he was dismissed from Southern Weekly.

== Works ==
- 《刘文彩真相》 (in Chinese). Xi'an, Shaanxi: Shaanxi Normal University Press. 1999. ISBN 978-7-5613-1974-1.
- 《历史的先声：半个世纪前的庄严承诺》 (in Chinese). Shantou, Guangdong: Shantou University Press. 1999. ISBN 9787810363457.
- 《背上十字架的科学：苏联遗传学劫难纪实》 (in Chinese). Guangzhou, Guangdong: Guangdong People's Publishing House. 2003. ISBN 7218042651.
- 《新史学：大地主刘文彩》 (in Chinese). Guangzhou, Guangdong: Guangdong People's Publishing House. 2011. ISBN 9787218060729.
