= Selina Maitreya =

American photographer and author

Caren Selina Maitreya (March 30, 1955), formerly known as Selina Oppenheim, is an international photography consultant and author. She has published two books, Portfolios that Sell: Professional Techniques for Presenting and Marketing Your Photographs (2003—Random House/Amphoto Books) and How to Succeed in Commercial Photography: Insights from a Leading Consultant (2007—Allworth Press). Karen Frank, the photo editor of O: The Oprah Magazine called Portfolios that Sell, "An absolute essential for the photographer creating his portfolio for the first time." The Boston Globe stated Portfolios that Sell is for "amateur photographers who want to enjoy their [photos] more." Selina has been consulting with hundreds of photographers for thirty years. She currently lives in Massachusetts.

== Early life ==
Selina was born Caren Linda Mellis to Julian and Harriette Mellis in The Bronx on March 30, 1955. She was raised in Bellport, New York. In 1974, after hitchhiking to Boston, Massachusetts, she became inspired by the works of Weegee and Diane Arbus. She later enrolled in the New England School of Photography under a two-year program.

== Career ==
Selina started as an agent for Al Fisher in 1978. In 1979, she was one of the founding members of the Boston Graphic Artists Guild. She later turned to consulting in 1981. Selina has lectured over a hundred times, often at events sponsored by The Canadian Association of Professional Image Creators, the American Photographic Artists Alliance and American Society of Media Photographers.

== Projects ==
=== The View from Here ===
'The View from Here' was the first audiobook to teach photographers how to develop a vision-based business. It had nine hours and twelve chapters of information, including sections on visual development, sales, and marketing. It became available for purchase in 2010.

=== Clarion Call ===
Clarion Call was the first free international online teleseminar for photographers. Selina brought on 21 separate experts and over 3,000 people attended. It aired in February 2011. The third Clarion Call will be taking place in the Spring of 2012.

=== The Photographer's Path ===
The Photographer's Path is a "12-month membership program that contains information and inspiration delivered via video and mp3 recordings.". Its inception was in 2011.

== Works ==
=== Books ===
Portfolios that Sell: Professional Techniques for Presenting and Marketing your Photographs (ISBN 978-0817455439)

How to Succeed in Commercial Photography: Insights from a Leading Consultant (ISBN 978-1581154917); an Amazon Best-Seller in the Summer of 2011.

=== Articles ===
"The Cheapest Tool" (2010)

"Marketing During the Summer Months" (2011)

"Practice 'Active' Listening" (2011)

"A Successful Photography Business - Define Your Vision and Create Your Positioning Statement" (2011)

"Why Photographers Fail..." (2011)

"Building Relationships as a Cash Flow Tool" (2011)

"A Successful Professional Photography Business Comes From Creating a Budget" (2011)

"The Gift of Focusing your Vision" (2011)

"No More Single Images, Please!" (2011)

"Turning the Page" (2011)

"For Professional Photographers - 5 Specific Steps to Help You Survive During Difficult Times" (2011)

"Lessons I've Learned" (2011)

"Habits of Highly Successful Photographers" (2012)

"Collaboration, are you Willing to Work for it?" (2012)

"The Client Perspective" (2012)

== Personal life ==
Selina lives in Acton, Massachusetts with her two sons, Jake and Sam.
