= Bellport Village Historic District =

Historic district in New York, United States

- U.S. National Register of Historic Places
- U.S. Historic district
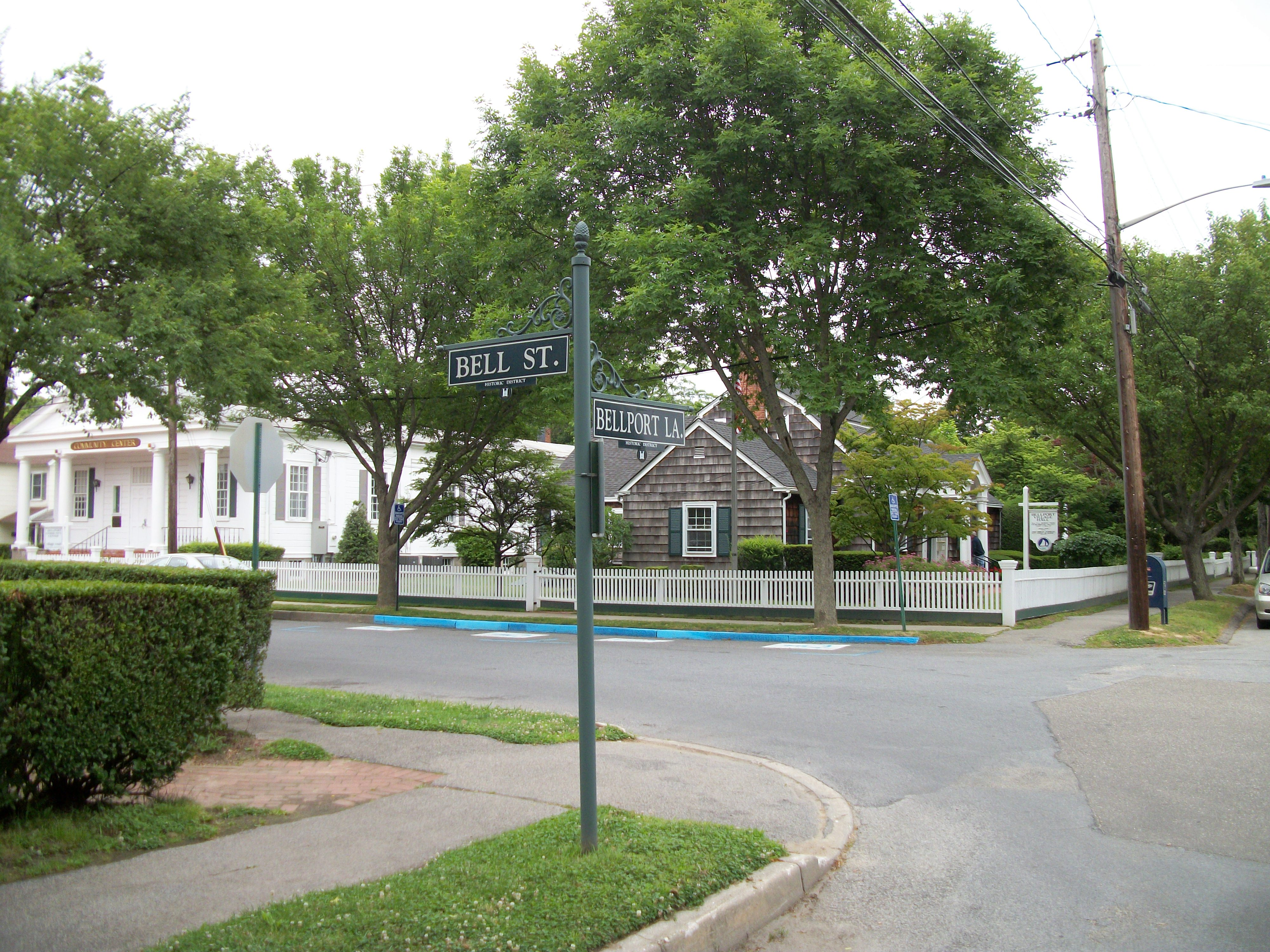
- The Bellport Village Hall, and Community Center to the left, barely a fraction of the Bellport Historic District.

- Location within New York Location within the United States
- Location: Roughly bounded by South Country Road, Bellport Lane, Brown's Lane, Brewster Lane, and Bell Street, Bellport, New York
- Coordinates: 40°45′29.87″N 72°56′12.46″W
- Area: 0 acres (0 ha)
- MPS: Village of Bellport MRA
- NRHP reference No.: 02001451
- Added to NRHP: July 4, 1980

Bellport Village Historic District, formerly known as the Bell Street Historic District, is a national historic district located at Bellport in Suffolk County, New York. Located within the district is the separately listed Bellport Academy. It also includes the Village Hall, Bellport Community Center, the former fire house, and a museum/exchange shop built in 1890, as well as other structures.

It was added to the National Register of Historic Places in 1980.

== Gallery ==
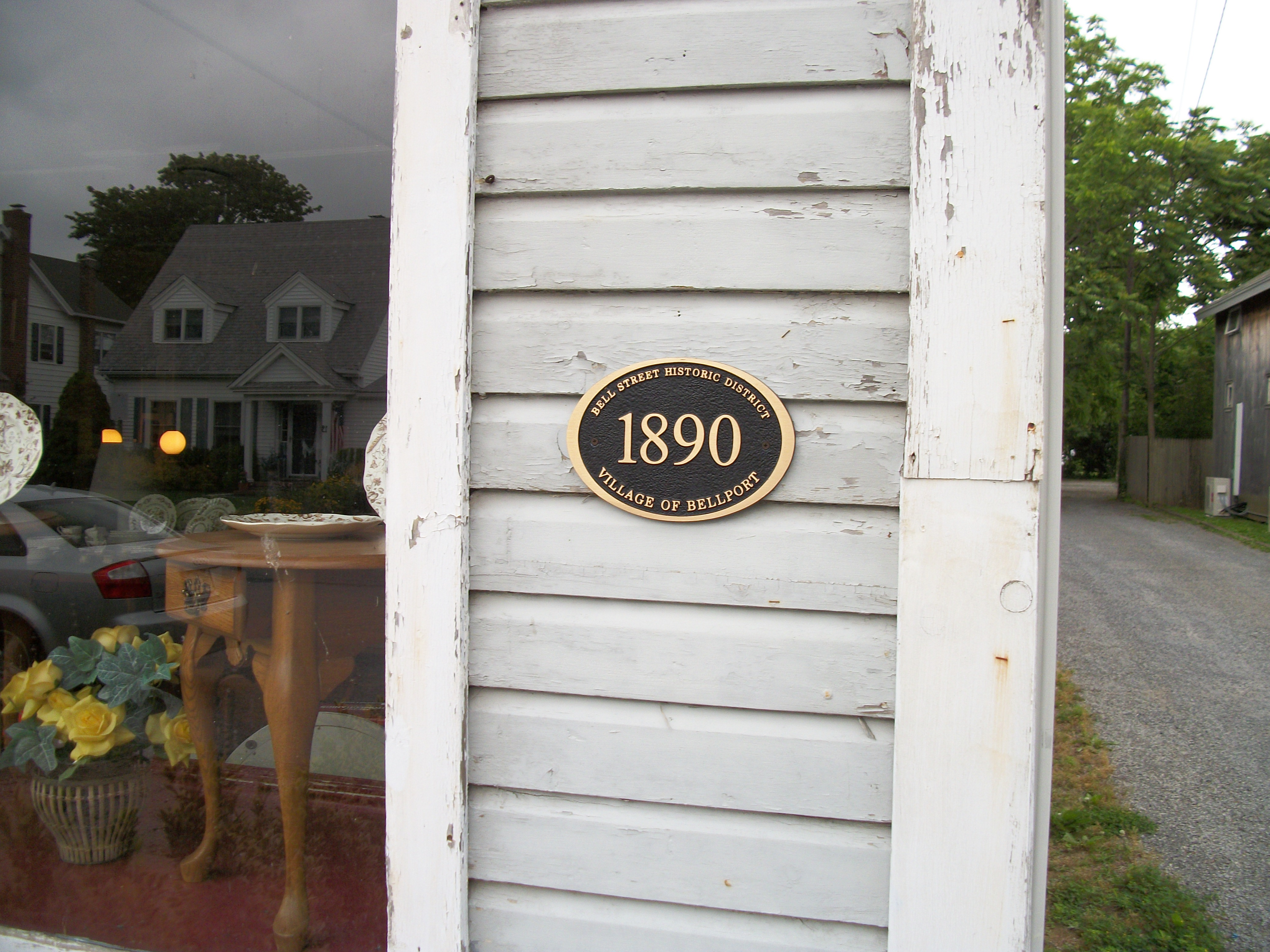
A plaque on the Historic Bellport Museum and Exchange Shop on Bell Street shows the old name of the historic district.

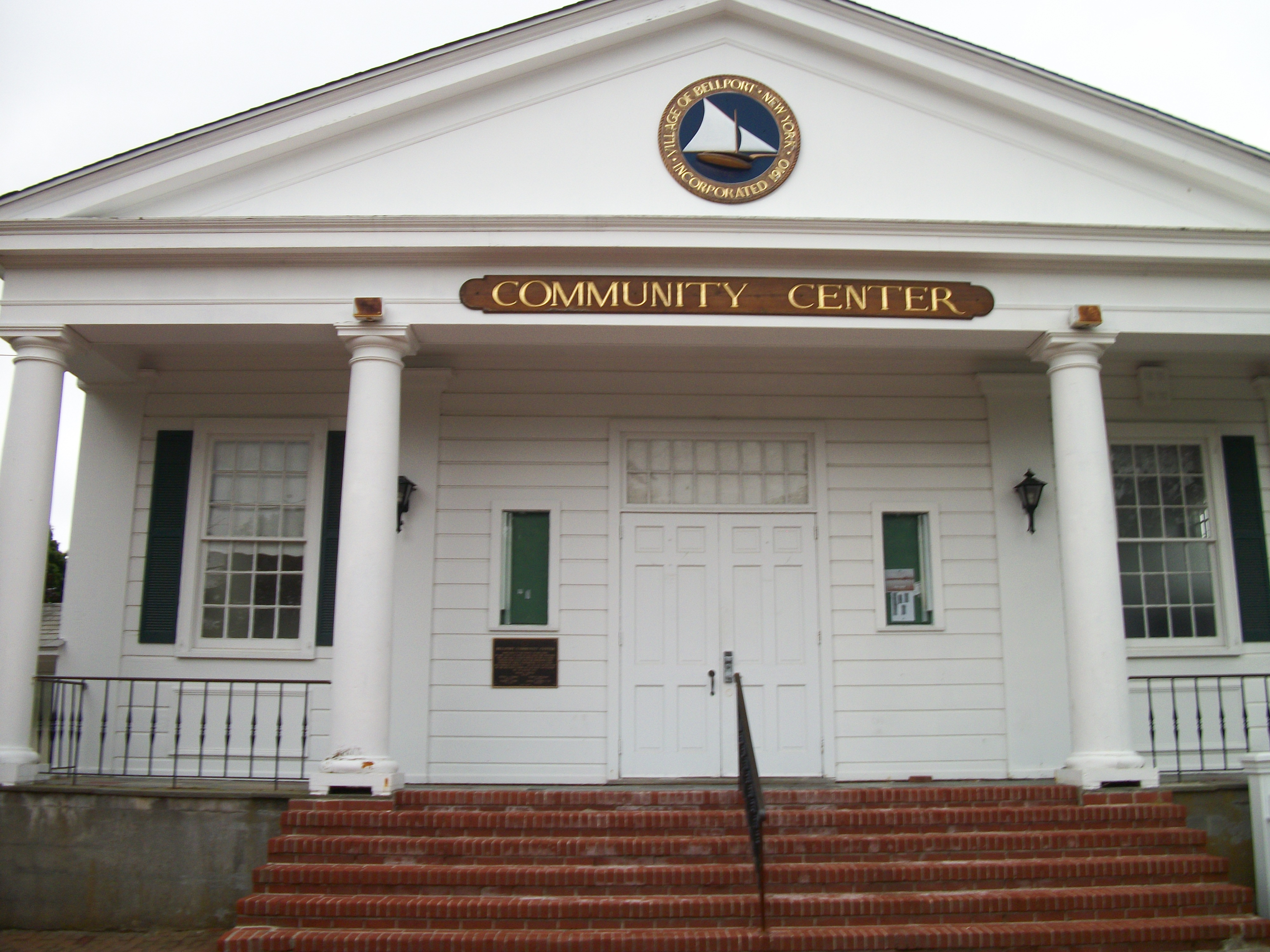
Bellport Community Center from 1920.

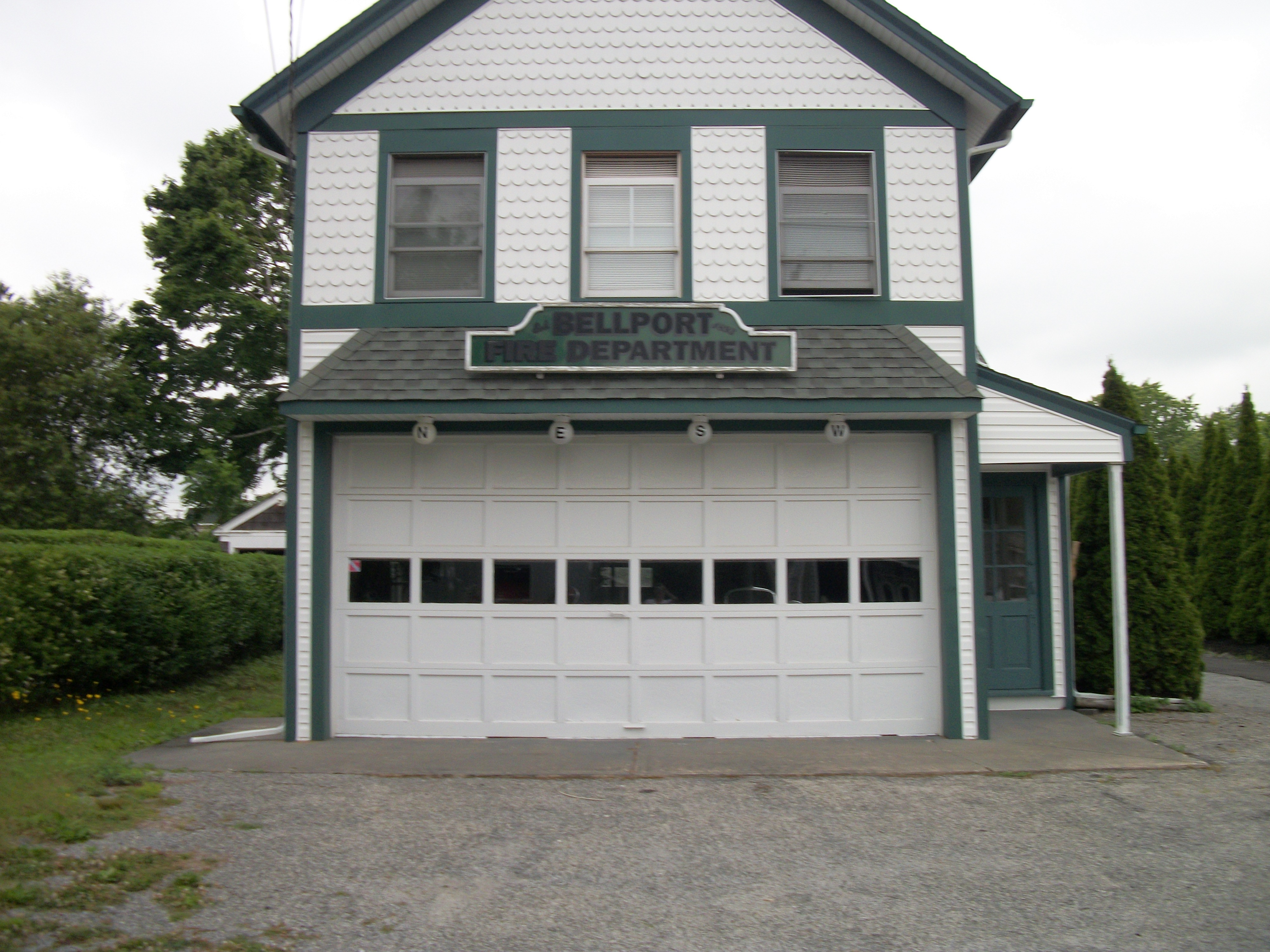
Old Bellport Firehouse.
