= Li Gang (politician, born 1965) =

Chinese politician

- 李刚

Head of the Discipline Inspection and Supervision Group of the Central Commission for Discipline Inspection and National Supervisory Commission
- In office January 2024 – April 2025
- Preceded by: Guo Wenqi

Communist Party Secretary of Zigong
- In office April 2016 – January 2020
- Preceded by: Lei Hongjin
- Succeeded by: Fan Bo

Communist Party Secretary of Bazhong
- In office February 2011 – April 2016
- Preceded by: Li Zhongbin
- Succeeded by: Feng Jian

Personal details
- Born: July 1965 (age 61) Dayi, Sichuan, China
- Party: Chinese Communist Party (1986–2025; expelled)
- Education: University of Electronic Science and Technology of China; Central Party School

Chinese name
- Simplified Chinese: 李刚
- Traditional Chinese: 李剛
Transcriptions
Standard Mandarin
- Hanyu Pinyin: Lǐ Gāng

Li Gang (Chinese: 李刚; born July 1965) is a Chinese politician who served as the head of the Discipline Inspection and Supervision Group of the Central Commission for Discipline Inspection and National Supervisory Commission, from 2024 to 2025. Previously, he served as Chinese Communist Party Committee Secretary of Zigong (2016–2020) and Bazhong (2011–2016).

== Early life ==
Li was born in July 1965 in Dayi County in Chengdu, Sichuan. He graduated from the University of Electronic Science and Technology of China with a Master's in Business Administration and later pursued advanced studies in economics at the Central Party School.

== Career ==
Li began his career in 1982 at the Dayi County Electric Power Company and joined the Chinese Communist Party (CCP) in 1986. He held various local government roles in Sichuan, including positions in Dayi County's township administration, tax bureau, and organization department. By 1997, he served as deputy county magistrate and later deputy secretary of Dayi County. From December 1997 to June 2001, Li served as a member of the Standing Committee of the CCP Dayi County Committee, deputy county chief and deputy secretary of the CCP County Committee of Sichuan. In 2001, he became deputy secretary and county magistrate of Wenjiang County, continuing as district head after Wenjiang's integration as a district in Chengdu in 2002. He was promoted to secretary of the CCP Wenjiang District Committee in 2004. In March 2004, he was promoted to secretary of the Wenjiang District Party Committee of the CCP and concurrently served as director of the Wenjiang District People's Congress Standing Committee. In 2011, he was appointed the CCP secretary of Bazhong, and in 2016, he became CCP secretary of Zigong. In 2020, he briefly served as director of the Sichuan Development and Reform Commission and later as vice governor of Sichuan. From 2008 to 2011, Li served as director and party secretary of the Sichuan Investment Promotion Bureau.

In 2021, he was transferred to Yunnan where he was assigned as the head of the Organization Department of the CCP Yunnan Provincial Committee.

In 2024, Li was appointed head of the Discipline Inspection and Supervision Team of the Central Commission for Discipline Inspection, the party's internal disciplinary body, and National Supervisory Commission, the highest anti-corruption agency of China, within the Organization Department of the Chinese Communist Party.

== Downfall ==
On 30 September 2024, Li was put under investigation for alleged "serious violations of discipline and laws" by the Central Commission for Discipline Inspection and the National Supervisory Commission.

On 7 April 2025, Li was expelled from the CCP and removed from public office. Later that month, he was arrested on suspicion of accepting bribes. On 24 July 2025, the Wuhan Municipal People's Procuratorate in Hubei submitted his case to the Wuhan Intermediate People's Court for public prosecution. On December 3, he was sentenced to 15 years in prison for accepting bribes of more than 102 million yuan ($14.44 million) and fined 6 million yuan ($850,000) by the Wuhan Intermediate People's Court in Hubei province.

Government offices
Preceded by Guo Wenqi	Head of the Discipline Inspection and Supervision Group of the Central Commission for Discipline Inspection and National Supervisory Commission; 2024-2025	Succeeded by TBA
Party political offices
Preceded by Lei Hongjin	Communist Party Secretary of Zigong; 2016–2020	Succeeded by Fan Bo
Preceded by Lei Zhongbin	Communist Party Secretary of Bazhong; 2011–2016	Succeeded by Feng Jian
