= Bellport Academy =

Historic building in Suffolk County, New York, US

- U.S. National Register of Historic Places
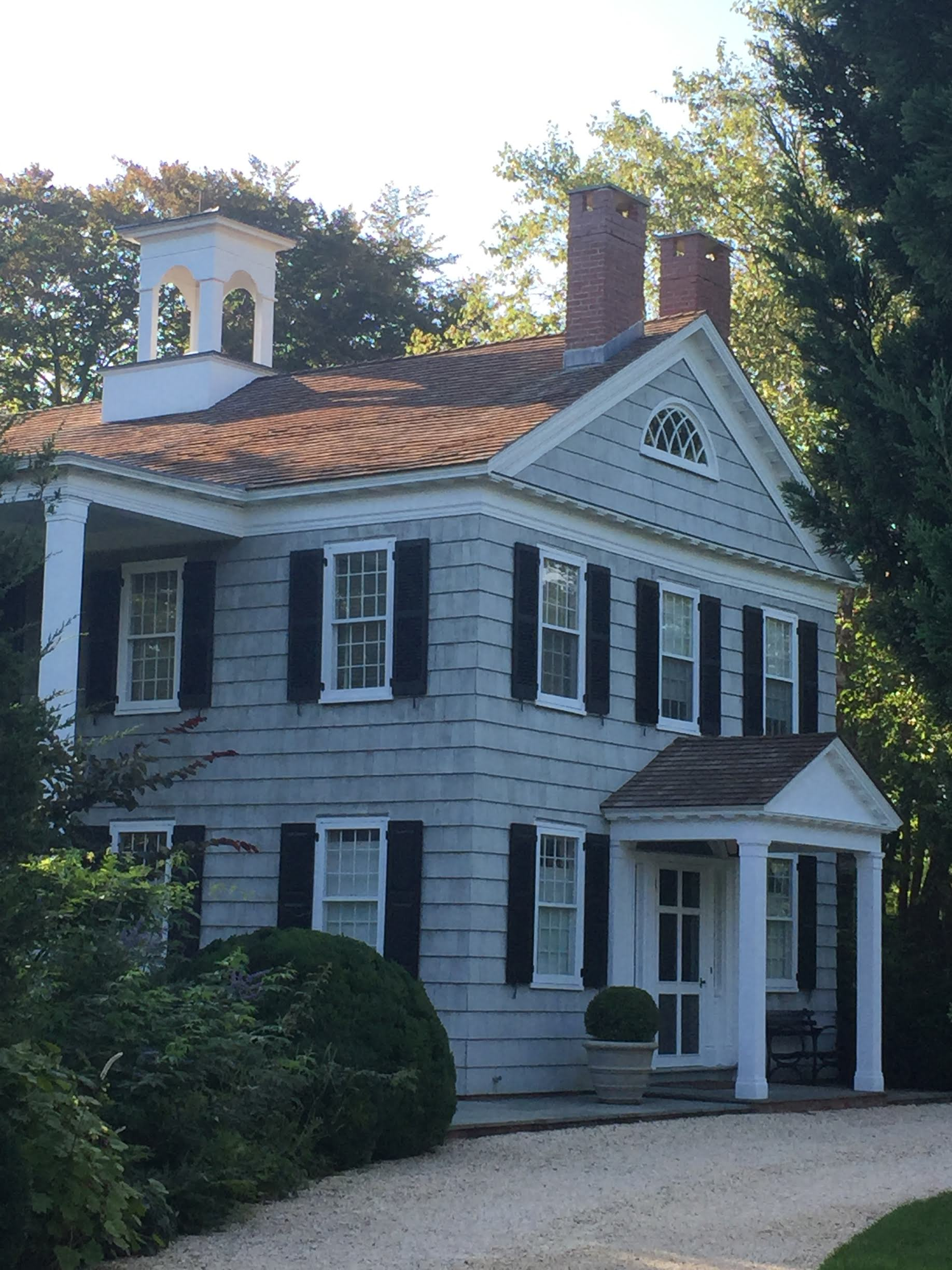
- Bellport Academy (private residence), 2018

- Location within New York Location within the United States
- Location: 24 Academy Lane, Bellport, New York
- Coordinates: 40°45′14.43″N 72°56′16.19″W
- Area: 0 acres (0 ha)
- MPS: Village of Bellport MRA
- NRHP reference No.: 02001452
- Added to NRHP: July 4, 1980

Bellport Academy is a historic school building located at Bellport in Suffolk County, New York. It was built in 1833 as the village's first school and remodeled in 1919. It is located within the Bellport Village Historic District.

It was added to the National Register of Historic Places in 1980, and currently survives as a private residence.
