= Rent Collection Courtyard =

The Rent Collection Courtyard (Chinese: 收租院; pinyin: shōuzū yuàn) is a clay collection of 114 life-sized sculptures located in the courtyard of the former home of rural landlord Liu Wencai in Dayi County, Sichuan, created by Ye Yushan and a team of sculptors from the Sichuan Academy of Fine Arts in 1965. It is a famous work of Socialist Realist sculpture showing an evil landlord collecting rent from poor peasants. Widely reproduced in various other media, including posters, comic strips, and film, Rent Collection Courtyard was promoted as an example of revolutionary realism and was a key precursor to the artistic movements of the Cultural Revolution. Copies were made and put on display in Beijing after modification to make them more powerful as works of propaganda.

In the 1999 Venice Biennale, the contemporary Chinese artist Cai Guo-Qiang referenced the sculpture in the performance piece Venice's Rent Collection Courtyard in which he hired artisans to recreate the sculpture. The original team later sued the artists who created this exhibit piece.
