= Bellport, New York =

- Village
- Incorporated Village of Bellport
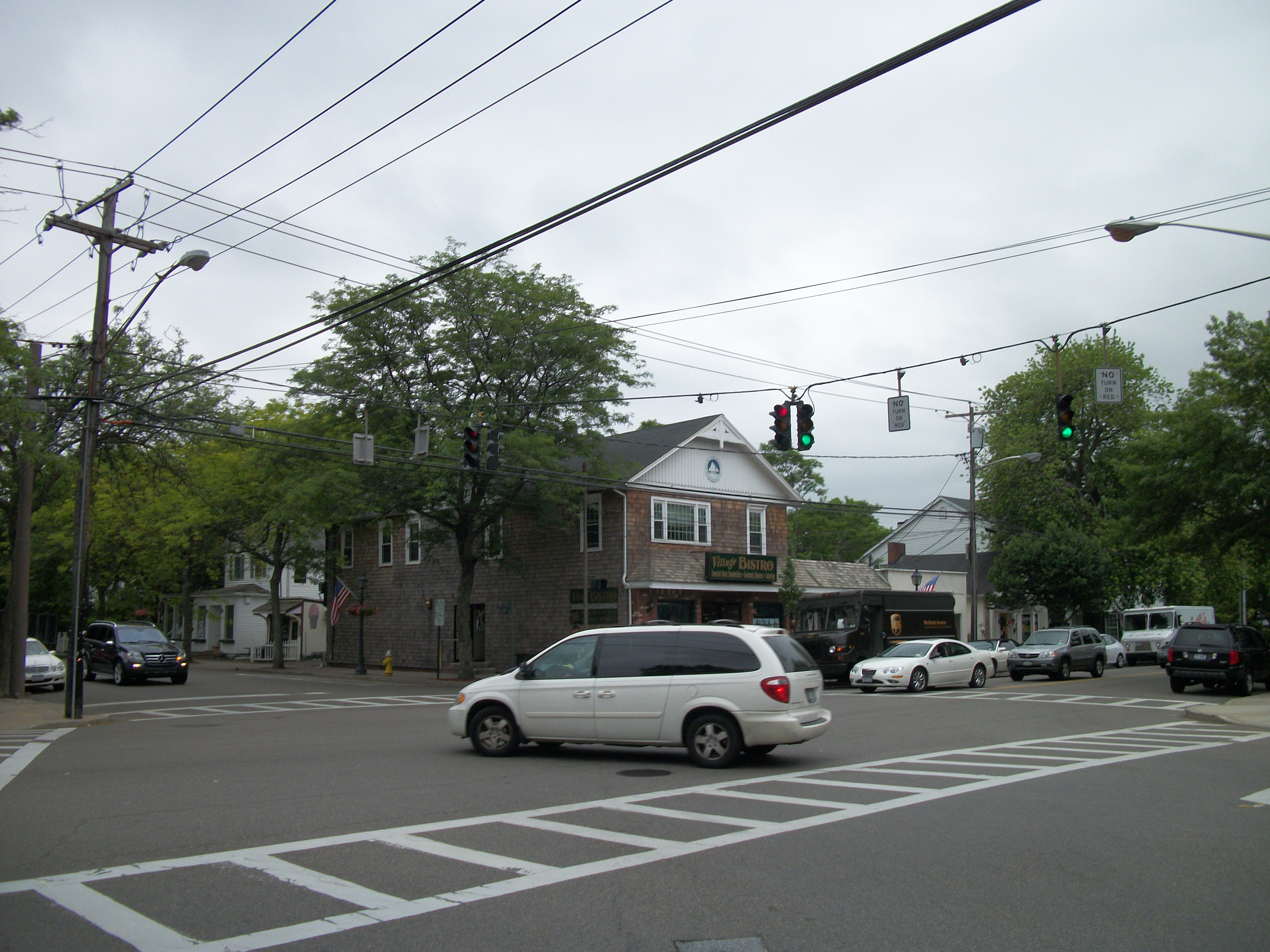
- The Four Corners in Bellport

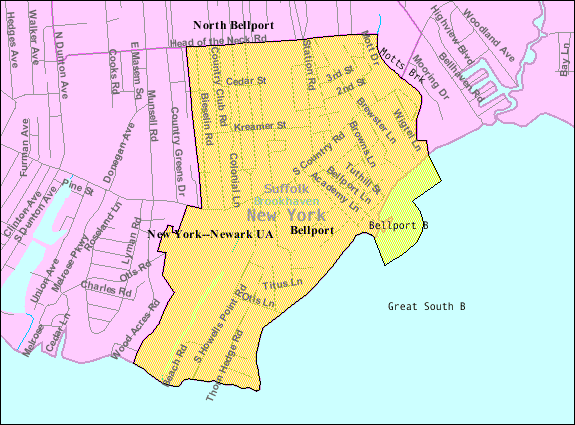
- U.S. census map

- Location on Long Island Location within the state of New York
- Coordinates: 40°45′25″N 72°56′30″W
- Country: United States
- State: New York
- County: Suffolk
- Town: Brookhaven
- Incorporated: 1910
- Named after: The Bell family

Area
  - Total: 1.53 sq mi (3.97 km^{2})
  - Land: 1.45 sq mi (3.76 km^{2})
  - Water: 0.081 sq mi (0.21 km^{2})
- Elevation: 26 ft (8 m)

Population (2020)
  - Total: 2,203
  - Density: 1,519.5/sq mi (586.67/km^{2})
- Time zone: UTC−05:00 (Eastern Time Zone)
  - Summer (DST): UTC−04:00
- ZIP Code: 11713
- Area codes: 631, 934
- FIPS code: 36-05771
- GNIS feature ID: 0943626
- Website: www.bellportvillageny.gov

Bellport is a village in the Town of Brookhaven in Suffolk County, on the South Shore of Long Island, in New York, United States. The population was 2,203 at the time of the 2020 census.

The Incorporated Village of Bellport is named after the Bell family, early settlers of the area. South Country Road (Main St.) in the village features small businesses such as antique shops, artist galleries, small inns, restaurants, and a service center. These family-run businesses get community support from the Bellport Chamber of Commerce. Bellport is also home to the Gateway Playhouse, a professional summer theater in operation since 1950.

== History ==
The land that is now Bellport was purchased along with what is now the hamlet of Brookhaven (then called Fireplace Neck) and western South Haven from the Unkechaug Indians in 1664 by settlers from nearby Setauket, who were attracted by the plentiful harvests of salt hay. The part that became Bellport was named Occumbomock Neck. Jonathan Rose was the first permanent settler in the 1680s, and by 1720 the Rose family owned much of Occumbomock Neck. In 1829, Captain Thomas Bell, a Scottish immigrant, bought land there. He sold sections of it, and by 1843 the village had 30 dwellings and 200 inhabitants. He changed the name to Bell-Port (now Bellport), envisioning a seaport, since Bellport was very close to the Old Inlet, a breach in the barrier island Fire Island, which gave Bellport easy access to the open ocean. With Colonel William Howell, Bell built a dock and a road to the dock. But the breach healed over, and Bellport instead became a tourist attraction, with wealthy visitors coming by railroad and then coach from New York City. Although all seven hotels eventually closed, the last in the 1950s, Bellport remained associated with wealthy New Yorkers, who eventually established year-round residences. After World War II, nearby Camp Upton was converted into Brookhaven National Laboratory, bringing in more, highly educated, year-round residents.

Bellport was incorporated as a village in 1910. On July 4, 1980, the Bellport Academy and Bellport Village Historic District were listed on the National Register of Historic Places.

On September 21, 1938, the "Long Island Express" Category 3 hurricane made its first landfall near Bellport accompanied by catastrophic winds and a large storm surge.

On March 8, 1963, the original Bellport High School burned down. No one was killed, but 40 students and teachers were hospitalized. The replacement school was built in Brookhaven, but is still called Bellport High School.

On November 26, 1983, the New York Pyrotechnic Products Company factory (now known as Fireworks by Grucci) just north of the village exploded, killing two and injuring 24. The explosion had the effect of an earthquake, causing significant damage to hundreds of homes.

== Geography ==
According to the United States Census Bureau, the village has an area of 1.5 square miles (4.0 km^{2}), of which 1.4 square miles (3.7 km^{2}) is land and 0.077 square miles (0.2 km^{2}), or 5.94%, is water. The village of Bellport is on the shore of Bellport Bay, an arm of the Great South Bay.

The village gained territory between the 2010 and 2020 censuses, when the Town of Brookhaven approved the annexation of the Ho-Hum Beach property by Bellport.

=== Ho Hum Beach ===
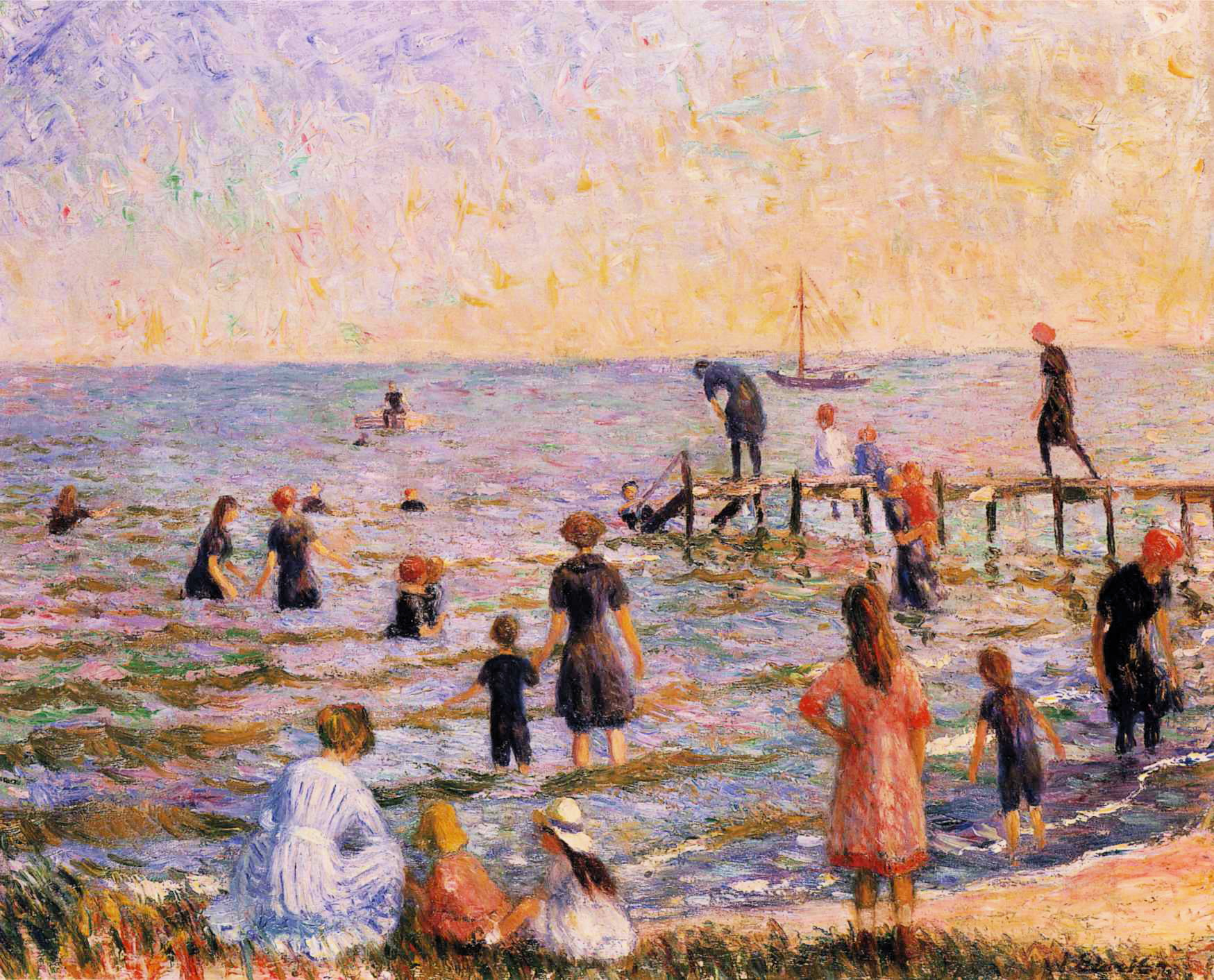
Bathing at Bellport by William Glackens

Ho Hum Beach is on Fire Island, 2.2 miles (3.5 km) across the Great South Bay from the Bellport Village Marina. Village residents and their guests are welcome to visit the beach. Surfers, sunbathers, and fishermen especially enjoy its privateness. Ho Hum Beach offers a bathing area, a screened-in snack shack and showers on the bay side of the beach. The Whalehouse Point ferry runs from the Bellport Village Marina from late May to early September. Village residents can buy round-trip ferry tickets, and their guests may ride the ferry for an increased fare. Village residents are also welcome to ride their own boats over. Boat slips for non-residents are available for a fee.

== Demographics ==
Historical population
Census	Pop.	Note	%±
1880	297		—
1910	419		—
1920	614		46.5%
1930	633		3.1%
1940	650		2.7%
1950	1,449		122.9%
1960	2,461		69.8%
1970	3,046		23.8%
1980	2,809		−7.8%
1990	2,572		−8.4%
2000	2,363		−8.1%
2010	2,084		−11.8%
2020	2,203		5.7%
U.S. Decennial Census

=== 2020 census ===
As of the 2020 census, Bellport had a population of 2,203. The median age was 51.8 years. 16.5% of residents were under the age of 18 and 29.1% of residents were 65 years of age or older. For every 100 females there were 97.8 males, and for every 100 females age 18 and over there were 96.0 males age 18 and over.

100.0% of residents lived in urban areas, while 0.0% lived in rural areas.

There were 938 households in Bellport, of which 23.2% had children under the age of 18 living in them. Of all households, 50.5% were married-couple households, 17.3% were households with a male householder and no spouse or partner present, and 24.7% were households with a female householder and no spouse or partner present. About 29.0% of all households were made up of individuals and 16.2% had someone living alone who was 65 years of age or older.

There were 1,170 housing units, of which 19.8% were vacant. The homeowner vacancy rate was 0.6% and the rental vacancy rate was 12.4%.

Racial composition as of the 2020 census
Race	Number	Percent
White	1,954	88.7%
Black or African American	46	2.1%
American Indian and Alaska Native	8	0.4%
Asian	34	1.5%
Native Hawaiian and Other Pacific Islander	0	0.0%
Some other race	18	0.8%
Two or more races	143	6.5%
Hispanic or Latino (of any race)	118	5.4%

=== 2000 census ===
As of the census of 2000, there were 2,363 people, 993 households, and 684 families residing in the village. The population density was 1,619.7 inhabitants per square mile (625.4/km^{2}). There were 1,139 housing units at an average density of 780.7 per square mile (301.4/km^{2}). The racial makeup of the village was 95.13% White, 1.27% African American, 0.38% Native American, 1.65% Asian, 0.08% Pacific Islander, 0.21% from other races, and 1.27% from two or more races. Hispanic or Latino of any race were 1.78% of the population.

There were 993 households, out of which 23.0% had children under the age of 18 living with them, 58.4% were married couples living together, 7.8% had a female householder with no husband present, and 31.1% were non-families. 24.5% of all households were made up of individuals, and 12.5% had someone living alone who was 65 years of age or older. The average household size was 2.38 and the average family size was 2.86.

In the village, the population was spread out, with 18.7% under the age of 18, 4.6% from 18 to 24, 24.0% from 25 to 44, 32.2% from 45 to 64, and 20.4% who were 65 years of age or older. The median age was 46 years. For every 100 females, there were 90.6 males. For every 100 females age 18 and over, there were 89.8 males.

The median income for a household in the village was $77,523, and the median income for a family was $80,850. Males had a median income of $51,189 versus $40,985 for females. The per capita income for the village was $38,906. About 0.6% of families and 1.6% of the population were below the poverty threshold, including 0.9% of those under age 18 and 1.7% of those age 65 or over.

== Government ==
The village is governed by the Incorporated Village of Bellport Board of Trustees, which consists of four trustees and a mayor. Each trustee is elected to a two-year term, with two trustees up for election every year. The mayor is also elected to a two-year term.

Bellport is responsible for many local services, such as snow removal, road maintenance, and garbage removal. These are paid for by taxes on property within the village boundaries, which the Brookhaven town receiver of taxes collects. Education is the responsibility of the South Country Central School District, ambulance service is provided by the South Country Ambulance Company, fire service by the Bellport Fire District, and police service by the Suffolk County Police Department and Bellport code enforcement.

== Education ==
The South Country Central School District serves the Bellport community. It has six schools, three elementary schools (kindergarten–grade 3), Frank P. Long Intermediate School (grades 4–5), Bellport Middle School (grades 6–8) and Bellport High School.

== Transportation ==
Bellport is served by two bus routes, the 66 (which runs from the Patchogue LIRR station to the Riverhead LIRR station, running mostly on Montauk Highway before turning onto William Floyd Parkway in Mastic and running along Neighborhood Road in Mastic Beach, then turning onto Mastic Road and ultimately rejoining Montauk Highway) and the 77 (which runs from the Patchogue LIRR station to South Country Road in Bellport). Both bus routes also provide a direct connection to the Bellport LIRR station in the hamlet of North Bellport.

The main route through Bellport is South Country Road (Suffolk CR 36), that runs west to east from East Patchogue to Brookhaven. The main south–north road is Bellport Lane, which shifts to Station Road north of South Country Road, and runs toward West Yaphank. Other roads include Head of the Neck Road, which runs west through east from East Patchogue and skirts the village's northern border east of Fairway Drive.

== Notable people ==
- Tommy Baldwin Jr., racing driver and mechanic
- Tiki Barber, NFL player
- Amanda Burden, urban planner
- Vishaan Chakrabarti, architect, author, and educator
- William Glackens (1870–1938), artist
- Felix Grucci, Fireworks by Grucci
- William Higinbotham (1910–1994), physicist at nearby Brookhaven National Laboratory; developed one of the earliest video games, Tennis for Two
- Bryan Johnson, NFL player
- Kirke La Shelle (1862-1905), journalist, playwright and theatrical producer
- Selina Maitreya (born 1955), international photography consultant and author
- Mike McAlary (1957–1998), journalist, Pulitzer Prize winner
- Samuel Irving Newhouse Jr. (1927–2017), magazine publisher
- Jacqueline Kennedy Onassis (1929–1994), first lady of the United States
- Arthur Pinajian (1914–1999), artist and comic book creator
- Billy Porter, actor, singer and style icon
- Charlie Rose, television talk show host
- Isabella Rossellini, actress
- Randy Smith (1948–2009), NBA player
- Elmer Ambrose Sperry (1860–1930), inventor of gyroscope and founder of Sperry Rail Service, the first internal rail flaw detection company
- George Tooker (1920–2011), figurative painter
- William Weld, former governor of Massachusetts and New York gubernatorial candidate
- P. G. Wodehouse (1881–1975), English comic writer

== See also ==
- List of municipalities in New York
