= Fireworks by Grucci =

American fireworks company

- Founded: 1850
- Headquarters: Bellport, New York, United States
- Website: www.grucci.com

Fireworks by Grucci is an American fireworks company headquartered in Bellport on New York's Long Island. It has been a family-run business since 1850. The company's main fireworks office and operations are in Bellport, New York, with a manufacturing and government work factory in Radford, Virginia.

According to the American Pyrotechnics Association, an industry trade group, Fireworks by Grucci is "one of the nation's premier pyrotechnics firms."

== History ==
The company traces its pyrotechnic roots to Bari, Italy, where Angelo Lanzetta reportedly was an apprentice to an Italian fireworks family. Lanzetta was the great-great-grandfather of Felix Grucci Sr., after whom the company was named.

Grucci Sr. continued to develop the company with such innovations as the stringless shell, which improved fireworks safety by eliminating burning fallout. The company also developed mock atomic bomb tests for the Department of Defense. The Grucci family received accolades for its performance on the Charles River in Boston during the 1976 bicentennial celebration, its first major performance outside the New York metropolitan area.

In 1979, the Gruccis became the first American family to win the Gold Medal for the United States at the annual Monte Carlo International Fireworks Competition, an event revered by the fireworks industry as the most prestigious competition in the world. This also earned the family their nickname, "America's First Family of Fireworks," from the New York press.

In 1983, disaster struck the company when an explosion at the company's factory in Bellport, New York killed two family members and heavily damaged dozens of nearby homes. As a result, the company moved its operations from Bellport to Yaphank, New York, a more secluded area.

In 2008, the company provided fireworks for a party on Staten Island to celebrate Julius Nasso, a film producer and friend of the Gotti family, getting out of prison.

== Facility ==
Grucci's Brookhaven facility is set in a tightly controlled enclosure. Safety is kept at a premium by using caution signs, eight-foot-high barbed wire fencing, and huge sand-and-gravel barriers. In addition, copper plates are placed on the outside of the assembly buildings to discharge static, while no more than four workers are allowed at a time in any one building.

== Technology ==
Fireworks by Grucci has adapted the use of technology, including the use of computers to electronically fire the shells. It has also switched from using the traditionally used cardboard gun barrels to fiberglass and steel, which is better able to absorb a misfire.

== Noteworthy displays ==
Fireworks by Grucci has produced fireworks displays for various United States and international events, including:

- Seven consecutive U.S. Presidential inaugurations beginning with Ronald Reagan;
- Statue of Liberty Centennial (1986);
- Brooklyn Bridge Centennial;
- Olympic Games in Lake Placid, Los Angeles, Salt Lake City, Beijing, and more;
- World's Fairs in Knoxville, Tennessee, New Orleans, Los Angeles and Taejon, Korea
- Dubai 2014 fireworks display, a Guinness world record. Including 479,651 shells fired in just six minutes on New Year's Eve, at a rate of almost 80K shells per minute and 1,332 fireworks per second
- Donald Trump's 2019 Salute to America, Fourth of July 2019 event, used Grucci fireworks.
- Donald Trump's 2020 Salute to America
- 2020 Republican National Convention

The company has also created displays in Florida and Hawaii.
