= Dayi County =

Dayi County 大邑县
- County
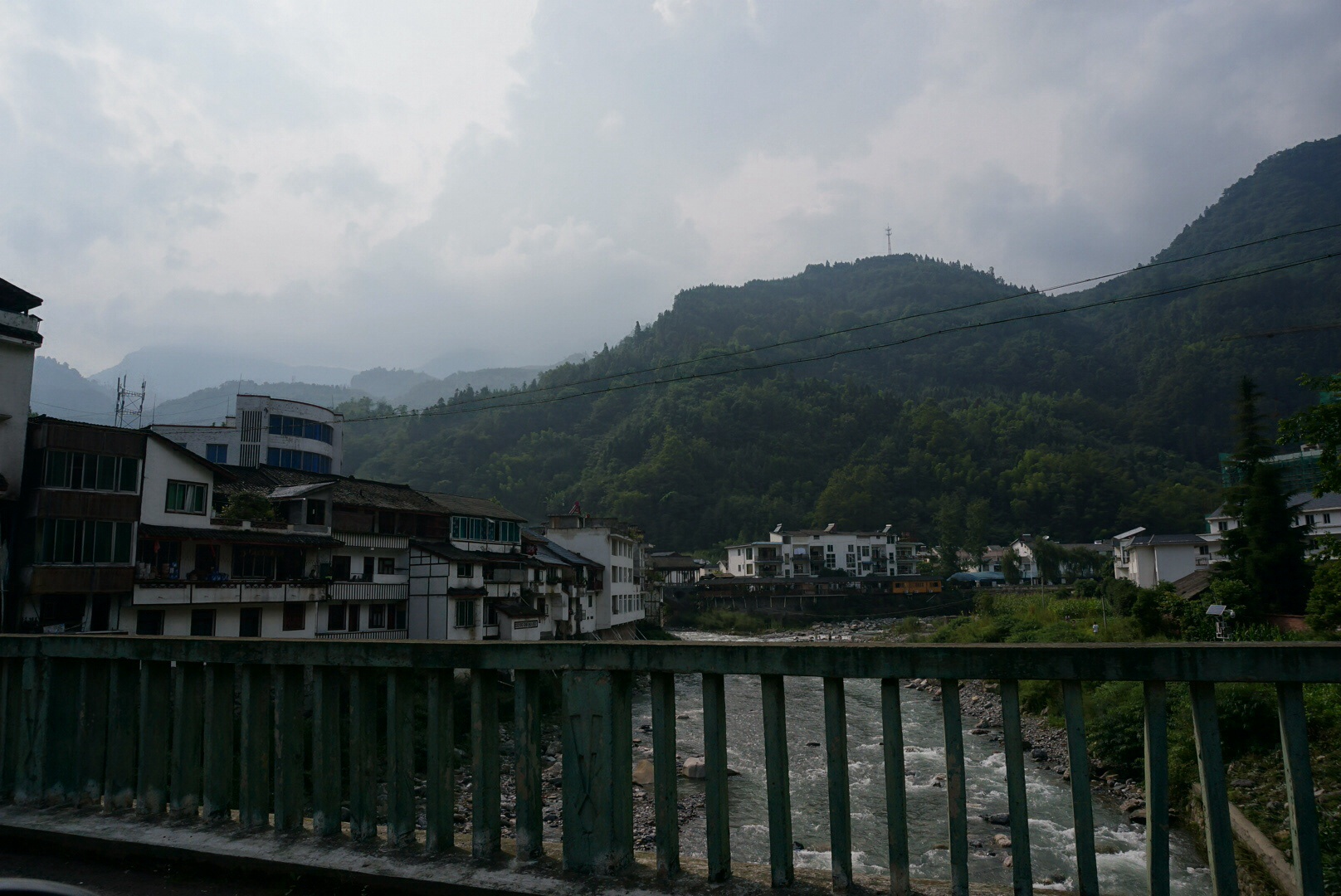

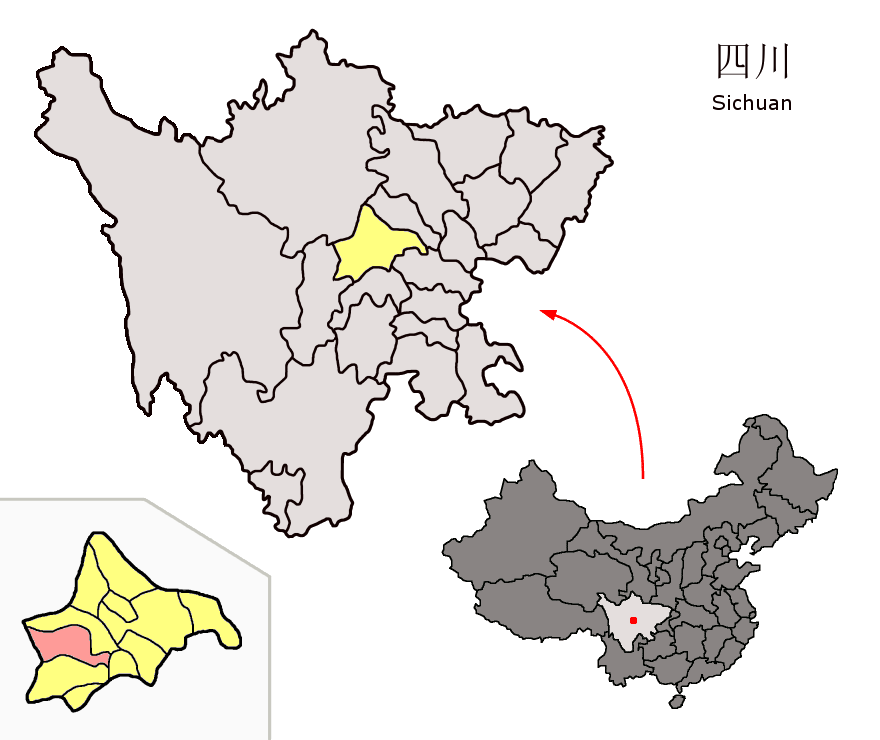
- Location of Dayi County in Sichuan

- Location in Sichuan
- Coordinates: 30°35′17″N 103°32′10″E
- Country: China
- Province: Sichuan
- Sub-provincial city: Chengdu
- County seat: Jinyuan Subdistrict

Area
  - Total: 1,548 km^{2} (598 sq mi)

Population (2020)
  - Total: 515,962
  - Density: 378/km^{2} (980/sq mi)
- Time zone: UTC+8 (China Standard)
- Postal code: 6113XX
- Division code: DYI

Dayi County (Chinese: 大邑县; pinyin: Dàyì Xiàn) is a county of the City of Chengdu, capital city of Sichuan, China. It is Chengdu City's westernmost division, bordering the prefecture-level divisions of Ya'an to the south and the Ngawa Tibetan and Qiang Autonomous Prefecture to the north.

The Jianchuan Museum Cluster is located in the town of Anren, Dayi County, about one hour's drive from the provincial capital Chengdu. It consists of 15 museums which showcase China's largest private collection of artifacts amassed during the last 60–70 years.

Also in Anren but outside the museum cluster is the Liu Family Estate Museum, formerly the Dayi Landlord Manor Exhibition Hall. It opened in 1959 and developed a nationwide significance in 1965 after installing the life-size clay sculpture series Rent Collection Courtyard. In its first decades, the museum emphasized the history of China's class struggle and had tens of millions of visitors. As the Liu Family Estate Museum, it places greater emphasis on aspects of heritage tourism and the aesthetic qualities of Rent Collection Courtyard.

== Administrative divisions ==
Dayi County administers three subdistricts and eight towns:

Subdistricts

- Jinyuan 晋原街道
- Shaqu 沙渠街道
- Qingxia 青霞街道

Towns

- Wangsi 王泗镇
- Xinchang 新场镇
- Yuelai 悦来镇
- Anren 安仁镇
- Chujiang 䢺江镇
- Huashuiwan 花水湾镇
- Xiling 西岭镇
- Heming 鹤鸣镇

== Climate ==
Climate data for Dayi, elevation 545 m (1,788 ft), (1991–2020 normals, extremes 1981–present)
Month	Jan	Feb	Mar	Apr	May	Jun	Jul	Aug	Sep	Oct	Nov	Dec	Year
Record high °C (°F)	20.6 (69.1)	22.9 (73.2)	31.2 (88.2)	32.2 (90.0)	35.1 (95.2)	36.2 (97.2)	38.1 (100.6)	39.1 (102.4)	35.3 (95.5)	29.5 (85.1)	26.0 (78.8)	18.7 (65.7)	39.1 (102.4)
Mean daily maximum °C (°F)	9.3 (48.7)	12.2 (54.0)	16.9 (62.4)	22.6 (72.7)	26.6 (79.9)	28.5 (83.3)	30.3 (86.5)	30.1 (86.2)	26.0 (78.8)	21.1 (70.0)	16.3 (61.3)	10.9 (51.6)	20.9 (69.6)
Daily mean °C (°F)	5.8 (42.4)	8.3 (46.9)	12.1 (53.8)	17.2 (63.0)	21.4 (70.5)	24.0 (75.2)	25.7 (78.3)	25.3 (77.5)	21.9 (71.4)	17.5 (63.5)	12.8 (55.0)	7.5 (45.5)	16.6 (61.9)
Mean daily minimum °C (°F)	3.2 (37.8)	5.5 (41.9)	8.6 (47.5)	13.2 (55.8)	17.5 (63.5)	20.6 (69.1)	22.4 (72.3)	21.9 (71.4)	19.3 (66.7)	15.3 (59.5)	10.4 (50.7)	5.0 (41.0)	13.6 (56.4)
Record low °C (°F)	−4.5 (23.9)	−3.7 (25.3)	−2.1 (28.2)	4.1 (39.4)	6.5 (43.7)	14.2 (57.6)	16.3 (61.3)	16.4 (61.5)	12.3 (54.1)	3.1 (37.6)	0.5 (32.9)	−5.1 (22.8)	−5.1 (22.8)
Average precipitation mm (inches)	10.5 (0.41)	14.6 (0.57)	31.8 (1.25)	57.1 (2.25)	84.7 (3.33)	111.2 (4.38)	246.0 (9.69)	278.6 (10.97)	137.3 (5.41)	57.2 (2.25)	21.9 (0.86)	9.5 (0.37)	1,060.4 (41.74)
Average precipitation days (≥ 0.1 mm)	9.1	10.0	13.0	14.6	14.8	16.8	16.1	15.8	17.5	16.4	9.8	7.9	161.8
Average snowy days	1.1	0.3	0	0	0	0	0	0	0	0	0	0.3	1.7
Average relative humidity (%)	82	80	79	78	74	79	83	83	84	85	83	83	81
Mean monthly sunshine hours	46.2	51.6	76.9	105.4	106.9	100.8	121.0	125.4	60.4	49.2	51.8	50.9	946.5
Percentage possible sunshine	14	16	21	27	25	24	28	31	16	14	17	16	21
Source: China Meteorological Administration all-time extreme temperature all-time January highall-time July high
