= North Iwo Jima =

Island of the Japanese Volcano Islands chain south of the Ogasawara Islands

Native name: Japanese: 北硫黄島
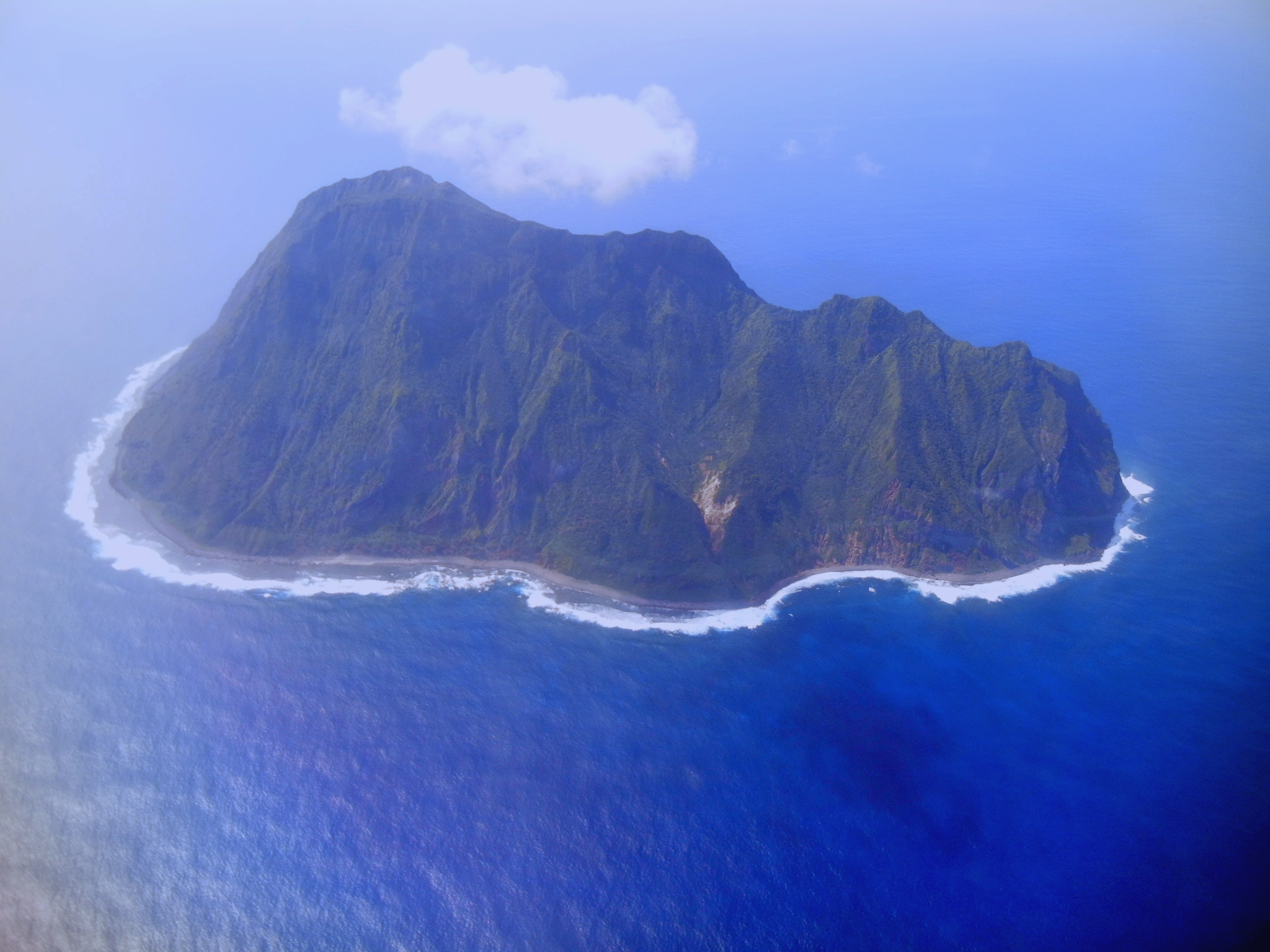
- Kita-Ioto Island seen from the east

- Location within Japan

Geography
- Location: Pacific Ocean
- Coordinates: 25°26′05″N 141°16′51″E
- Archipelago: Volcano Islands
- Area: 5.57 km^{2} (2.15 sq mi)
- Coastline: 8.0 km (4.97 mi)
- Highest elevation: 792 m (2598 ft)
- Highest point: Sakagi-ga-mine

Administration
- Japan
- Prefecture: Tokyo
- Subprefecture: Ogasawara Subprefecture
- Village: Ogasawara

Demographics
- Population: 0
- Pop. density: 0/km^{2} (0/sq mi)

North Iwo Jima (Japanese: 北硫黄島, Kita Iwōjima, "North Sulfur Island"), officially North or Kita Iōtō (written with the same characters) and previously known as Santo or San Alessandro, Hooge Meeuwen Island (Dutch: t'Hooge Meuwen Eylandt, "High Seagull Island"), and North Sulfur Island, is the northernmost member of Japan's Volcano Islands. Together with the Bonin Islands, the Volcanos form the Ogasawara Archipelago and Ogasawara Subprefecture. Along with the Bonins and Izu Islands, they form the Nanpo Islands, formally organized as part of the Tokyo Metropolitan Government. North Iwo Jima is located 80 kilometers (50 mi) north of Iwo Jima, 207 kilometers (129 mi) SSW of Chichijima in the Bonins, and 1,170 kilometers (730 mi) south of Tokyo on Honshu. Previously inhabited by two Japanese villages from 1898 to 1944, it has become a desert island.

== Geography ==
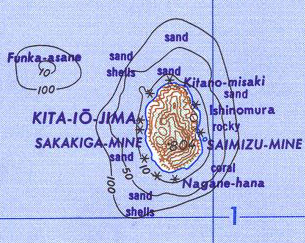
Map of North Iwo jima

The island consists of the heavily eroded peak of an active stratovolcano, which rises 792 meters (2,598 ft) above sea level (804 meters (2,638 ft) according to other sources). Having a volume of 3,338 cubic kilometers (801 cubic miles), it is the largest volcano in Japan by volume. The peak is called Sakagi-ga-mine (榊ヶ峰), with another 665-meter-tall (2,182 ft) peak at Shimizu-ga-mine (清水峰). It has an area of 5.57 square kilometers (2.15 mi^{2}), and it has a shore length of 8.0 kilometers (5.0 mi). It is an uninhabited part of the municipality of Ogasawara. Its Japanese name was changed to Kita-Iōtō on 18 June 2007. The island forms part of the Kazan-retto islands Important Bird Area (IBA), designated by BirdLife International.

== History ==
Micronesian altars, graves, tools, and pottery were discovered on North Iwo Jima by a Tokyo research group in 1991. They are believed to date from sometime between the 8th and 16th century.

Commanding the carrack San Juan de Letrán, the Spanish explorer Bernardo de la Torre almost certainly sighted the Volcano Islands at some point between 25 September and 2 October 1543 while making another failed attempt to sail east across the Pacific from the Philippines to New Spain. (No attempt would be successful until 1565.) Attempting to secure reinforcements for Ruy López de Villalobos when Filipino resistance proved unexpectedly strong, De la Torre apparently passed the islands during an eruption on South Iwo Jima, realized his supply of water would be insufficient for completing his mission, and returned south to rendezvous with López de Villalobos in the Moluccas. Over the next century, other Spanish sailors passed the islands—particularly once Alonso de Arellano found a safe northeastern route back to Mexico from the Philippines—without settling or formally claiming them.

It was similarly ignored by the Dutch, British, and Japanese until a relatively late date. The Japanese eventually colonized the island, with fisherman from the Bonins settling in 1898. They lived in two villages, Ishino or Ishinomura on the east and Nishi or Nishimura on the west, which were unincorporated until they were formally added to Iōtō in 1940. The population was around 103 people when all civilians were forcibly evacuated to Honshu in 1944 near the end of World War II. Following the Japanese surrender, the US military occupied North Iwo Jima along with the other Nanpo Islands and the Ryukyus. North Iwo Jima was returned to Japan with the Bonins in 1968. The island is notionally organized as part of Tokyo's Ogasawara Village and Subprefecture but remains unpopulated.

Four US Navy aviators—Scott Zellem, Patrick Myrick, James Pupplo, and Joshua Showalter—from the John C. Stennis died when their S-3B Viking crashed into North Iwo Jima on 10 August 2004 during a naval exercise.

The Japanese pronunciation of the characters in the name was officially reverted to Kita-Iōtō in 2007.

== 2009 total solar eclipse ==
During the solar eclipse of 22 July 2009, the island had nearly six and a half minutes of totality, longer than any other land mass.

== Gallery ==
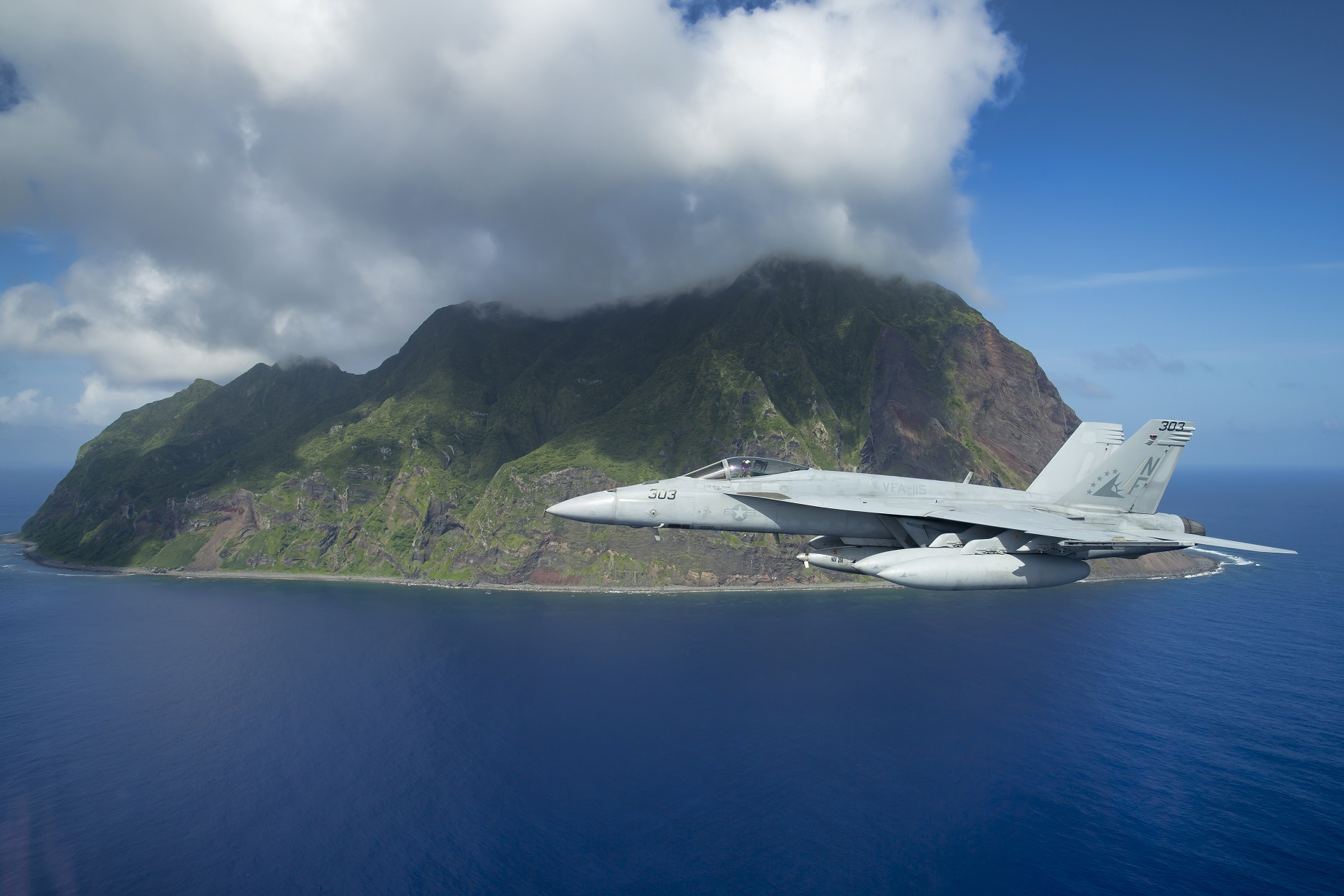

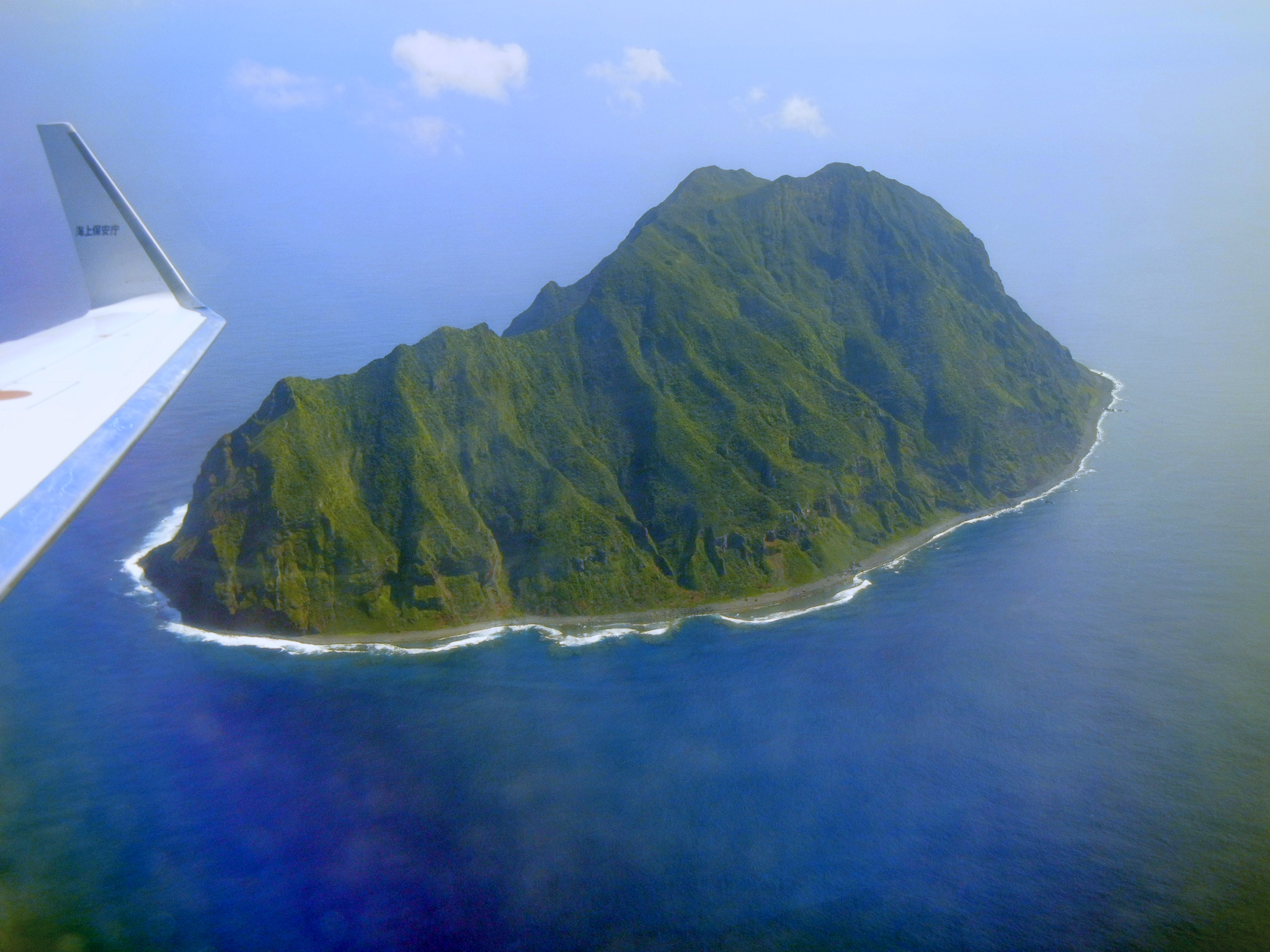
Kita-Ioto Island seen from the NW

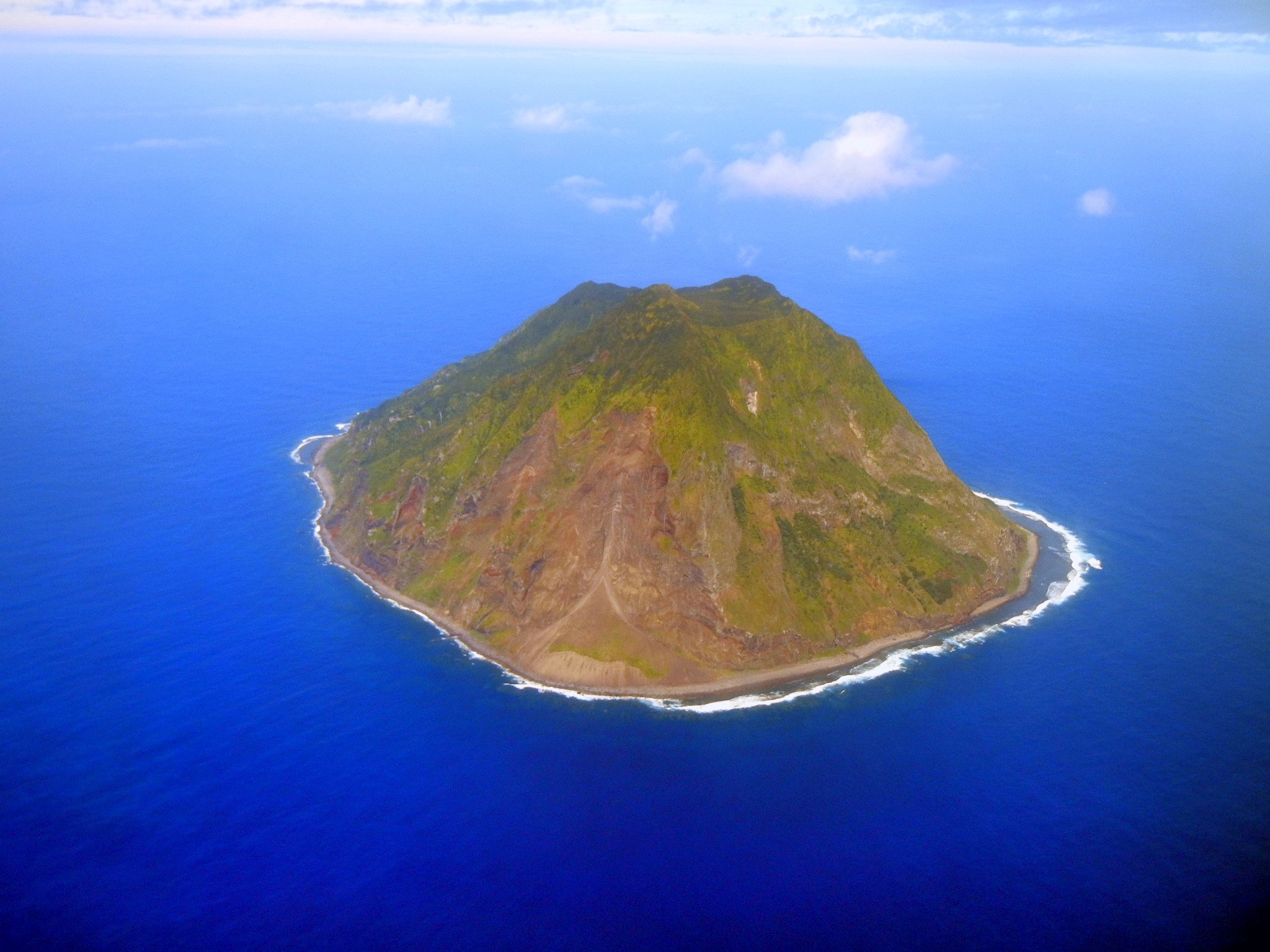
Kita-Ioto Island seen from the south

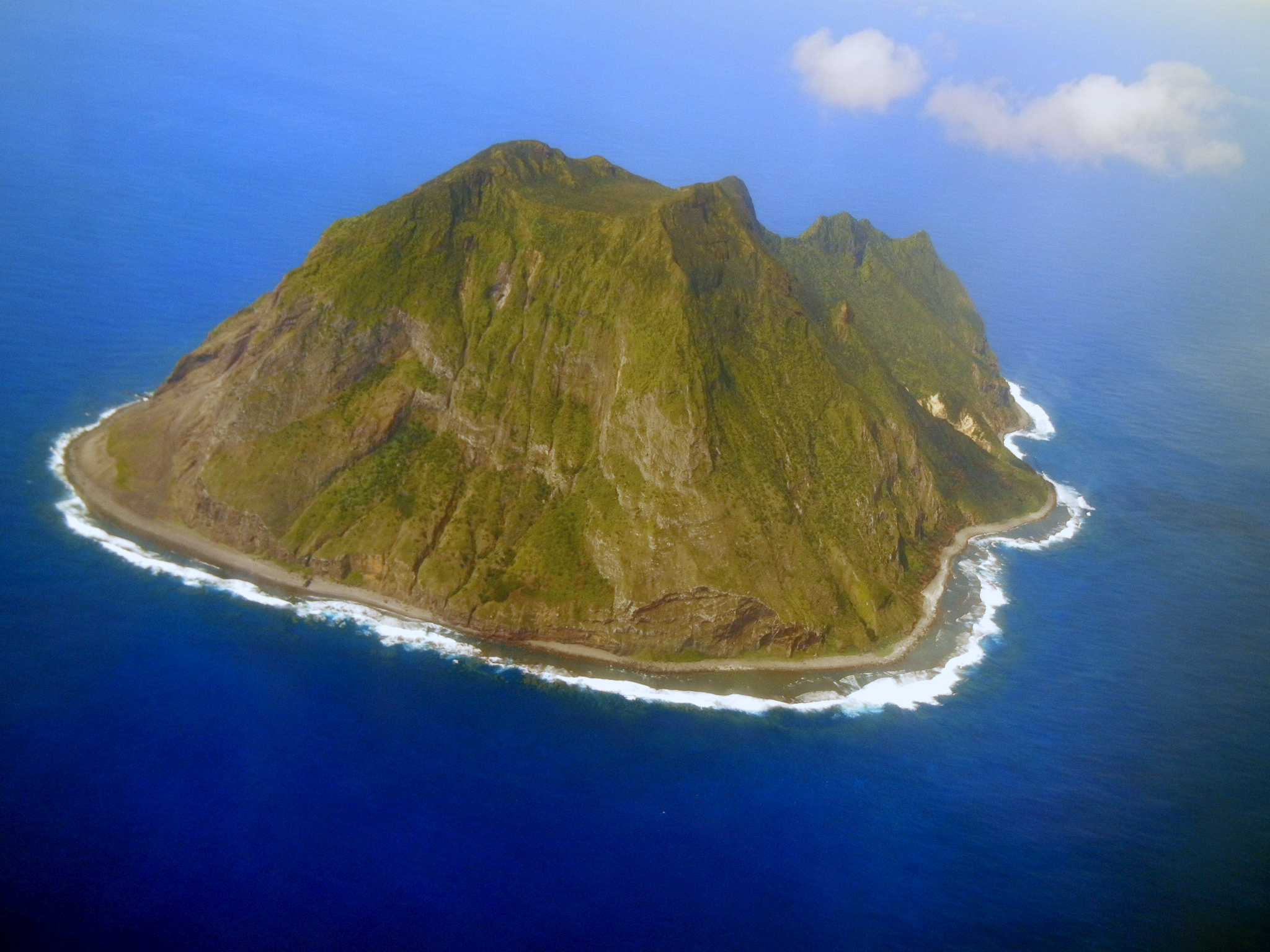
Kita-Ioto Island seen from the SSE

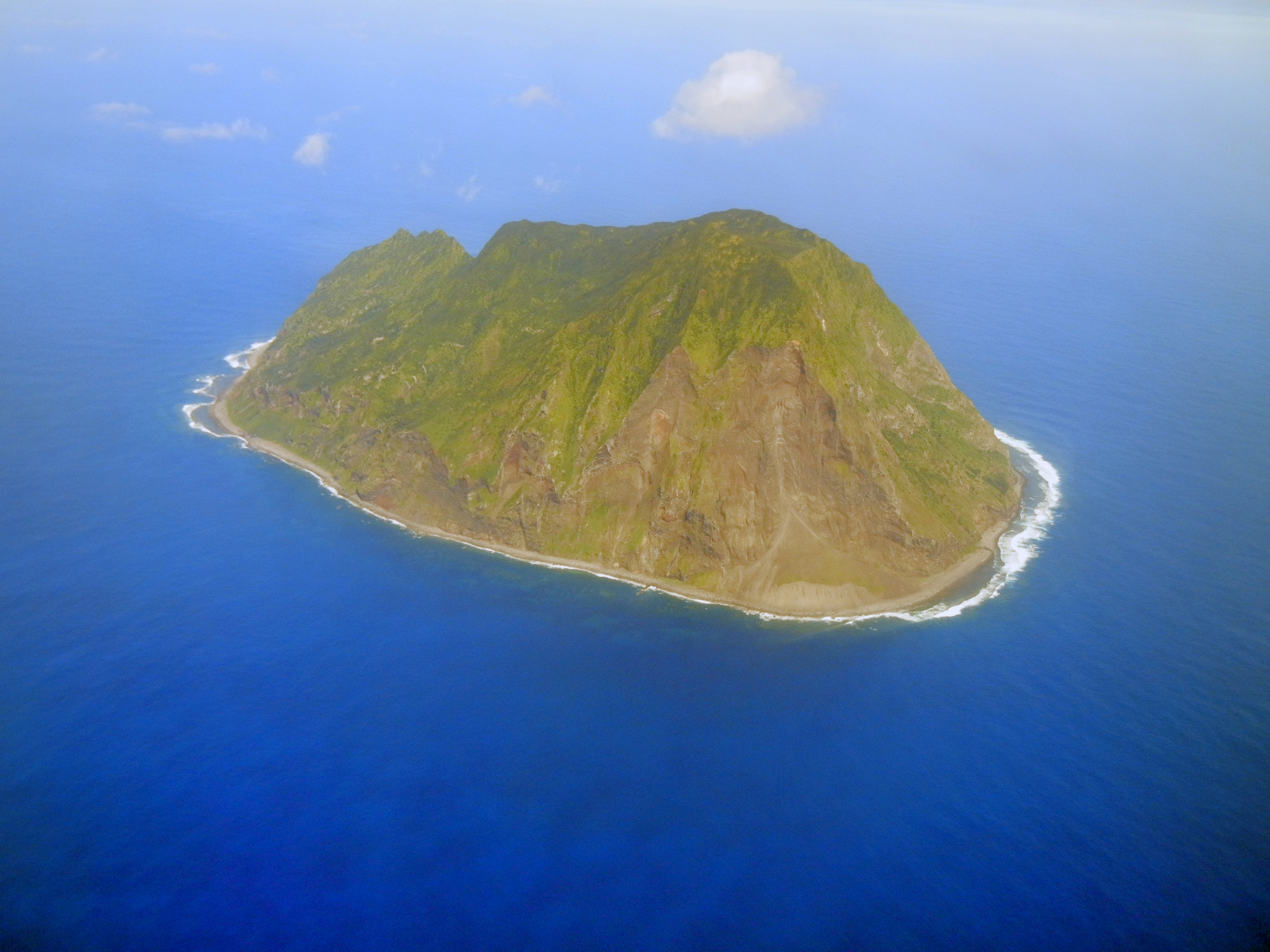
Kita-Ioto Island seen from the SW

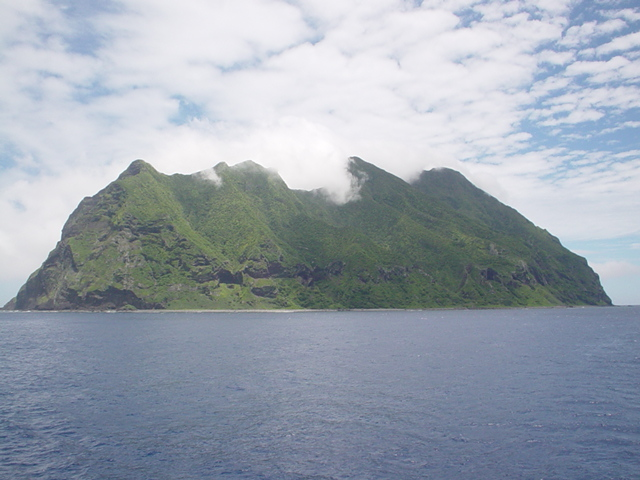
NW side of Kita-Iwojima

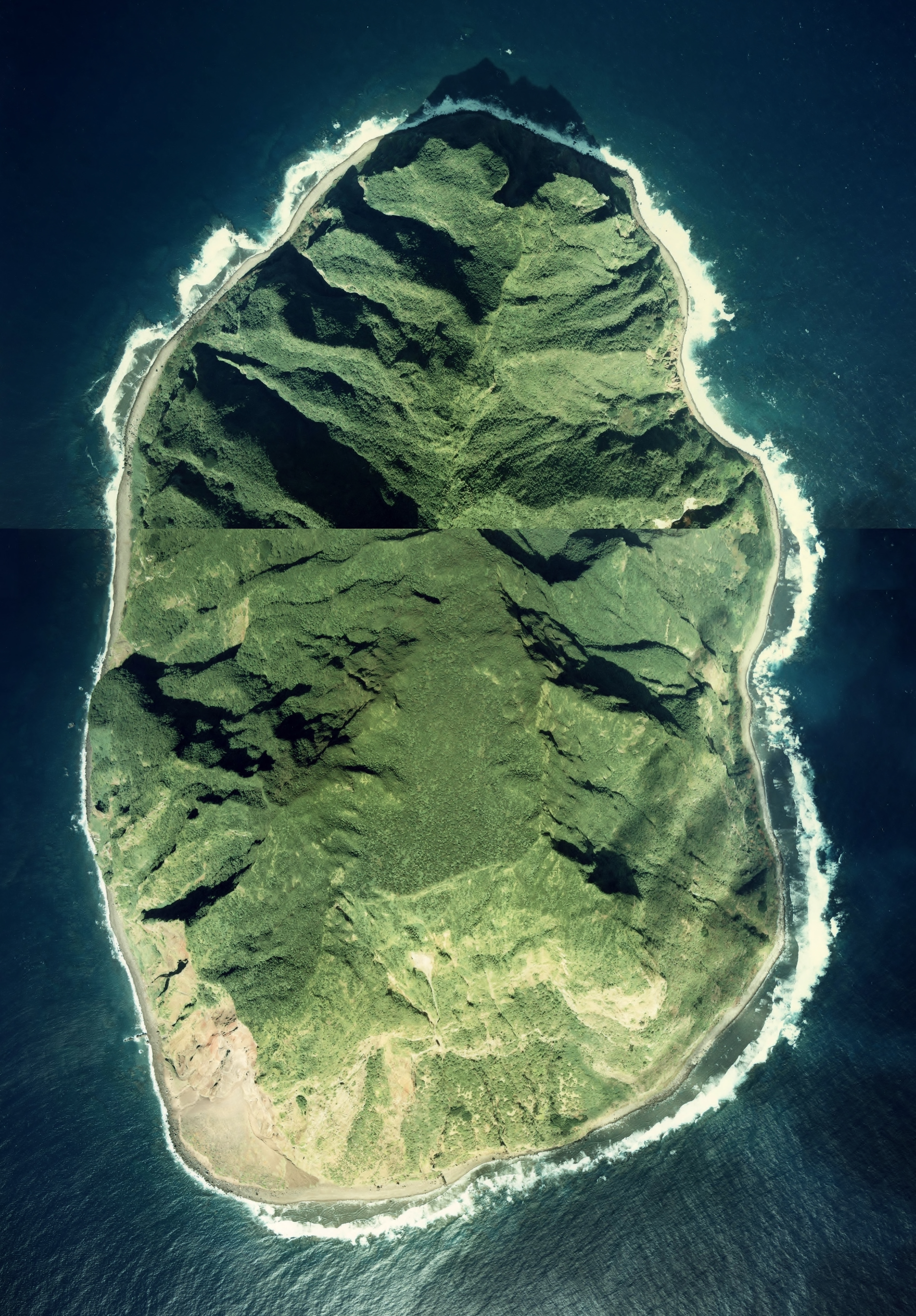
Top down view of Kita-Ioto Island

== See also ==
- Desert island
- List of islands
