= Iwo Jima =

One of the Japanese Volcano Islands

Iwo Tō (Iwo Jima)
Native name: 硫黄島
- Photo of Iwo Jima (Iōtō), c. 2016, with Mount Suribachi in the lower left hand corner

- Location within Japan Location within North Pacific Location within Asia

Geography
- Location: Pacific Ocean
- Coordinates: 24°46′49″N 141°19′28″E
- Archipelago: Volcano Islands
- Area: 29.86 km^{2} (11.53 sq mi)
- Highest elevation: 172 m (564 ft)
- Highest point: Mount Suribachi

Administration
- Japan
- Prefecture: Tokyo
- Subprefecture: Ogasawara
- Village: Ogasawara

Demographics
- Population: No native population (military personnel only)

Iwo Jima (Japanese: 硫黄島, Hepburn: Iōjima; English: /ˌiː.woʊ.ˈdʒiː.mə/, Japanese: [ì.ó̞ó̞.(ɟ̟͡)ʑí.mä́], lit. 'Sulfur Island'), officially named Iwo Tō (硫黄島, Iōtō (Note: Locally, and officially nationwide as of 2007.); [ì.ó̞ó̞.tó̞ó̞]), is one of the Japanese Volcano Islands, which lie south of the Bonin Islands and together with them make up the Ogasawara Archipelago. Together with the Izu Islands, they make up Japan's Nanpō Islands. Although 1,200 km (750 mi) south of Tokyo on Honshu, Iwo Jima is administered as part of the Ogasawara Subprefecture of the Tokyo Metropolitan Government.

Only 21 square kilometers (8.1 sq mi) in size, the island is still volcanic and emits sulfurous gases. The highest point of Iwo Jima is Mount Suribachi at 169 m (554 ft) high. Although likely passed by Micronesians who made their way to the Bonins to the north, Iwo Jima was largely ignored by the Spanish, Dutch, British, and Japanese until a relatively late date after its 1543 rediscovery. The Japanese eventually colonized the island, administering it as the Ioto or Iojima Village under Tokyo's jurisdiction until all civilians were forcibly evacuated to Honshu in July 1944 near the end of World War II.

Because it was able to provide secure airfields within easy range of the Japanese Home Islands, Iwo Jima was not passed by like other Pacific fortresses; instead, the Battle of Iwo Jima between February and March 1945 was some of the fiercest fighting of the Pacific War, with Imperial Japan and the United States both suffering over 20,000 casualties. Joe Rosenthal's photograph of the second flagraising on Mount Suribachi has become one of the most famous examples of wartime photojournalism and an iconic American image. Following the Japanese surrender, the US military occupied Iwo Jima along with the other Nanpo Islands and the Ryukyus; Iwo Jima was returned to Japan with the Bonins in 1968.

Now technically part of the territory and municipal jurisdiction of Ogasawara Village, the island still has no permanent inhabitants except a Self-Defense Force base on its Central Field. Its soldiers, sailors, and airmen receive their own services from Ayase or Sayama but provide emergency assistance to communities on the Bonins who are still connected with the mainland only by an infrequent day-long ferry. As of 1991, the land of Iwo Jima was owned by six individuals, the Village of Ogasawara, and the Government of Japan. Additionally, at least eight individuals held leasehold interests in certain parts of the land owned by the village. The North Kanto Defense Bureau of the Ministry of Defense pays rent on the land lease to the individual owners and leaseholders.

The area of Iwo Jima continues to increase due to the uplift of the ground due to active volcanic activity; in 1911 it was 19.3 square kilometers (7.5 sq mi), in 1945 it was 20.3 square kilometers (7.8 sq mi), in 2014 it was 23.73 square kilometers (9.16 sq mi) and in 2023, it was 29.86 square kilometers (11.53 sq mi).

== Name ==
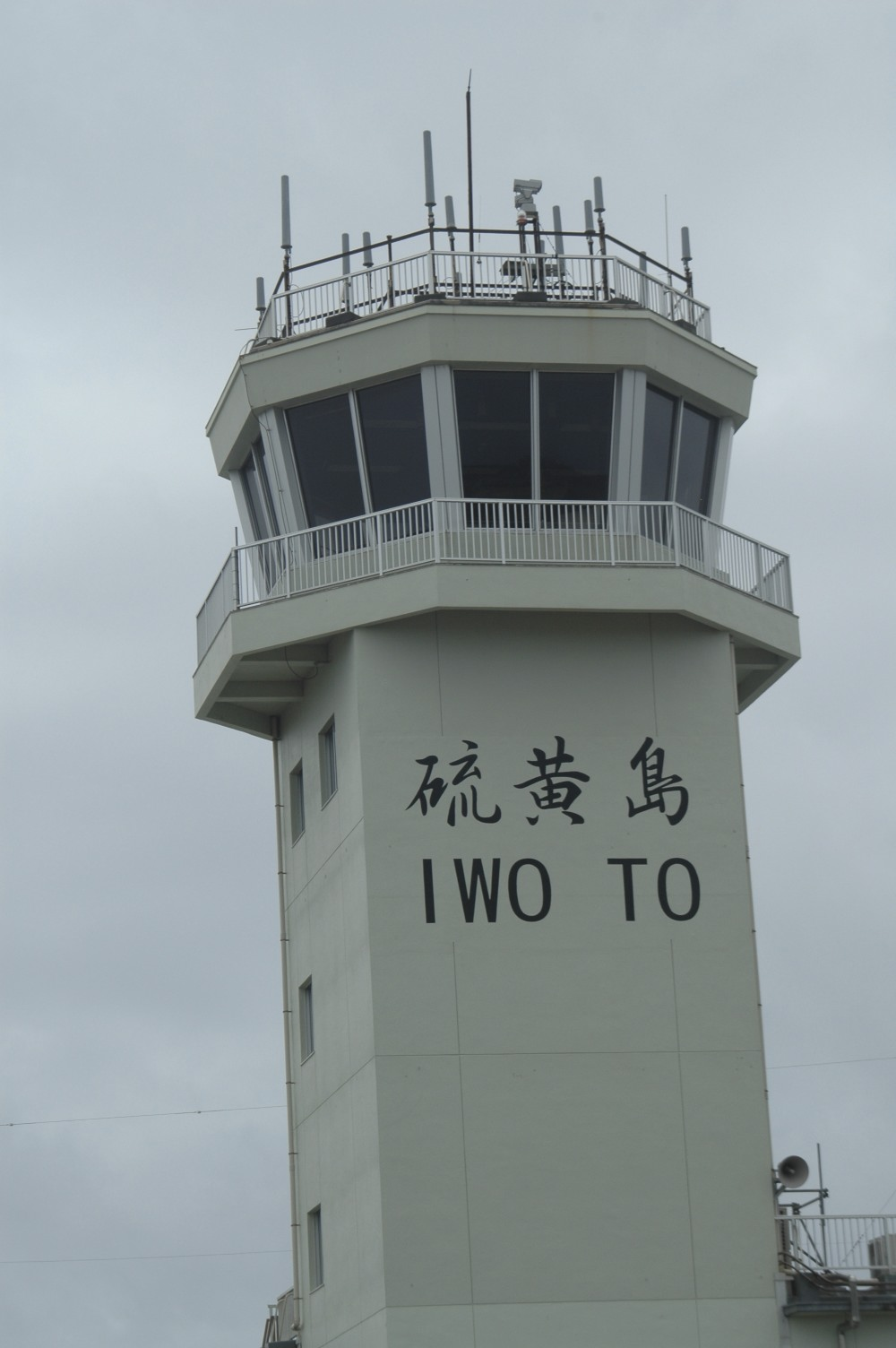
The island's SDF airport control tower (2010)

The original records of De la Torre's 1543 expedition have been lost, but he does not appear to have separately named Iwo Jima, despite later sources sometimes miscrediting him with the name Sulfur or Sulphur Island (orig. Isla Sufre or de Sufre). Instead, he seems to have only named the Volcano Islands as a group (orig. Balcones) after an eruption—probably on South Iwo Jima—active as his ship passed through the area.

Other Spanish explorers may have named or renamed the island in the years afterward. Certainly, John Gore was aware of Spanish accounts of the area with him when he visited in 1779 and recorded its English name as Sulphur Island.

The name was subsequently calqued into Late Middle Japanese with the Sino-Japanese form and pronunciation Iwau-tau (硫黄島, イワウタウ, "Sulfur Island"), still romanized as Iwōtō on the control tower for the remaining airport.

The native Japanese reading of the same character 島 is shima, which typically shifts to jima when preceded by another character. This reading was reinforced during the Second World War, when it was mistakenly used by Japanese naval officers who arrived to fortify the island ahead of US invasion, and is the source of the English name "Iwojima" (also rendered "Iwo-jima" and "Iwo Jima"), which is pronounced /ˌiːwoʊˈdʒiːmə/ or /ˌiːwəˈdʒiːmə/.

In modern Japanese, the /au/ has assimilated to /ō/ and the /w/ has dropped out, with the phonetic spelling イオウトウ Iōtō formally adopted following Japan's 1946 orthography reform. This newer form is sometimes borrowed into English as /ˌiːoʊˈdʒiːmə/ and /ˌiːəˈdʒiːmə/. The high-profile Clint Eastwood films Flags of Our Fathers and Letters from Iwo Jima revived complaints from prewar residents about continued misreading of 島 in the island's name as jima, particularly within Japanese. After formal debate, the Japanese Ministry of Land, Infrastructure, Transport, and Tourism's Geographical Survey Institute formally announced on 18 June 2007 that the official pronunciation would return to Iōtō. 硫黄島, pronounced Iōjima, is the name of a different island in Kagoshima.

== Geography ==
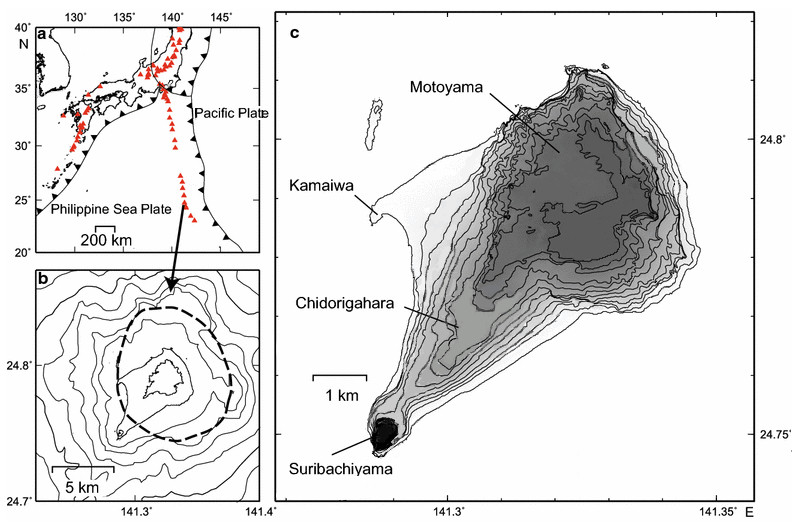
Location map of Iwo Jima

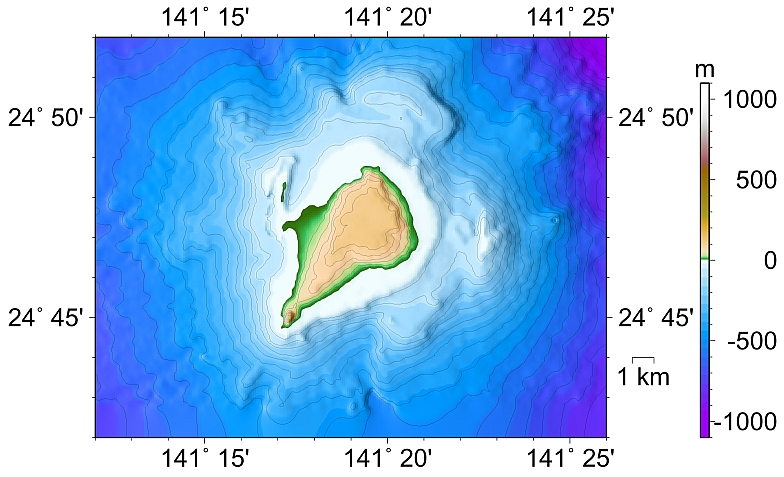
Bathymetric chart around Iwo Jima (by the Japan Coast Guard)

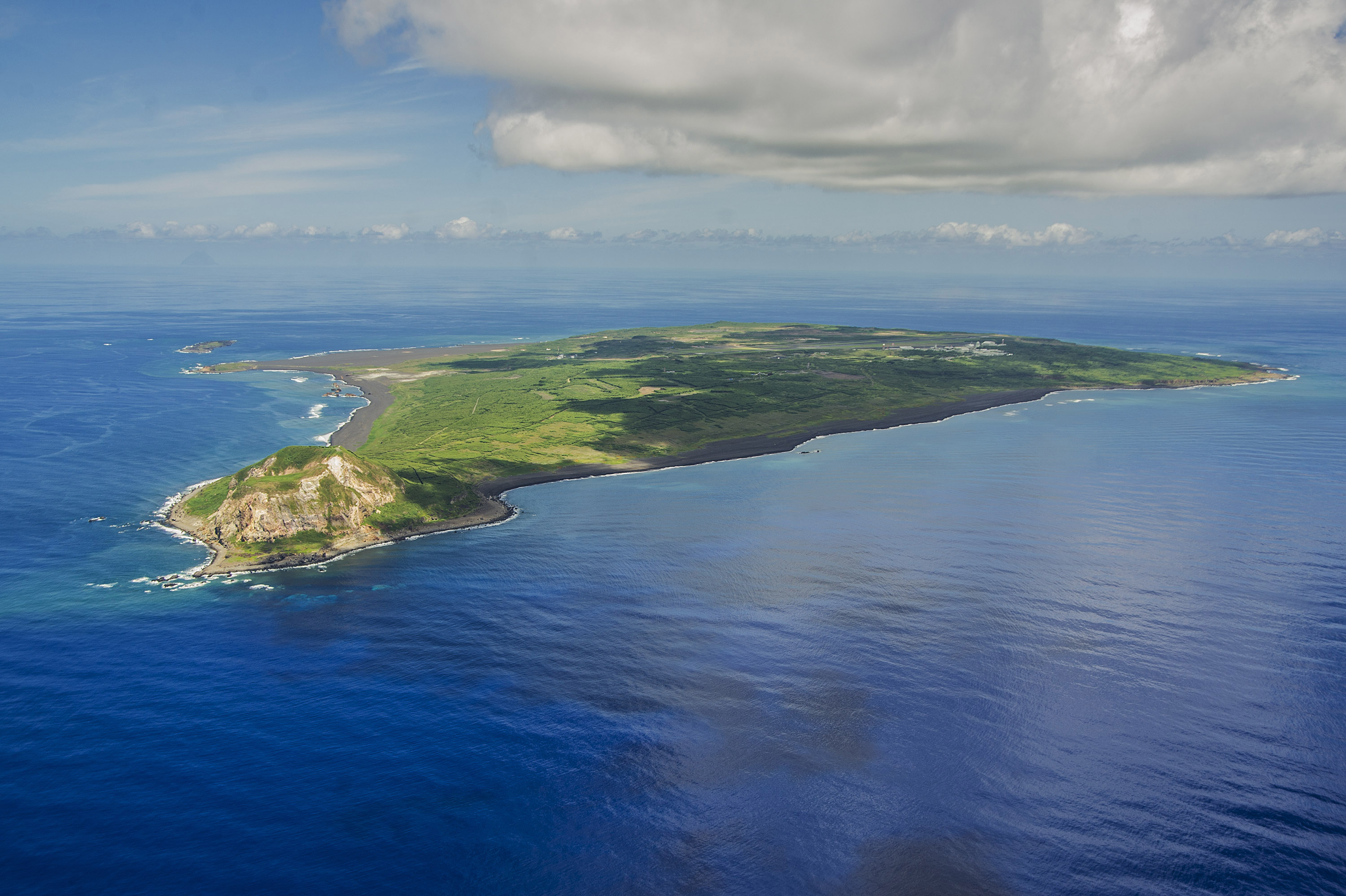
Aerial view of Iwo Jima in 2014

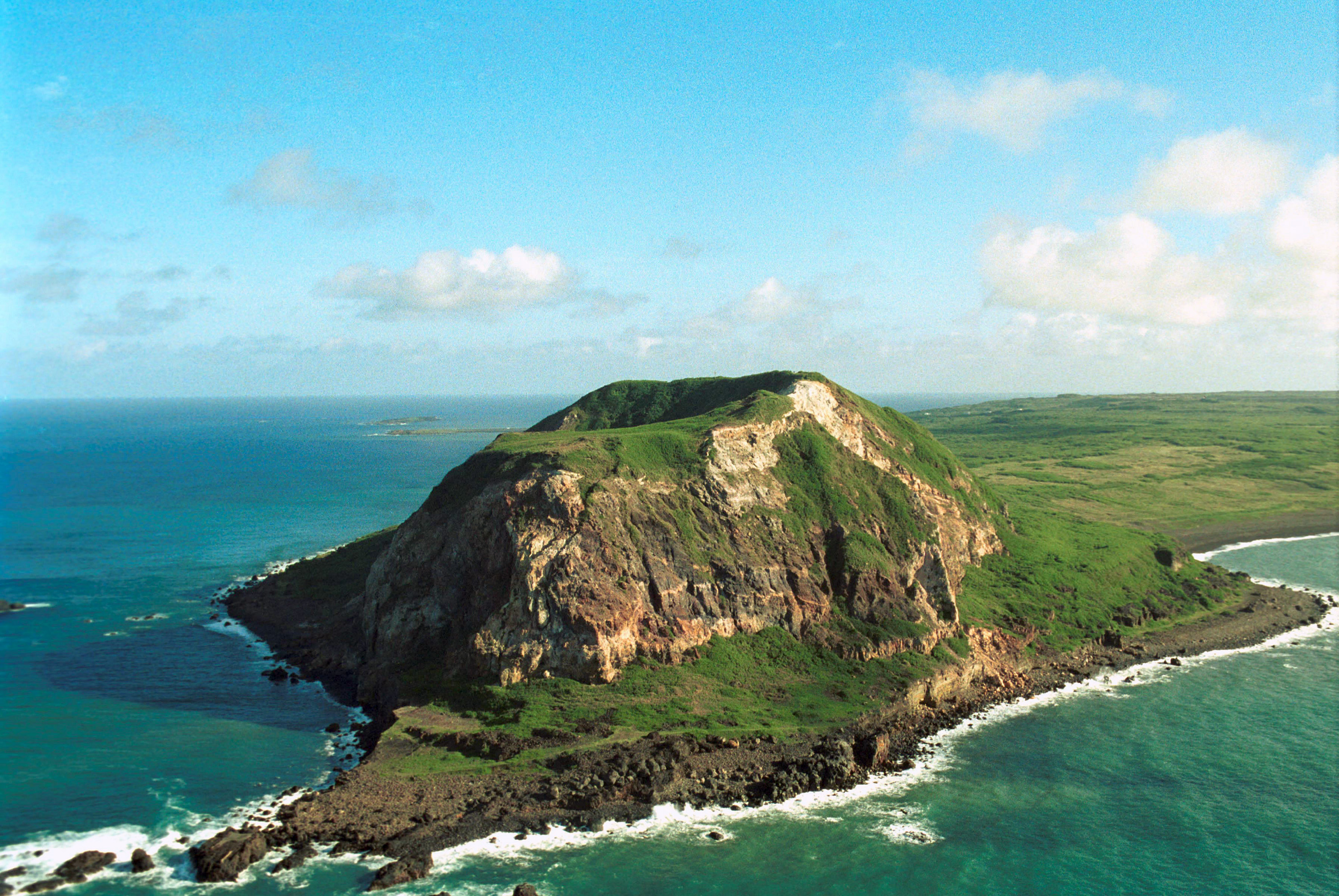
Mount Suribachi on Iwo Jima

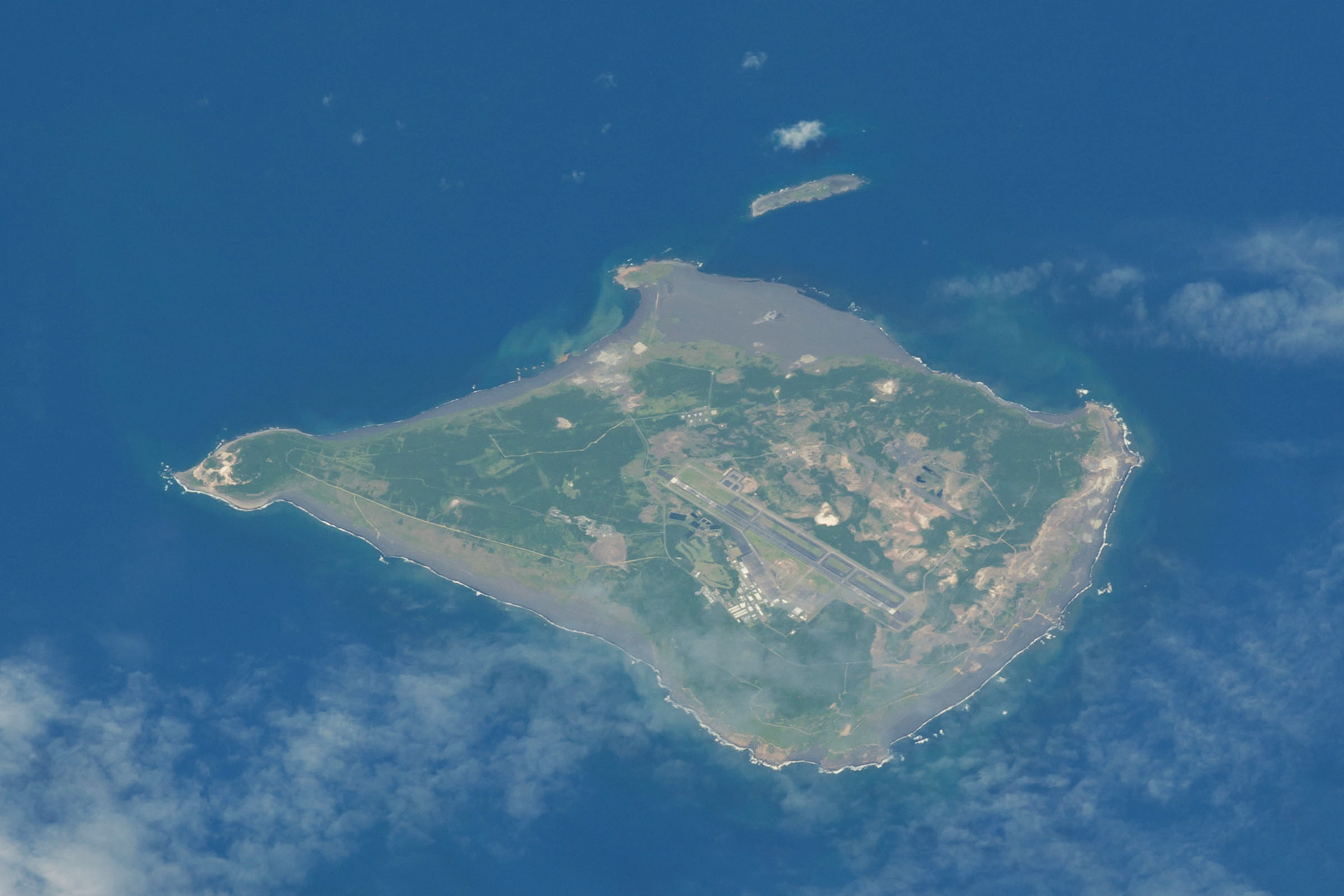
Iwo Jima from the International Space Station in 2016

Iwo Jima has an approximate area of 21 km^{2} (8 sq mi; 5,189 acres). The most prominent feature is Mount Suribachi on the southern tip, a vent that is thought to be dormant and is 161 m (528 ft) high. Named after a Japanese grinding bowl, the summit of Mount Suribachi is the highest point on the island. Iwo Jima is unusually flat and featureless for a volcanic island. Suribachi is the only obvious volcanic feature, as the island is only the resurgent dome (raised centre) of a larger submerged volcanic caldera surrounding the island. The island forms part of the Kazan-retto islands Important Bird Area (IBA), designated by BirdLife International.

80 km (43 nautical miles, 50 mi) north of the island is North Iwo Jima (北硫黄島, Kita-Iō-tō; literally: "North Sulfur Island") and 59 km (37 mi; 32 nmi) south is South Iwo Jima (南硫黄島, Minami-Iō-tō; "South Sulfur Island"); these three islands make up the Volcano Islands group of the Ogasawara Islands. Just south of Minami-Iō-jima are the Mariana Islands.

The visible island stands on a plateau (probably made by wave erosion) at depth about 15 m, which is the top of an underwater mountain 1.5 km to 2 km tall and 40 km diameter at base.

=== Eruption history ===
Iwo Jima has a history of minor volcanic activity a few times per year (fumaroles, and their resultant discolored patches of seawater nearby). In November 2015, Iwo Jima was placed first in a list of ten dangerous volcanoes, with volcanologists saying there was a one in three chance of a large eruption from one of the ten this century.

==== Prehistoric ====
- Earlier: An undersea volcano started, and built up into a volcanic island. It was truncated, either by caldera-forming eruption or by sea erosion.
- About 760±20 BC: a large eruption with pyroclastic flows and lava destroyed a previous forested island
- 131±20BC and 31±20 BC: carbon-14 date of seashells found buried in lava at Motoyama (see map)
- Micronesian tools and carvings found in the Bonin Islands to the north suggest Iwo Jima may have been visited or inhabited as well. With limited archaeological access, however, no such remains have been found to date.

==== Witnessed ====
- 1543: Commanding the San Juan de Letrán, the Spanish explorer Bernardo de la Torre almost certainly sighted Iwo Jima and the other Volcano Islands at some point between September 25 and October 2 while making another failed attempt to sail east across the Pacific from the Philippines to New Spain. (No attempt would be successful until 1565.) Attempting to secure reinforcements for Ruy López de Villalobos when Filipino resistance proved unexpectedly strong, De la Torre apparently passed the islands during an eruption on South Iwo Jima, realized his supply of water would be insufficient for completing his mission, and returned south to rendezvous with López de Villalobos in the Moluccas. Over the next century, other Spanish sailors passed the islands—particularly once Alonso de Arellano found a safe northeastern route back to Mexico from the Philippines—without settling or formally claiming them. The Volcano Islands did, however, form part of the notional boundaries between the Spanish and Portuguese Empires in the Eastern Hemisphere following the treaties of Tordesillas and Zaragoza, such that the Spanish considered them within their sphere of influence.
- 15 November 1779: Following British captain James Cook's death on Hawaii, ships previously under his command landed on Iwo Jima during the return voyage from his 3rd expedition. Under James King and John Gore, the expedition's surveying crew mapped the island, recording a beach at sea level which was 40 m (131 ft) above sea level by 2015 due to volcanic uplifting. Such uplifting occurs on the island at a varying rate of between 100 and 800 mm (3.9 and 31.5 in) per year, with an average rate of 200 mm (8 in) per year. Gore's visit was sometimes misunderstood or misrepresented as a new discovery, as in the report in the December 1786 supplement to The New London Magazine:
  “On the 14th [of October 1779], they discovered an island, about five miles long, lying in lat. 24d. 48m. long. 141d. 12m. On the south point of this is a high barren hill, which evidently presented a volcanic crater. The earth, rock, or sand (for it was not easy to distinguish of which its surface is composed) exhibited various colours; and a considerable part was conjectured to be sulphur, both from its appearance to the eye, and the strong sulphureous smell, perceived as they approached the point; and some thought they saw steams rising from the top of the hill. From these circumstances, Captain Gore gave it name of Sulphur Island.”
- Early 1945: United States armed forces landed on a beach which by 2015 was 17 m (56 ft) above sea level due to volcanic uplift.
- 28 March 1957: A phreatic eruption occurred without warning 2 km (1.2 mi) northeast of Suribachi, lasting 65 minutes and ejecting material 30 m (98 ft) high from one crater. Another crater, 30 m (98 ft) wide and 15 m (49 ft) deep, formed by collapse 50 minutes after the eruption ended.
- 9–10 March 1982: Five phreatic eruptions occurred from vents on the northwest shore of the island.
- 21 September 2001: A submarine eruption began from three vents southeast of Iwo-jima. It built a 10 m (33 ft) diameter pyroclastic cone.
- October 2001: A small phreatic eruption at Idogahama (a beach on the northwest coast of the island) made a crater 10 m (33 ft) wide and 2–3 metres (6.6–9.8 ft) deep.
- May 2012: Fumaroles, and discolored patches of seawater were seen northeast of the island, indicating further submarine activity.
- May to June 2013: Series of smaller volcanic earthquakes.
- April 2018: A number of volcanic earthquakes, high white plumes up to 700 m (2,300 ft).
- 30 October to 5 November 2019: Volcanic quakes and subaerial eruption.
- 29 April to 5 May 2020: Subaerial eruption and volcanic plume rising up to 1 km (0.62 mi) in height.
- 8 September to 6 October 2020: Volcanic plume up to 1 km (0.62 mi) in height and a minor eruption.
- 24 November 2021: Small phreatic eruption occurred with the ash plume height yet to be known.

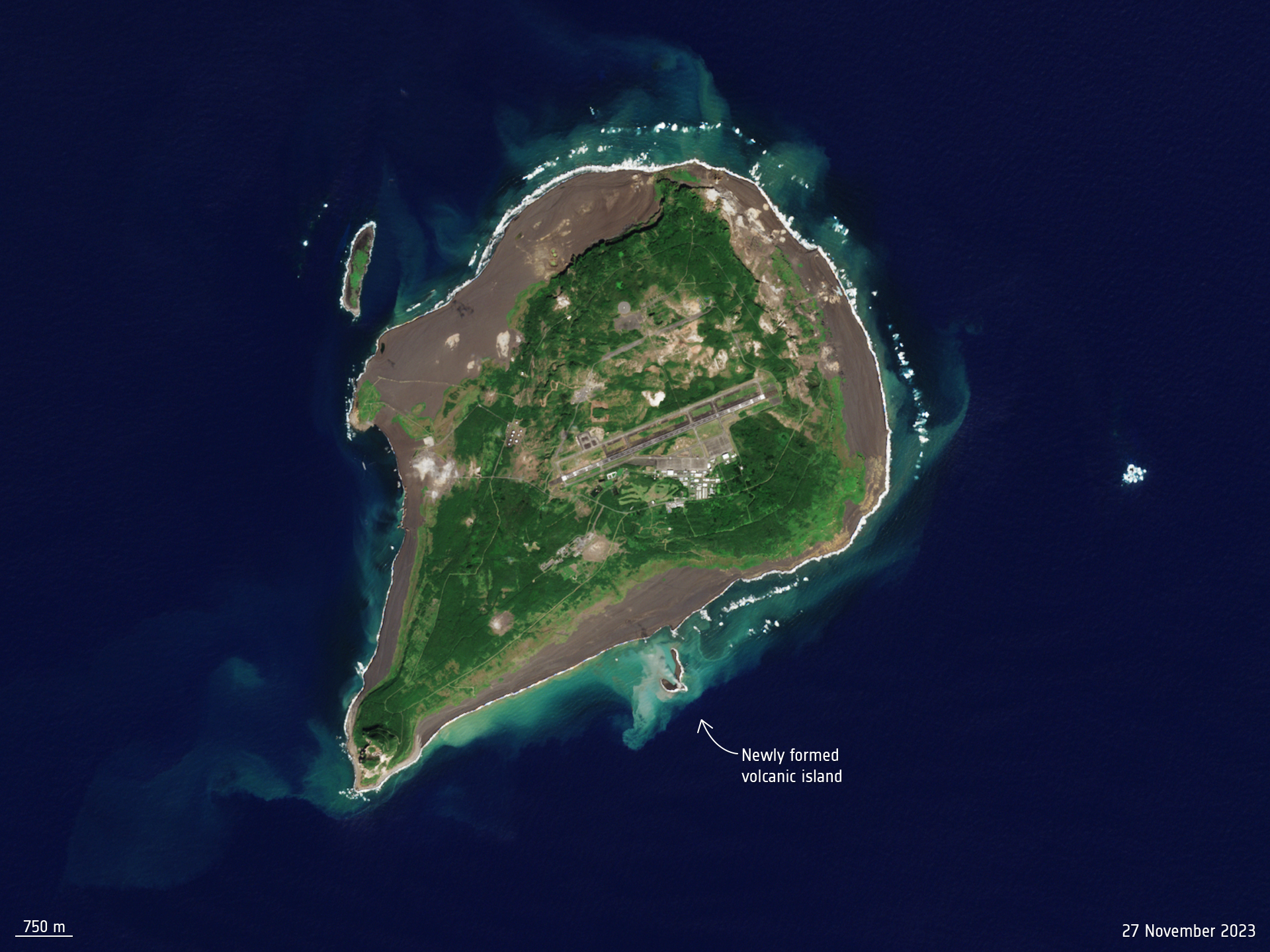
Aerial view showing the location of 'Niijima' off of Iwoto from the ESA Copernicus Sentinel-2 satellite

On 11 July 2022, the first magmatic eruption in over 1000 years began just offshore. The article was cited as saying "Officials of the National Research Institute for Earth Science and Disaster Resilience (NIED) visited the site between July 12 and July 15 and observed volcanic eruptions every five minutes, which created water columns tens of meters high and spewed black smoke. The officials also observed many rocks that had washed ashore on the coast of Iwoto island. There were small cavities inside the rocks. The officials believe they are cooled lava, formed after magma has erupted, quickly cooled and solidified. The temperature on the inside of some of the rocks was as high as 120 degrees, according to the officials."

At the beginning of November 2023, a series of continuous eruptions of material resulted in a new islet breaking the surface and beginning to grow. Following continuous volcanic activity since the initial eruption the island now dubbed Niijima, Japanese for 'new island', has continued to grow and is now visible from space.

==== Volcanological external links ====
- 6 cross sections of stages in the c. 760±20 BC eruption
- SW-NE geological cross section through Suribachiyama

=== Climate ===
Iwo Jima has a tropical savanna climate (Aw) with long, hot summers and warm winters with mild nights.

Climate data for Iwo Jima
Month	Jan	Feb	Mar	Apr	May	Jun	Jul	Aug	Sep	Oct	Nov	Dec	Year
Mean daily maximum °C (°F)	22 (71)	22 (71)	23 (73)	26 (78)	28 (82)	29 (85)	30 (86)	30 (86)	30 (86)	29 (84)	27 (80)	24 (75)	27 (80)
Mean daily minimum °C (°F)	17 (63)	17 (63)	18 (65)	21 (69)	23 (74)	25 (77)	26 (78)	26 (78)	26 (78)	24 (76)	23 (73)	19 (67)	22 (72)
Average precipitation mm (inches)	7.6 (0.3)	7.6 (0.3)	46 (1.8)	110 (4.2)	110 (4.4)	99 (3.9)	180 (7.1)	170 (6.6)	110 (4.4)	170 (6.6)	120 (4.9)	110 (4.5)	1,380 (54.4)

== History ==
=== Pre-1945 ===
The island was first visited by a Westerner in October 1543, by Spanish sailor Bernardo de la Torre on board the carrack San Juan de Letrán when trying to return from Sarangani to New Spain.

In the late 16th century, the island was discovered by the Japanese.

Before World War II Iwo Jima was administered as Iōjima village and was (and is today) part of Tokyo. A census in June 1943 reported an island civilian population of 1,018 (533 males, 485 females) in 192 households in six settlements. The island had a primary school, a Shinto shrine, and one police officer; it was serviced by a mail ship from Haha-jima once a month, and by Nippon Yusen ship once every two months. The island's economy relied upon sulfur mining, sugarcane farming, and fishing; an isolated island in the middle of the Pacific Ocean with poor economic prospects, Iwo Jima had to import all rice and consumer goods from the Home Islands.

Even before the beginning of World War II, there was a garrison of the Imperial Japanese Navy at the southern part of Iwo Jima. It was off-limits to the island's civilian population, who already had little contact with the naval personnel, except for trading.

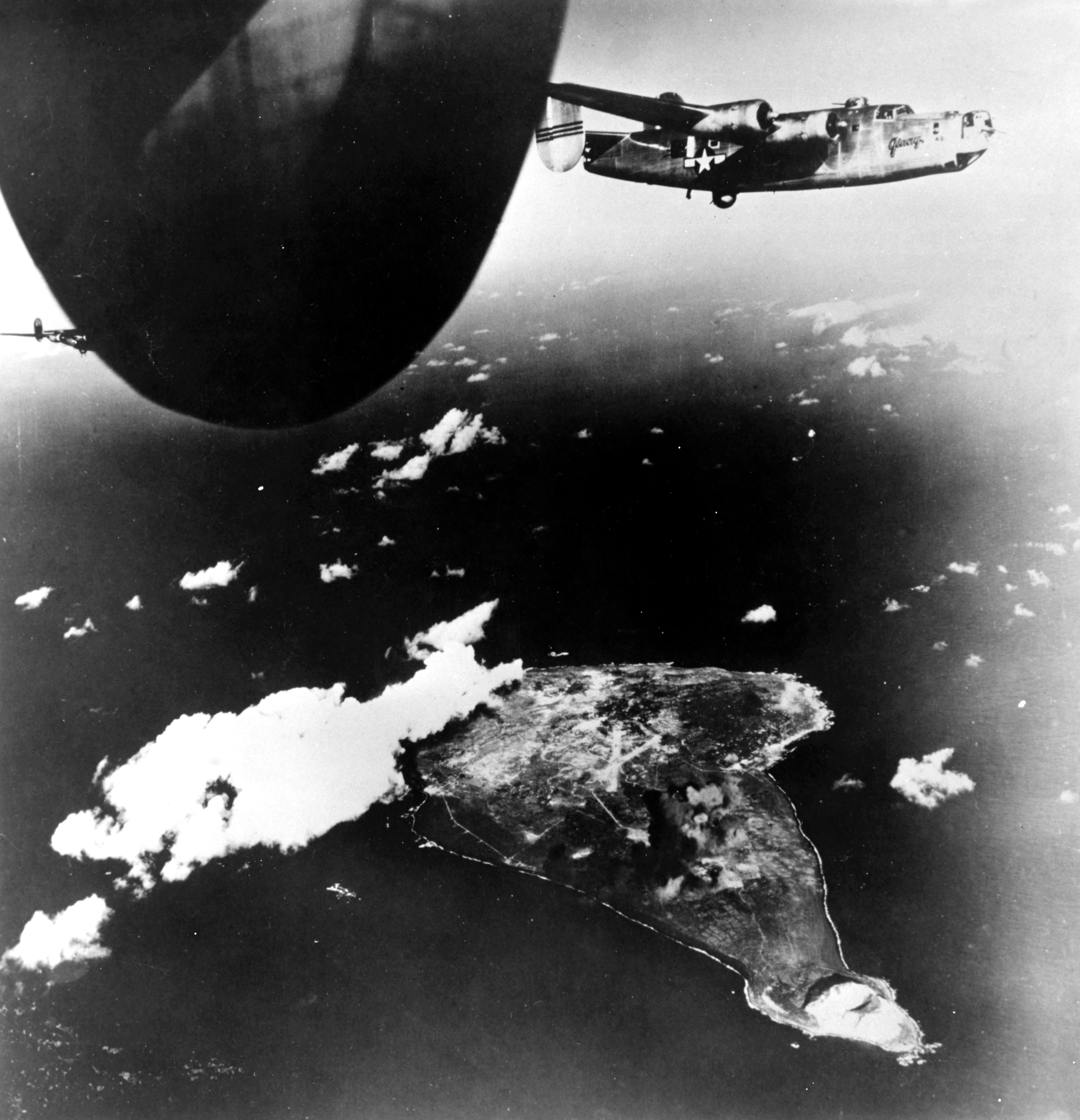
B-24 Liberators after attacking Iwo Jima on December 15, 1944

Throughout 1944, Japan conducted a massive military buildup on Iwo Jima in anticipation of a U.S. invasion. In July 1944, the island's civilian population was forcibly evacuated, and no civilians have permanently settled on the island since.

War-displaced islanders who are now in their 80s and older longed to return to the island, which they considered "a special place associated with memories both happy and sad". Their repeated requests to return to the island have not been realized given the reason that the area has a dynamic volcanic activity. Former islanders and their family members, however, are occasionally granted permission to visit the graves of their ancestors. Islanders and their descendants are trying to write down their memories, interview other former islanders, and create "a digital archive of photos to preserve memories of life on the now-forbidden island to pass them down to posterity" for younger generations who may not appreciate that Iwo Jima was once a place many had called home.

=== Battle of Iwo Jima ===
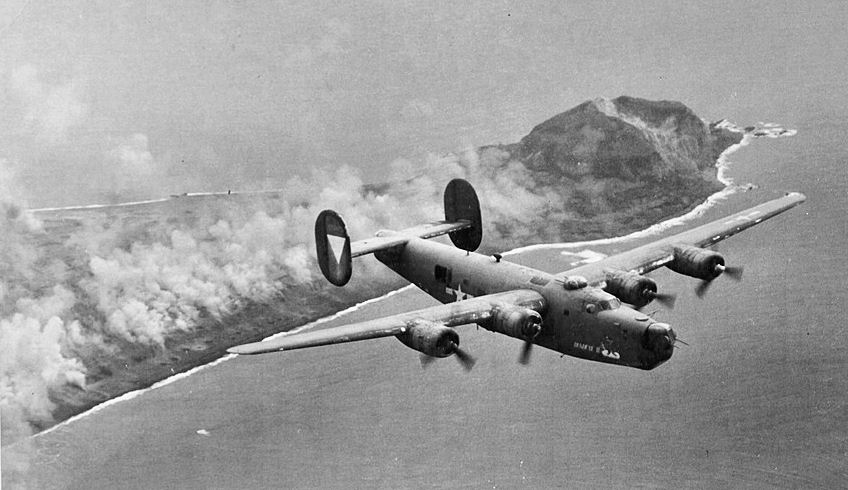
B-24 Liberator flies over Iwo Jima in March 1945

The American invasion of Iwo Jima began on February 19, 1945, and continued to March 26, 1945. The battle was a major initiative of the Pacific Campaign of World War II. The Marine invasion, known as "Operation Detachment", was charged with the mission of capturing the airfields on the island for use by P-51 fighters in relation to the range of the fighters escorting the bombers, and the emergency landings of damaged heavy bombers that were not able to reach their main bases in the Marianas (Guam, Saipan and Tinian). Prior to the seizure, Japanese fighters had harried U.S. bombing missions to Japan.

The battle was marked by some of the fiercest fighting of the war. The Imperial Japanese Army positions on the island were heavily fortified, with vast bunkers, hidden artillery, and 18 kilometers (11 mi) of tunnels. The battle was the first U.S. attack on the Japanese Home Islands and the Imperial soldiers defended their positions tenaciously. Of the 21,000 Japanese soldiers present at the beginning of the battle, over 19,000 were killed and only 1,083 taken prisoner.

One of the first objectives after landing on the beachhead was the taking of Mount Suribachi. At the second raising of a flag on the peak, Joe Rosenthal photographed six Marines raising the United States flag on the fourth day of the battle (February 23).

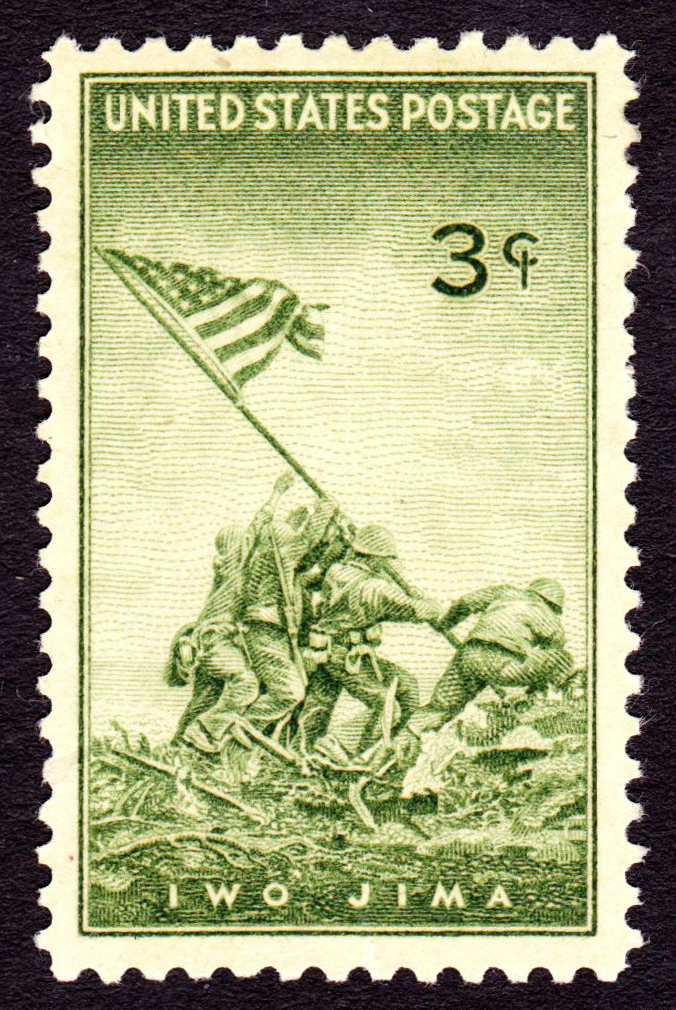
U.S. postage stamp, 1945 issue, commemorating the Battle of Iwo Jima.

The photograph was extremely popular, and won the Pulitzer Prize for Photography that same year. It is regarded as one of the most significant and recognizable images of the war.

After the fall of Mount Suribachi in the south, the Japanese still held a strong position throughout the island. General Tadamichi Kuribayashi still had the equivalent of eight infantry battalions, a tank regiment, two artillery, and three heavy mortar battalions, plus the 5,000 gunners and naval infantry. With the landing area secure, more troops and heavy equipment came ashore and the invasion proceeded north to capture the airfields and the remainder of the island. Most Japanese soldiers fought to the death. On the night of March 25, a 300-man Japanese force launched a final counterattack led by Kuribayashi. The island was officially declared "secured" the following morning.

According to the U.S. Navy, "The 36-day (Iwo Jima) assault resulted in more than 26,000 American casualties, including 6,800 dead." Comparatively, the 82-day Battle of Okinawa lasted from early April until mid-June 1945 and U.S. (five Army, two Marine Corps Divisions and Navy personnel on ships) casualties were over 62,000 of whom over 12,000 were killed or missing, while the Battle of the Bulge lasted 40 days (16 December 1944 – 25 January 1945) with almost 90,000 U.S. casualties comprising 19,000 killed, 47,500 wounded and 23,000 captured or missing.

After Iwo Jima was declared secured, about 3,000 Japanese soldiers were left alive in the island's warren of caves and tunnels. Those who could not bring themselves to commit suicide hid in the caves during the day and came out at night to prowl for provisions. Some did eventually surrender and were surprised that the Americans often received them with compassion – offering them water, cigarettes, or coffee. The last of these stragglers, two of Lieutenant Toshihiko Ohno's men (Ohno's body was never found), Kōfuku Yamakage and Rikio Matsudo, lasted three and a half years, surrendering on January 6, 1949.

In memory of the battle, three ships of the U.S. Navy have been named USS Iwo Jima:

- USS Iwo Jima (CV-46), a planned Essex-class aircraft carrier which began construction in early 1945, but cancelled in August 1945 with the end of the war. It was eventually scrapped in 1949.
- USS Iwo Jima (LPH-2), the lead ship of the Iwo Jima-class amphibious assault ships, served from 1961 to 1993, and scrapped in 1995.
- USS Iwo Jima (LHD-7), a Wasp-class amphibious assault ship, commissioned in 2001 and in active service as of 2025.

=== U.S. Naval Base Iwo Jima ===
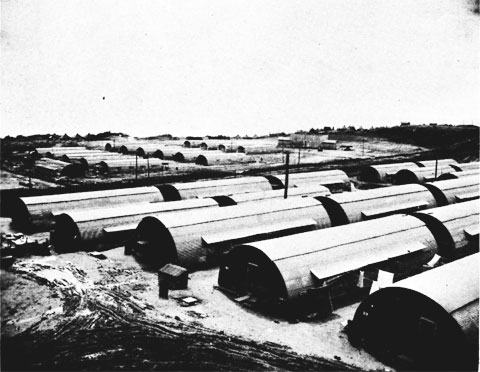
Navy Carrier Aircraft Service Unit (CASU 52) camp and Administration Area, constructed by the 90th Seabees in 1945

The U.S. military occupied Iwo Jima until June 26, 1968, when it was returned to Japan. The United States Navy built and operated a naval base on the island.

==== U.S. nuclear arms base ====
Between 1956 and 1959, it is claimed that US Military forces stored at least one nuclear weapon at Iwo Jima, with some nuclear components being stored on the island until 1966. This made Iwo Jima one of several islands hosting nuclear weapons during the US Military Occupation of Japan. The claim was initially made by authors at the Bulletin of the Atomic Scientists, parsing heavily redacted declassified documents.

On December 12, 1999, U.S. Under Secretary for Defense Policy Walter Slocombe told The New York Times, "Our position is that there have been no violations of our obligations under the security treaty and related arrangements."

Norris, Arkin and Burr, authors at the Bulletin of the Atomic Scientists, however, concluded:

There were nuclear weapons on Chichi Jima and Iwo Jima (Iwo To)... Chichi Jima, Iwo Jima, and Okinawa were under U.S. occupation, that the bombs stored on the mainland lacked their plutonium and/ or uranium cores... This elaborate stratagem maintained the technicality that the United States had no nuclear weapons "in Japan."

=== Japanese military base ===
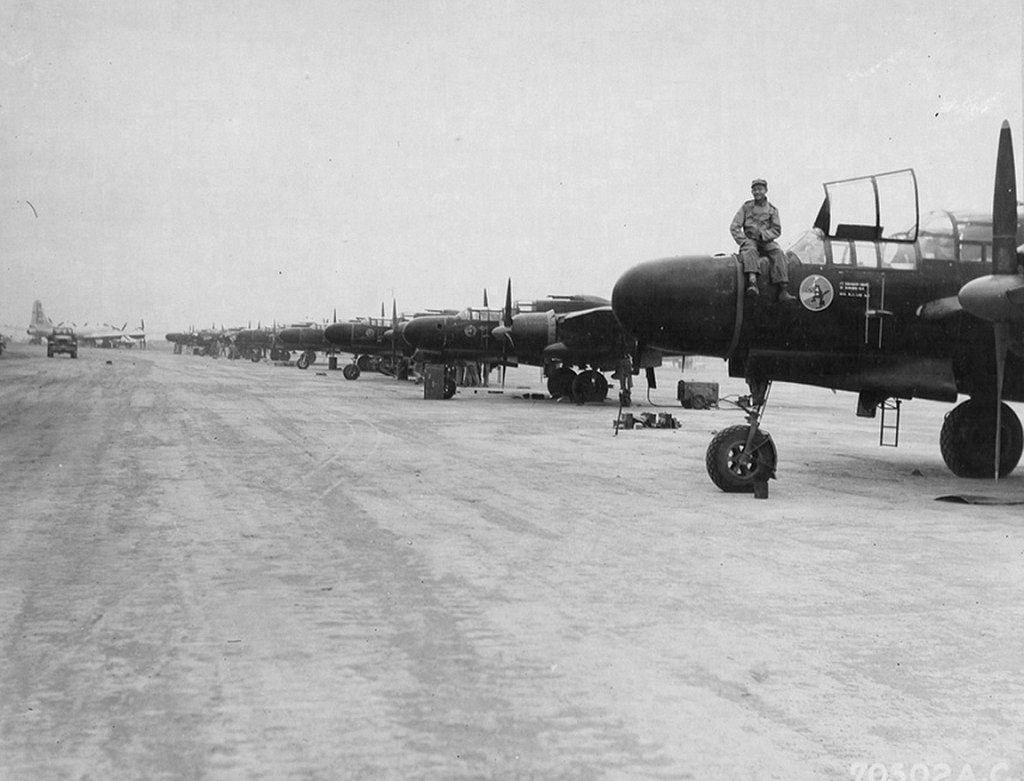
P-61 Black Widows line Central Field, 1945

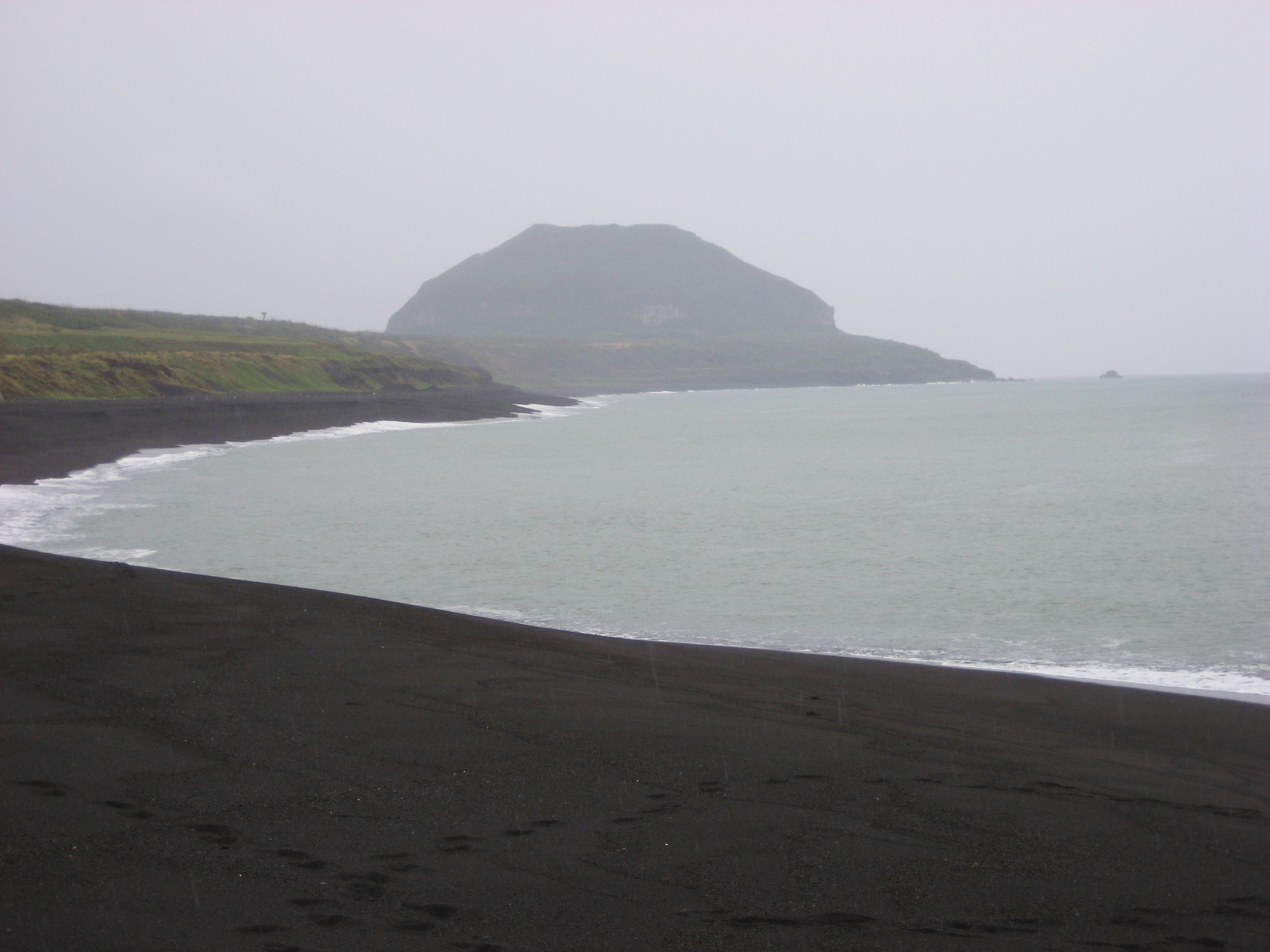
Coast of the island with Suribachi in the distance, 2007

Since returning the island from the U.S. to Japan on June 26, 1968, the Japan Self-Defense Forces (JSDF) maintain a station on Iwo Jima. The Japan Maritime Self-Defense Force (JMSDF) operates a naval air base on the island at Central Field. The airstrip is 2,650 meters (8,700 ft) long and 60 meters (200 ft) wide. The JMSDF is in charge of support, air traffic control, fueling, and rescue. The airstrip is rarely used for emergency landings by commercial airplanes flying transpacific routes (between Northeast Asia and Saipan, Guam). The IATA airport code of IWO and the ICAO airport code of RJAW are assigned to the airfield. The JMSDF Air Wing 21 Detachment Iōtō provides support for emergency medical air transportation from the Bonin Islands (Chichijima and Hahajima) to Honshu. The base is occasionally used as a relay point for the medical transport. The Japan Air Self-Defense Force also uses the base. The Japan Ground Self-Defense Force is in charge of explosive ordnance disposal, and maintains a garrison of 400 troops on the island. Two abandoned airfields from World War II are nearby, North Field to the north of the current air base, and an unfinished Japanese airfield to the south of the base, which was improved after the U.S. invasion of the island.

The U.S. Navy's Carrier Air Wing Five, based at the United States Marine Corps Air Station Iwakuni when not deployed aboard USS George Washington, also uses the base for field carrier landing practice (FCLP). To justify the U.S. Navy's use of the airfield, the U.S. Navy still nominally has a 1,639-acre (663-ha) disused communication facility (Iwo-Jima Communication Site, FAC3181) on the island under the U.S.–Japan Status of Forces Agreement. The U.S. Coast Guard's Iwo Jima LORAN-C transmitter facility was transferred to Japan in 1993 and demolished in 1994.

Civilian access to the island is restricted to those visiting graves of former residents and attending memorial services for U.S. and Japanese fallen soldiers, construction workers and cafeteria staff for the naval air base, and meteorological, geological and environmental agency officials. The Japanese troops stationed on the island register their residential addresses in Ayase, Kanagawa or Sayama, Saitama for voting, tax, and social security purposes. Officially, there is no population on the island.

While large areas of the Bonin Islands are designated as a national park (Ogasawara National Park) as well as inscribed on the UNESCO World Heritage List, Iwo Jima is included neither in the National Park nor the World Heritage natural site because of the military installations.

=== Reunion of Honor ===
The first large scale reunion on the island was held in 1970 on the 25th anniversary of the battle. The event was sponsored by the Fifth Marine Division Association and included both American and Japanese veterans of the battle. Other notable attendees included then Brigadier General William K. Jones commander of the 3rd Marine Division, NBC’s senior correspondent in Asia John Rich, and Yoshitaka Shindō grandson of General Tadamichi Kuribayashi. The widows of General Kuribayashi and Colonel Takeichi Nishi also attended events with American veterans held in Tokyo.

On February 19, 1985, the 40th anniversary of the day that U.S. forces began the assault on the island, veterans from both forces gathered for the Reunion of Honor just a few meters/yards away from the spot where U.S. Marines had landed on the island. During the memorial service a granite plaque was unveiled with the message:

On the 40th anniversary of the battle of Iwo Jima, American and Japanese veterans met again on these same sands, this time in peace and friendship. We commemorate our comrades, living and dead, who fought here with bravery and honor, and we pray together that our sacrifices on Iwo Jima will always be remembered and never be repeated.

It is inscribed on both sides of the plaque, with the English translation facing the beaches where U.S. forces landed and the Japanese translation facing inland, where Japanese troops defended their position.

After that, the Japan–U.S. combination memorial service of the 50th anniversary was held in front of this monument in March 1995. The 55th anniversary was held in 2000, followed by a 60th reunion in March 2005 (see U.S. National Park Service photo below), and a 70th anniversary ceremony on March 21, 2015.

A memorial service held on the island in 2007 got particular attention because it coincided with the release of the movie Letters from Iwo Jima. The joint U.S.–Japanese ceremony was attended by Yoshitaka Shindo, a Japanese lawmaker who is the grandson of the Japanese commander during the battle, Lt. Gen. Tadamichi Kuribayashi, and Yasunori Nishi, the son of Colonel Baron Takeichi Nishi, the Olympic gold medalist equestrian who died commanding a tank unit on the island.

Active Marines have also visited the island on occasion for Professional Military Education (PME).

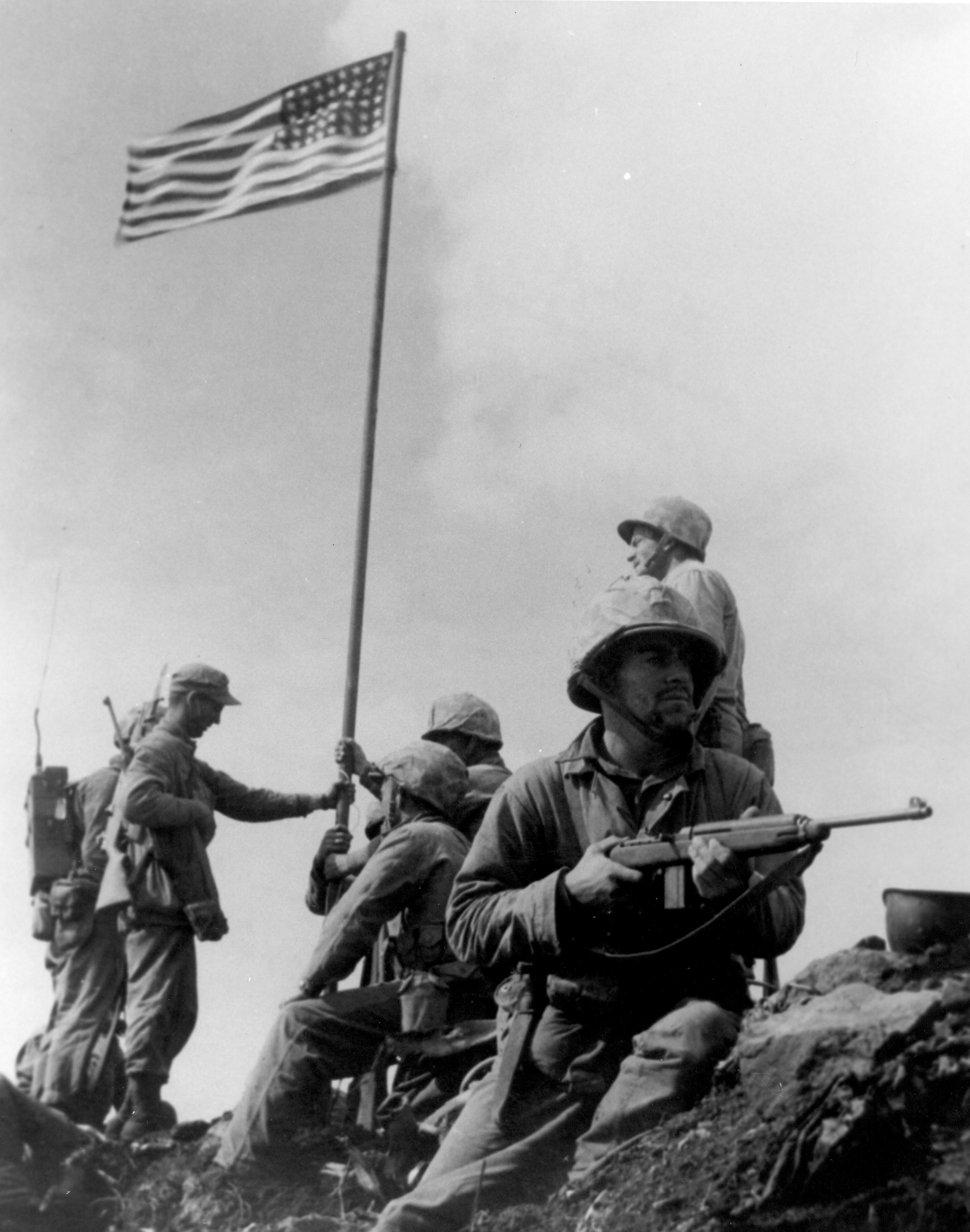
Raising of the first U.S. flag at Iwo Jima

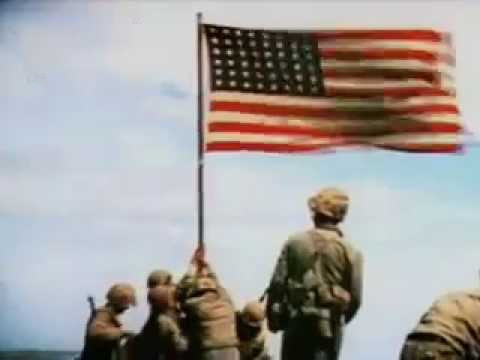
Raising of the second U.S. flag at Iwo Jima

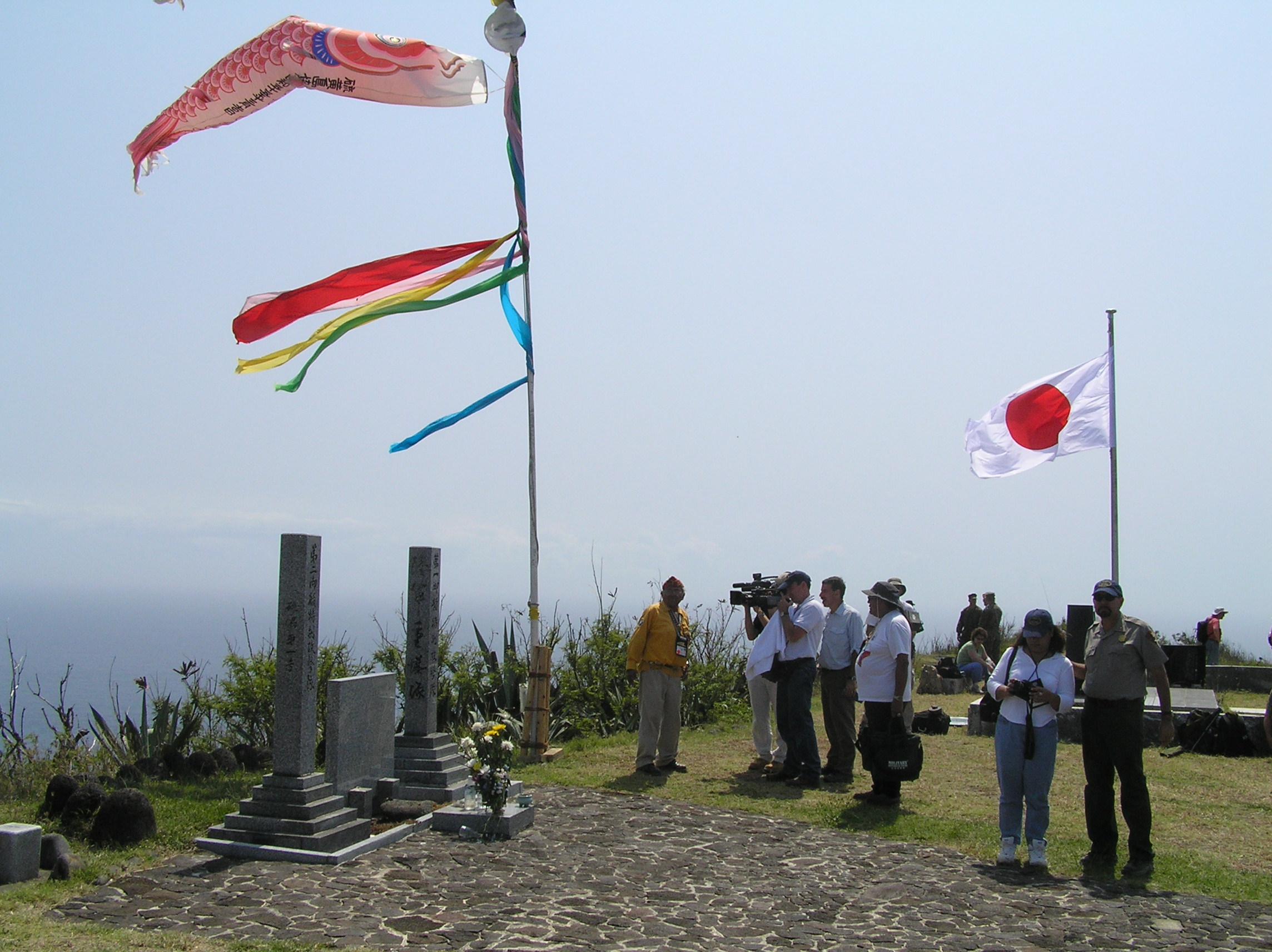
60th Reunion 2005

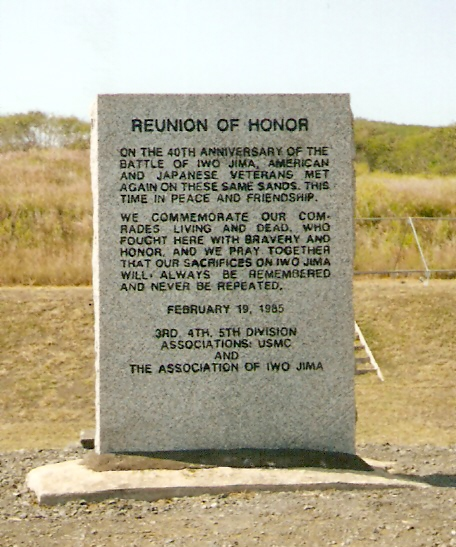
Reunion of Honor Memorial

== See also ==
- List of volcanoes in Japan
- List of islands
- Desert island
- Naval Base Iwo Jima
