= Ogasawara Subprefecture =

Subprefecture of Tokyo Metropolis, Japan

Coordinates: 27°05′44″N 142°11′28″E

Ogasawara Subprefecture 小笠原
- Ogasawara-shichō
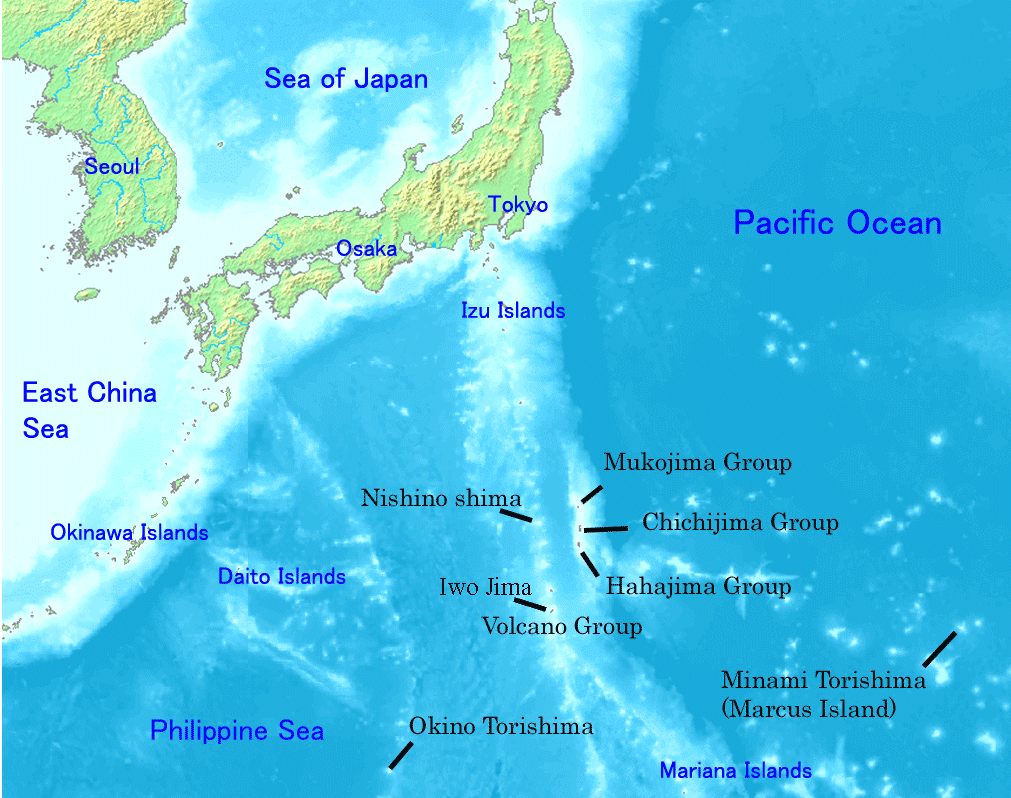
- The islands of Ogasawara Subprefecture follow an oceanic ridge south from the Izu Islands and Tokyo on Honshu in the Japanese Home Islands
- Prefecture: Tokyo Metropolis
- Capital: Ogasawara

Area
  - Total: 104.41 km^{2} (40.31 sq mi)

Population (October 1, 2023)
  - Total: 2,930
  - Density: 28.1/km^{2} (72.7/sq mi)
- Website: Village website

Ogasawara Subprefecture (小笠原支庁, Ogasawara-shichō) is a subprefecture of the Tokyo Metropolitan Government in Japan. The subprefecture covers the Bonin and Volcano Islands and three isolated islets (the "Ogasawara Archipelago") and is coterminous with the village of Ogasawara. The subprefecture covers 104.41 square kilometers (40.31 sq mi) and has a population of 2,930 in 2023. It maintains a main office on Chichijima and a branch office on Hahajima, the two permanent settlements in the islands. (The SDF base on Iwo Jima is supported separately, although still notionally part of the subprefecture and village's jurisdiction.)

== Name ==
The subprefecture bears the Japanese name of the Bonin Islands, derived from an apocryphal 18th-century account of the islands' discovery in 1593 by a member of the Ogasawara clan of samurai. Although the Ogasawara Islands themselves are still more often known as the Bonin Islands in English, a name which originates from a transliteration of an early Japanese word for "uninhabited islands" (bunin-shima or mujin-shima), the modern subprefecture is usually known as Ogasawara.

== History ==
Micronesian tools and carvings have been discovered in the Bonin Islands but in the modern era the islands were uninhabited until 1830, giving rise—through a series of errors—to the English name of the Bonins. The initial settlement of the Bonins was from the Kingdom of Hawaii under the auspices of the British Empire, who formally claimed them in the 1820s before yielding them to the Empire of Japan. The descendants of these initial settlers make up Bonin Islanders.

Once Japanese settlement began, the islands' seven main villages were administered as part of Tokyo's government (Tōkyō-fu). Okinotorishima was added to the subprefecture in 1930, and the villages were finally incorporated in 1940: Ōmura and Ōgimura-Fukurosawa on Chichijima, Kitamura and Okimura on Hahajima, Iōtō on Iwo Jima, and Ishinomura and Nishimura on North Iwo Jima. All civilians on the islands were forcibly evacuated to Honshu in 1944 near the end of World War II.

After the Surrender of Japan in 1945, the United States Armed Forces occupied the Ryukyu and Nanpo Islands, notionally in preparation for a future United Nations trusteeship but chiefly as staging areas for nuclear weapons. During this period, the islands were administered as the Bonin–Volcano Islands but no resettlement was allowed on Iwo Jima—now a military airbase—and resettlement of the Bonins was limited to Bonin Islanders. The homes of previous Japanese residents were typically destroyed. With the US–Japanese alliance on firmer footing, arrangements made for continued use of Kadena Air Base on Okinawa, and further nuclear weapons development, the Nanpo Islands were fully returned to Japan in 1968.

== Geography ==
The subprefecture consists of the Bonin Islands, the Volcano Islands, and the isolated islets Okinotorishima, Minamitorishima, and Nishinoshima. Together with the Ōshima, Miyake, and Hachijō Subprefectures in the Izu Islands, Ogasawara forms part of Japan's Nanpo Islands.

Only the islands of Chichijima and Hahajima in the Bonin Islands have a permanent civilian population. Chichijima is connected to Tokyo by a day-long ferry that runs several times each month. Hahajima is connected to Chichijima by a separate smaller ferry that operates more regularly. Development of an airport is supported by the central, regional, and local levels of government and some islanders, but concerns about its profitability and potential environmental damage have delayed projects indefinitely.

Iwo Jima in the Volcano Islands supports a Japanese Self-Defense Force base at its Central Field. The SDF also provide emergency airlifts as needed for the two settled islands.

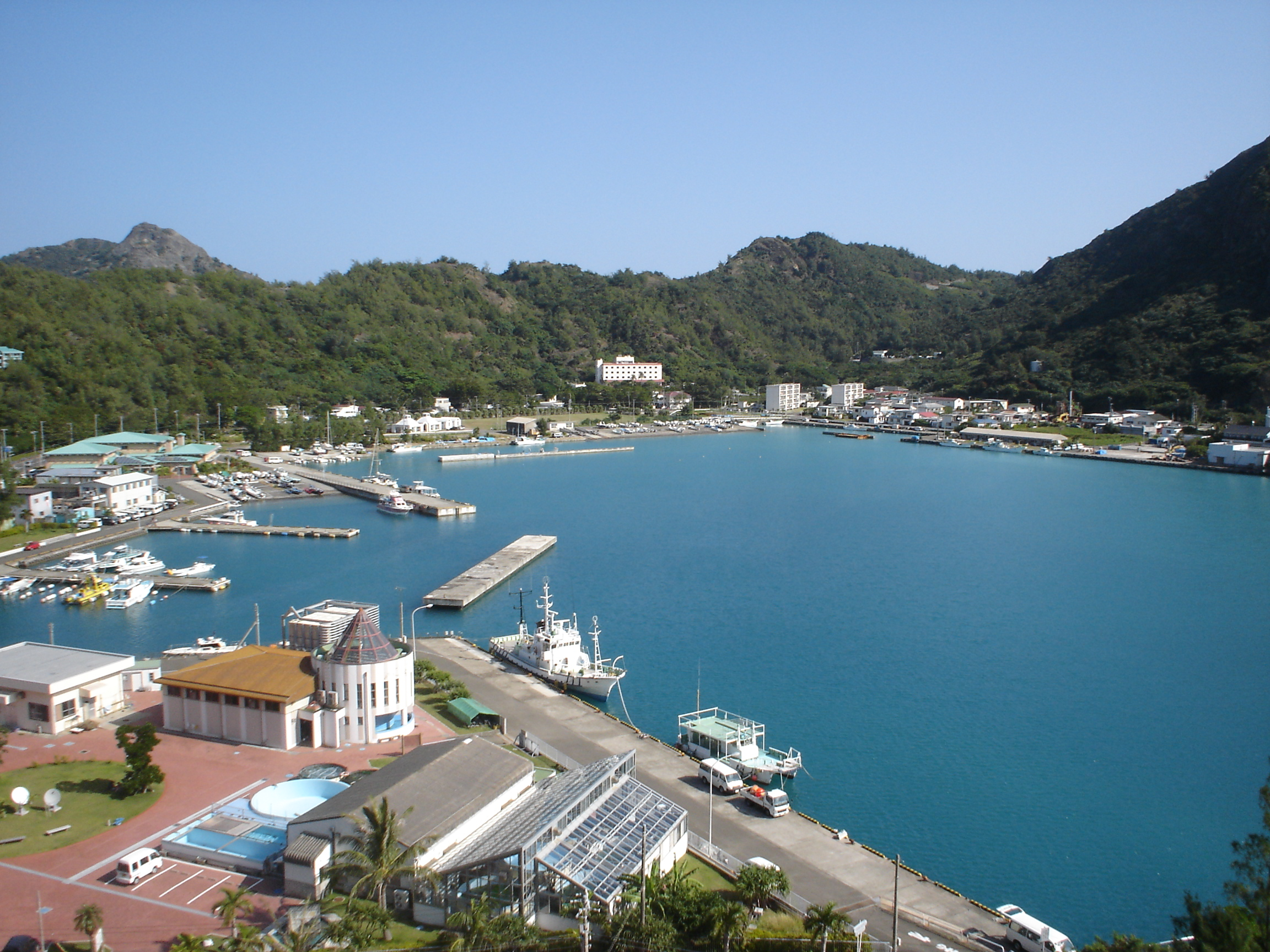
The harbor at Chichijima

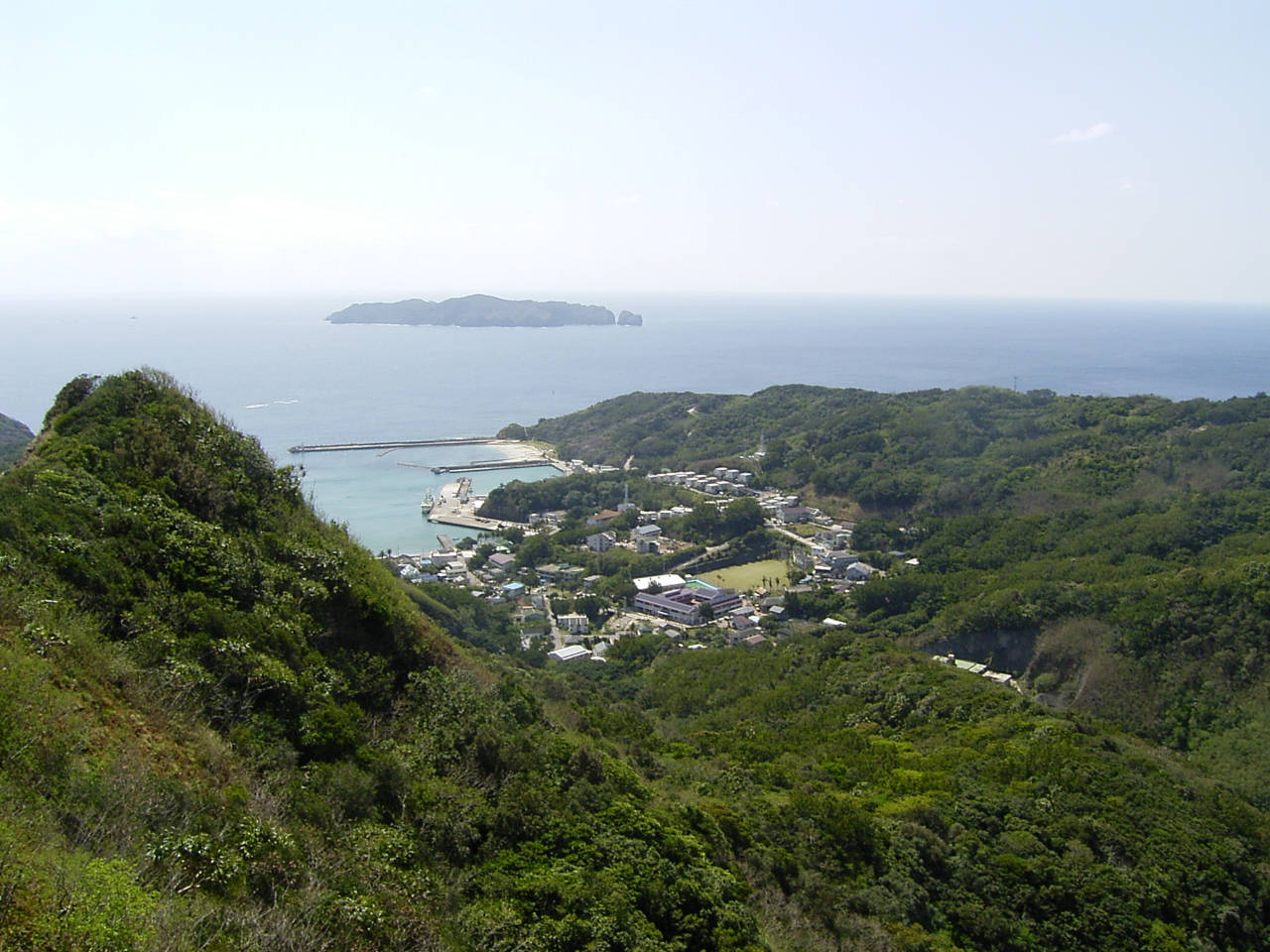
Oki or Okimura on Hahajima

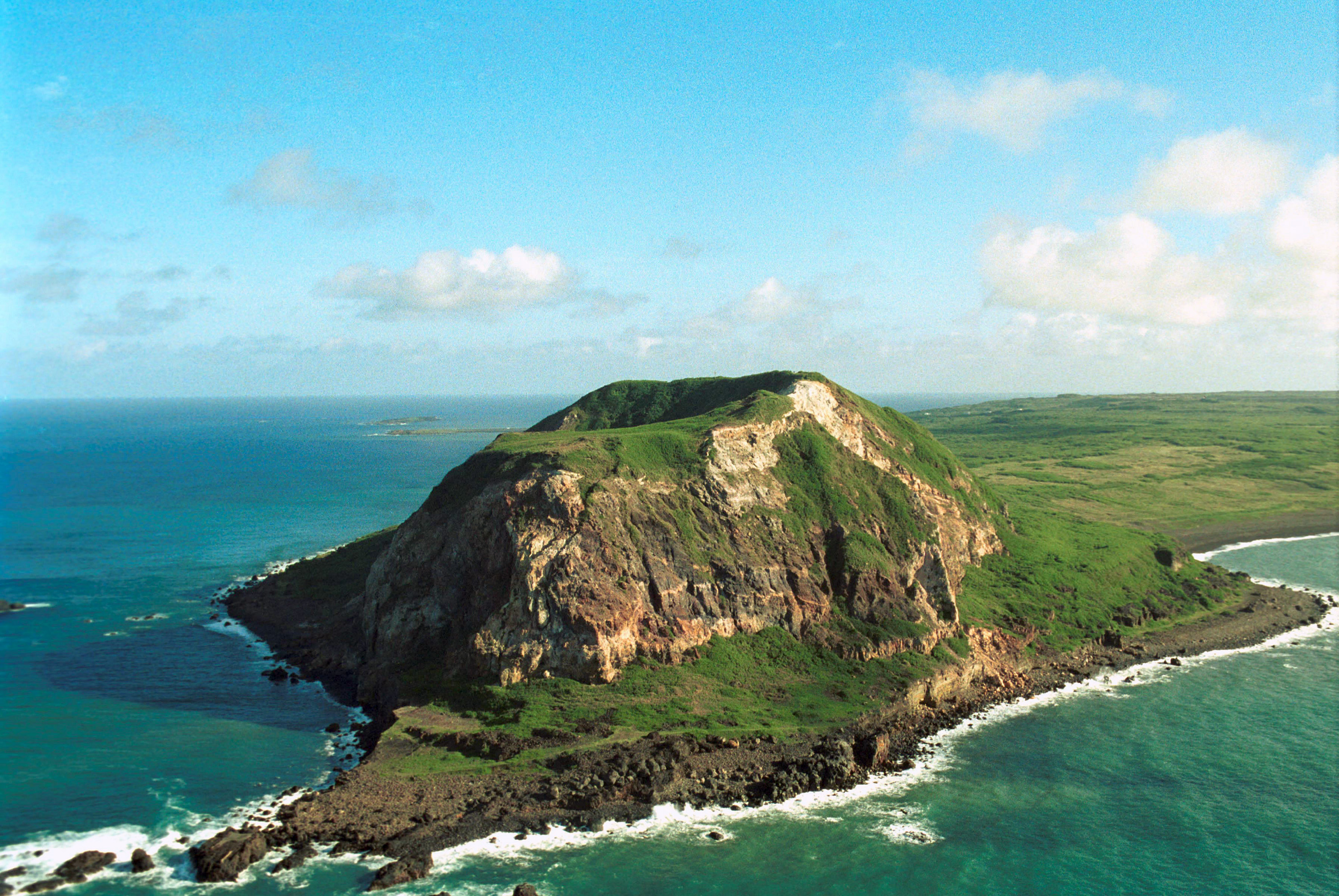
Iwo Jima, now an SDF airbase

== Ecology ==
The islands are part of the distinct and biodiverse Ogasawara subtropical moist forests ecoregion, which developed largely in isolation and with minimal human contact until the 19th century. Following settlement, many areas were entirely deforested for farming but the islands remain home to many endemic species. The ecosystem fragility is well documented and it suggests comparisons with the cautious development history of the Galapagos. Scuba diving and similar ecotourism are now important for the islands' economy.

== Culture ==
Following repatriation, the island schools went from all English to all Japanese education in a single day. Some of the Bonin Islanders accepted American citizenship and moved to the United States, and the return and immigration of people from the Home Islands quickly made Chichijima and Hahajima majority Japanese. The Bonin Islanders now make up about a tenth of the islands' population.

== See also ==
- Subprefectures of Japan
- Ogasawara, Tokyo
