= Nanpō Islands =

Island group in Japan

Coordinates: 28.0000°N 141.0000°E

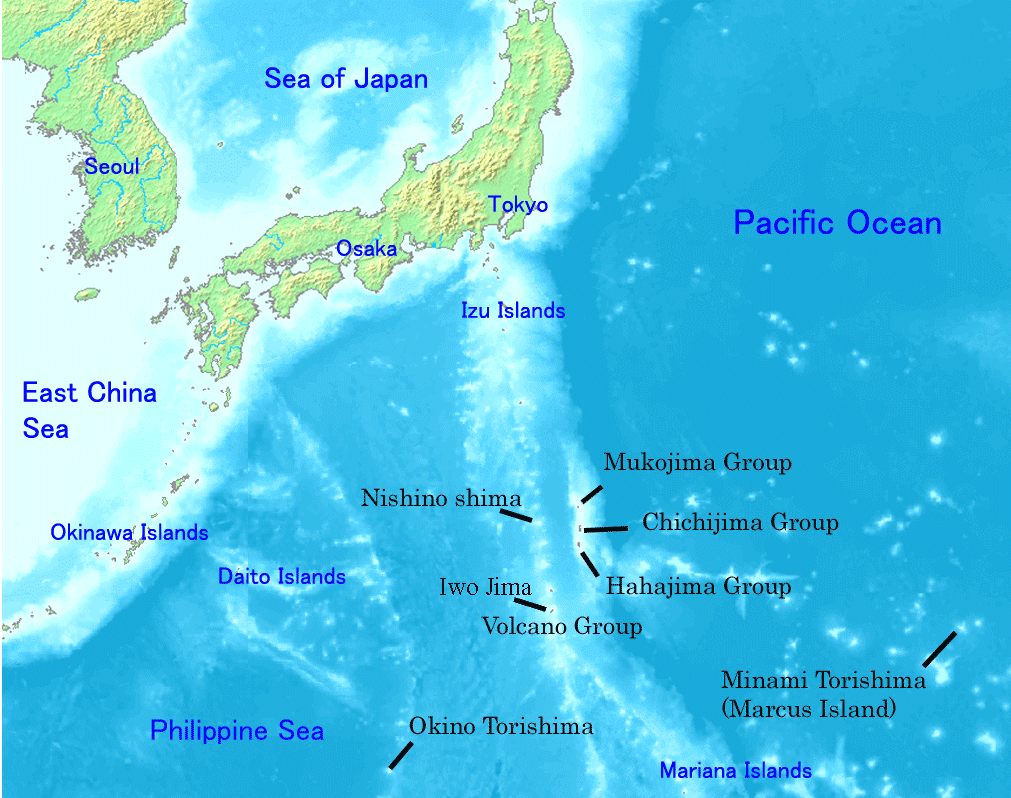
Nanpō Islands

The Nanpō Islands (南方諸島, Nanpō Shotō) is a collective term for the groups of islands that are located to the south of the Japanese archipelago. They extend from the Izu Peninsula west of Tokyo Bay southward for about 1,200 km (750 mi), to within 500 km (310 mi) of the Mariana Islands. The Nanpō Islands are all administered by Tokyo Metropolis.

The Hydrographic and Oceanographic Department of the Japan Coast Guard defines the Nanpō Shotō as follows:

- Nanpō Shotō (Nanpō Islands)
  - Izu Shotō (Izu Islands)
  - Ogasawara Guntō (Bonin Islands)
    - Mukojima Rettō
    - Chichijima Rettō
    - Hahajima Rettō
  - Kazan Rettō (Volcano Islands)
    - Kita Iwo Jima (North Iwo Jima)
    - Iwo Jima
    - Minami Iwo Jima (South Iwo Jima)
    - Nishinoshima
  - Okinotorishima
  - Minamitorishima

The Geospatial Information Authority of Japan, a government agency that is responsible for standardization of place names, does not use the term Nanpō Shotō, although it has agreed with the Japan Coast Guard over the names and extents of the subgroups of the Nanpō Shotō.

Archeological evidence has since revealed that some of the islands were prehistorically inhabited by members of an unknown Micronesian ethnicity. The Japanese claim to have discovered the islands in 1593; however, many of the islands were known by the Spanish sailors that went from Philippines to New Spain since Bernardo de la Torre's voyage in 1543, while the British claimed the islands in 1827. However, neither Japan nor Britain developed the Nanpō Islands, although a small colony of Bonin Islanders was established at Chichi-jima.

Some Japanese began migrating to the islands in 1853, and the Shogunate government attempted to claim the islands in 1861. In 1876, the Meji government of Japan formally incorporated Ogasawara islands into the territory with the consent of the Western powers, placing them under the administration of the Tokyo Prefecture. And in 1891 Japan incorporated the more southerly and then-uninhabited Volcano Islands as part of Ogasawara Subprefecture.

By the mid-1930s the islands were closed to foreigners and a small Imperial Japanese Navy base was established at Chichi-jima. As the war intensified and U.S. forces approached in 1944, most of the civilians living on the islands were forced to evacuate.

After World War II, the islands were administered by the United States under Article III of the Treaty of San Francisco until they were returned to Japan in 1968. In 2011, the Ogasawara Islands were included on UNESCO’s World Heritage list.

== See also ==
- List of governors of the Nanpō Islands
- Ogasawara subtropical moist forests
- Nansei Islands
