= South Iwo Jima =

Southernmost island in the Volcano Islands group

Native name: Japanese: 南硫黄島
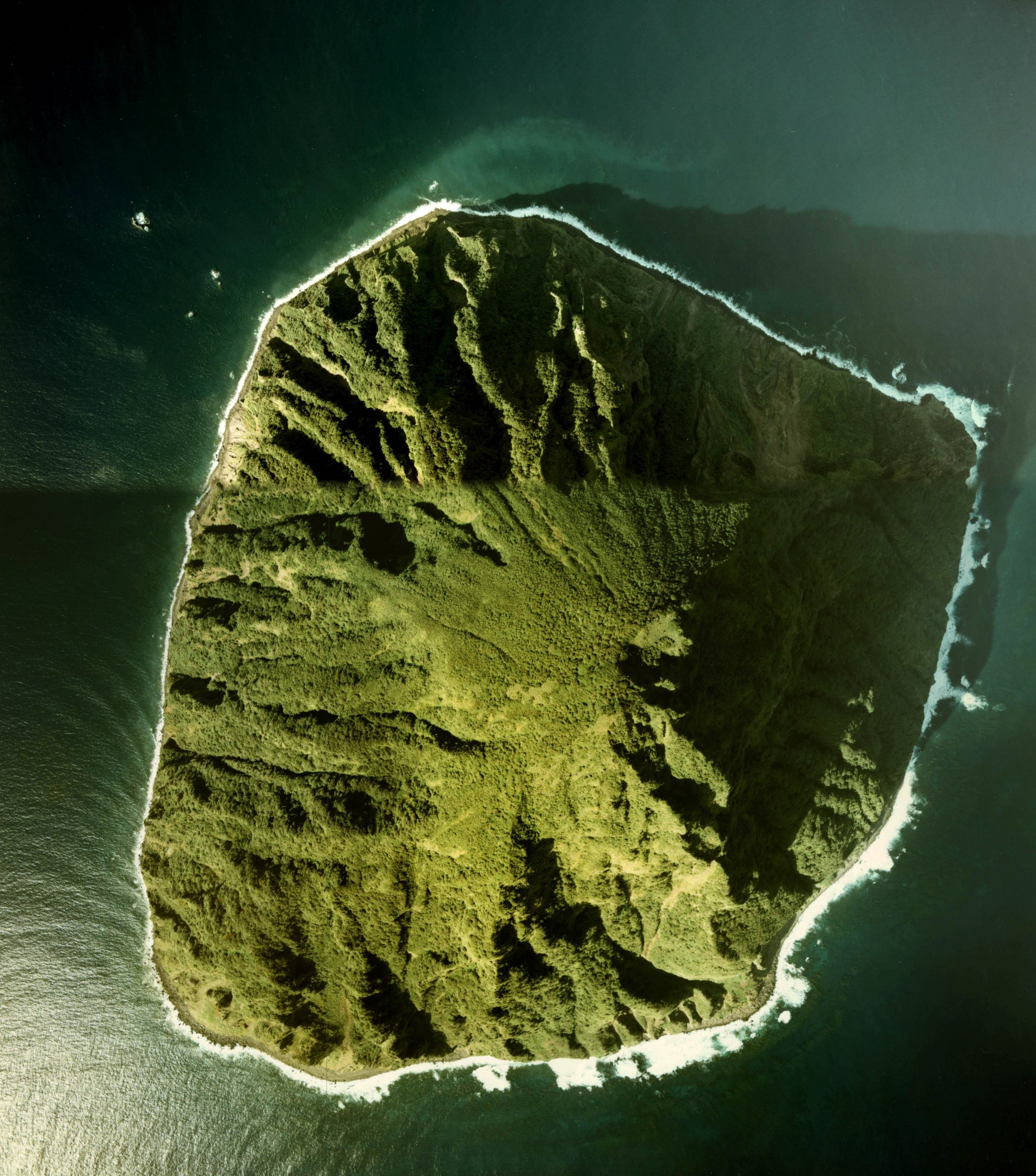
- Minami-Iōtō

- Location within Japan

Geography
- Location: Pacific Ocean
- Coordinates: 24°14′2″N 141°27′49″E
- Archipelago: Volcano Islands
- Area: 3.54 km^{2} (1.37 sq mi)
- Coastline: 7.5 km (4.66 mi)
- Highest elevation: 916 m (3005 ft)

Administration
- Japan
- Prefecture: Tokyo
- Subprefecture: Ogasawara Subprefecture
- Village: Ogasawara

Demographics
- Population: 0
- Pop. density: 0/km^{2} (0/sq mi)

South Iwo Jima (南硫黄島, Minami-Iōtō; "South Sulfur Island"), officially Minami Iōtō or South Iōtō (written with the same characters) since 18 June 2007 and also formerly known as Santo Agustino, is a 3.4 km^{2} (1.3 sq mi) uninhabited island in the North Pacific. Located 60 kilometers (37 mi) south of Iwo Jima, it is the southernmost of the Volcano Islands, part of the Nanpo Archipelago. Farallon de Pajaros is the next island to its south, 541 kilometers (336 mi) away in the Northern Mariana Islands.

Occupied by the United States Armed Forces following World War II, South Iwo Jima was restored to Japanese control in 1968. It is now administered as part of Ogasawara Subprefecture in the Tokyo Metropolitan Government.

== Description ==
The island lies 1,300 kilometers (810 mi) south of Tokyo, 330 kilometers (210 mi) SSW of Chichijima. Its area is 3.4 square kilometers (1.3 sq mi) and the shore length, 7.5 kilometers (4.7 mi). Along the shoreline there are few bays and inlets, and it is covered with mostly rocks and little sand. To the rear are sea cliffs that rise to 200 meters (660 ft) in height. The peak on South Iwo Jima is the largest in Ogasawara Subprefecture—including the Bonin and Volcano Islands and three isolated islets—at 913 meters (2,995 ft) and its average slope angle is 45 degrees. The northwest side of this volcano, which has a relatively stable shape and is not eroding much, rises at a gentler incline of 30 degrees. Another defining feature of the island is that it does not have rivers, lakes, marshes or a freshwater system of any kind, rendering it uninhabitable.

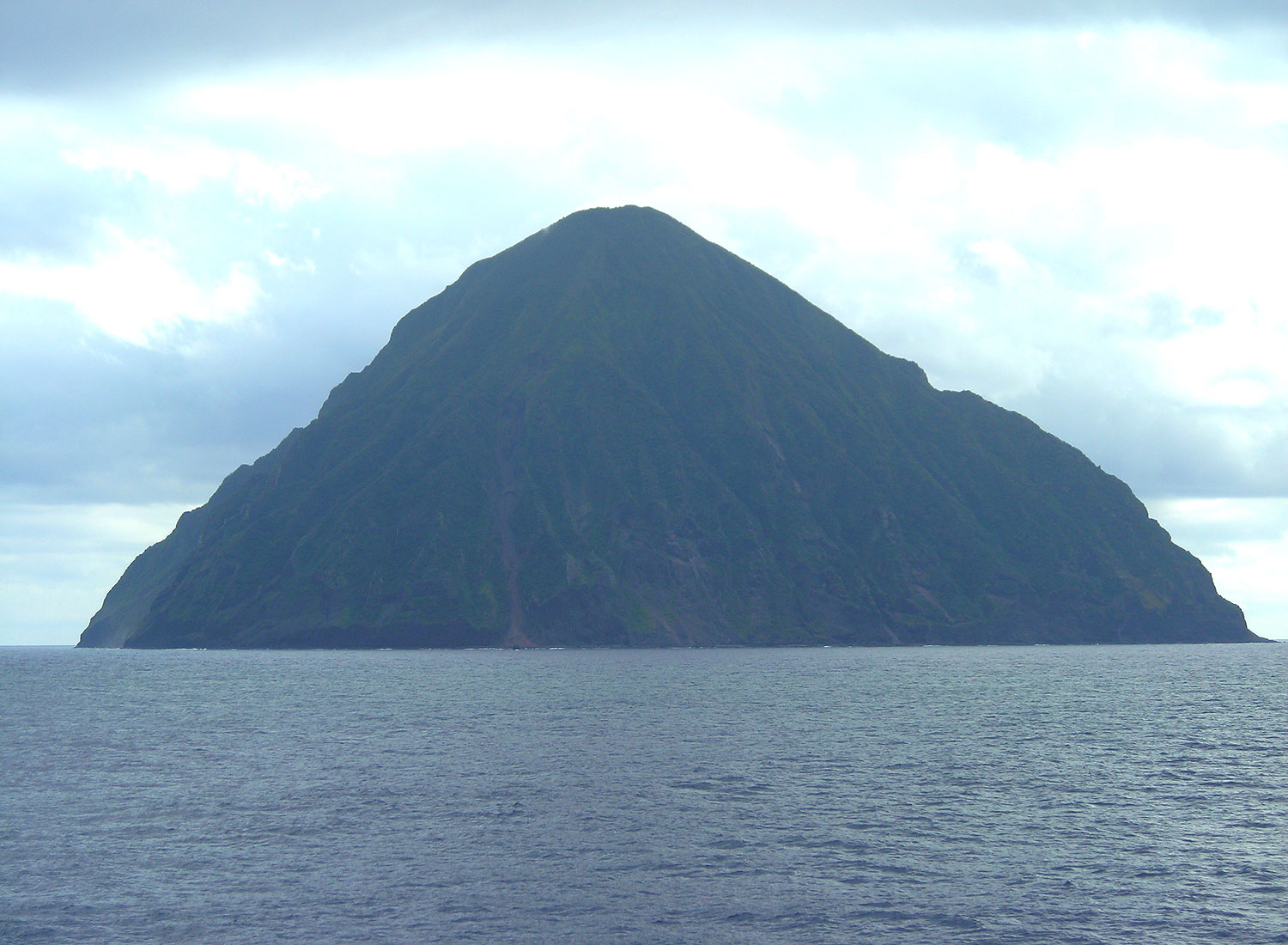

South Iwo Jima is part of a volcanic front which has been active for 2,588,000 years beginning in the Quaternary period and started to form as a result of volcanic activity in that period. Though it is not clear when it emerged as an island, rocks which have been gathered and analyzed show no signs of geomagnetic reversal, so it is believed that the island is no more than a few hundred thousand years old. Although Micronesians may have passed the island in the past, South Iwo Jima is first known to have been discovered in late September or early October 1543 by Spanish explorer Bernardo de la Torre on board the carrack San Juan de Letrán during a failed attempt to find a northern route east from the Philippines to Mexico. It was he who named it "San(to) Agustino"; however, the name did not stick.

== Environment ==
The island is a treasure house of precious animals and plants because it has not been developed historically due to its geographical isolation from mainland Japan, steep topography, and severe weather conditions. The upper part of the island is often covered with clouds and fog, and the ecosystem differs from elevation to elevation. Because of this, the entire area of the island has been designated by the Japanese government as a Nature Conservation Area of Forest Ecosystem in Ogasarawa-Islands and access to the island is strictly restricted, with only a limited number of scientists authorized by the government and mountain experts supporting them being allowed to land on the island. To date, serious academic research has been conducted only four times: in 1936, 1982, 2007, and 2017. Since all the survey routes are from the southwestern coast to the summit of the island, which is relatively easy to climb, most of the island is unexplored except for the coastal area. In 2017, the first drone survey of an unexplored region of the island was conducted. The island forms part of the Volcano Islands (Kazan-retto) Important Bird Area (IBA), designated by BirdLife International.

== In popular culture ==
An episode of the television show The Time Tunnel, called "Kill Two by Two", is set on South Iwo Jima, although in the show it is depicted as a lush tropical island with lots of vegetation and fresh water.

South Iwo Jima is the location of Mahoutokoro, the Japanese school of witchcraft and wizardry in the fictional universe of Harry Potter. Mahoutokoro, a shiro (castle) perched on the peak of the extinct volcano, is constructed of pure nephrite jade and the island is surrounded by stormy seas, without any Muggle inhabitants. Because of a Muggle airbase on a neighbouring island, Quidditch players at the school are forced to be alert of airplanes traveling to and from that base.

== See also ==
- Iwo Jima
- Desert island
- List of islands
- Fukutoku-Okanoba, nearby ephemeral island and submarine volcano
- List of volcanoes in Japan
