= Fukutoku-Okanoba =

Submarine volcano in Bonin Islands, Japan

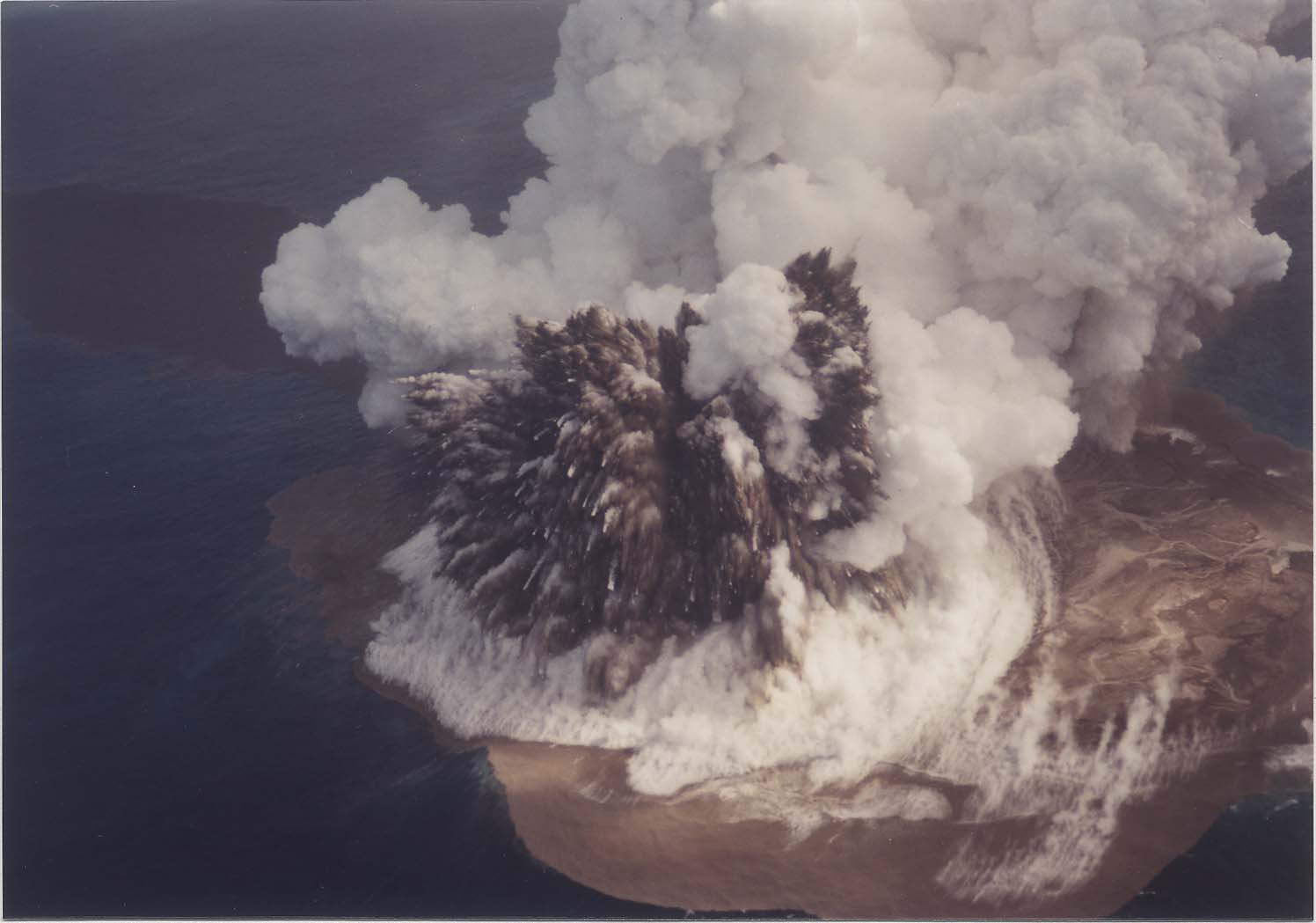
- The eruption smoke rises, and the fountain is emitted from the inside, giving it a coxtail shape on January 20, 1986

Highest point
- Elevation: −29 metres (−95 ft)
- Coordinates: 24°16′48″N 141°29′06″E

Geography
- Location within Japan
- Location: Volcano Islands, Japan

Geology
- Mountain type: Submarine volcano
- Volcanic arc: Izu–Bonin–Mariana Arc
- Last eruption: August 2021

Fukutoku-Okanoba (福徳岡ノ場) is a submarine volcano that is part of the Volcano Islands in the Bonin Islands of Japan. It is located five kilometers (3.1 mi) northeast of the island of South Iwo Jima.

== Geography ==
The volcano is part of a larger elongated submarine volcano with two peaks and with a magma composition of trachyte. The volcano itself has erupted on multiple occasions with the last eruption before 2021 occurring during 2010. The first island to form when this volcano was discovered formed in 1904–5 and with a few more forming during the course of the 1900s. It is part of an alkaline volcanic province of the Izu-Bonin arc.

== History ==
The earliest recorded eruption of Fukutoku-Okanoba in 1904 formed an ephemeral island named Shin-Iwo-jima (New Sulfur Island). Other ephemeral islands have also formed, the most recent of which formed in 1986. In 2010, the Japanese coast guard spotted steam rising one kilometer (0.62 mi) above the ocean and water discoloration of the surrounding area. In 2021, the Japan Meteorological Agency (JMA) reported that a submarine eruption occurred at Fukutoku-Okanoba volcano at 6:20 a.m. local time on August 13. On August 16, it was confirmed that a new island had formed as a result of the latest eruption.

In October 2021, large quantities of pumice pebbles from Fukutoku-Okanoba damaged fisheries, tourism, the environment, 11 ports in Okinawa and 19 ports in Kagoshima prefecture. Clean-up operations took 2–3 weeks.

=== Timeline ===
- 1904-1905 : An island roughly 145 m (476 ft) in height and 4.5 km (2.8 mi) in circumference is formed by an undersea eruption. By June 1905, it shrinks to less than 3 m (9.8 ft) high and eventually collapses into a reef.
- 1914 : An island with a height of 300 m (980 ft) and a circumference of 11.8 km (7.3 mi) is formed by a undersea eruption in January. By the end of the year, it begins to collapse.
- 1916 : The island is collapsed.
- 1986 : An island is formed by a undersea eruption in January, quickly submerging by the end of March.
- 2005 : An undersea eruption on July 2 creates a huge water vapor column with 1,000 m (3,300 ft) high and 50–100 m (160–330 ft) wide.
- 2007 : On December 1, the Japan Meteorological Agency begins announcing eruption warnings for all active volcanoes in Japan, continuing to monitor the Fukutoku-Okanoba area ever since.
- 2008 : Discolored water is observed for several months starting around February.
- 2010 : Due to an undersea eruption on February 3, eruptions and discolored water are observed in the surrounding area.
- 2013 : On September 27, observations by the Japan Maritime Self-Defense Forces confirm a green discoloration of the sea surface and the eruption of white foam on the sea surface within a radius of 450 m (1,480 ft).
- 2020 : On February 4, the Japan Coast Guard observes yellow-green discolored water in the area.
- 2021 : On August 13, smoke from an undersea eruption of the seafloor is observed rising about 17,000 m (56,000 ft) high, in addition to volcanic lightning. Initially, volcanic ash crosses the Bashi Channel and enters the South China Sea. This eruption is considered to be one of the largest in Japan after the Second World War. Observations by the Japan Coast Guard on August 15 confirm a new island roughly 1 km (0.62 mi) in diameter. On August 17, the new island had split into two parts, east and west, and on October 20 it was confirmed that the eastern side had disappeared. In October, a large amount of pumice believed to have come from this eruption is found to have drifted over 1,000 km (620 mi) away to the Daito Islands and Ryukyu Islands.
- 2022 : A flight operated by The Asahi Shimbun newspaper observes that the new island is no longer visible, having been eroded away.

== Gallery ==
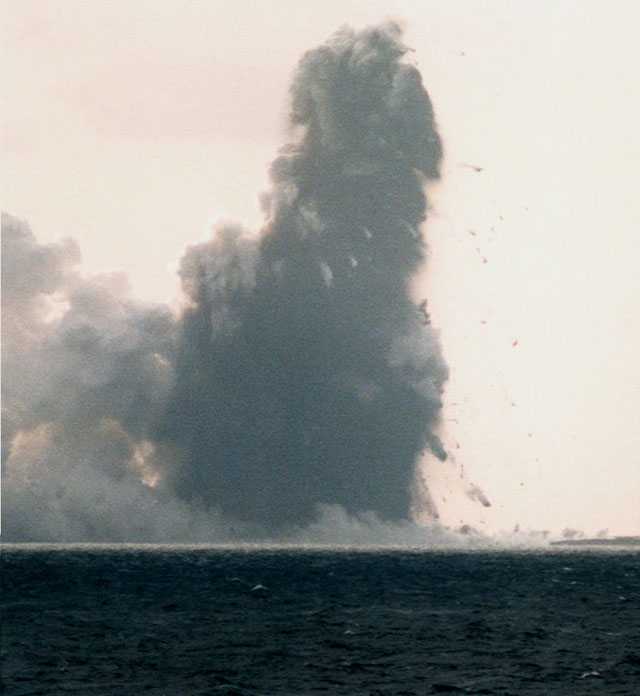
Eruption situation of Fukutoku Okanoba (Jan 20, 1986)

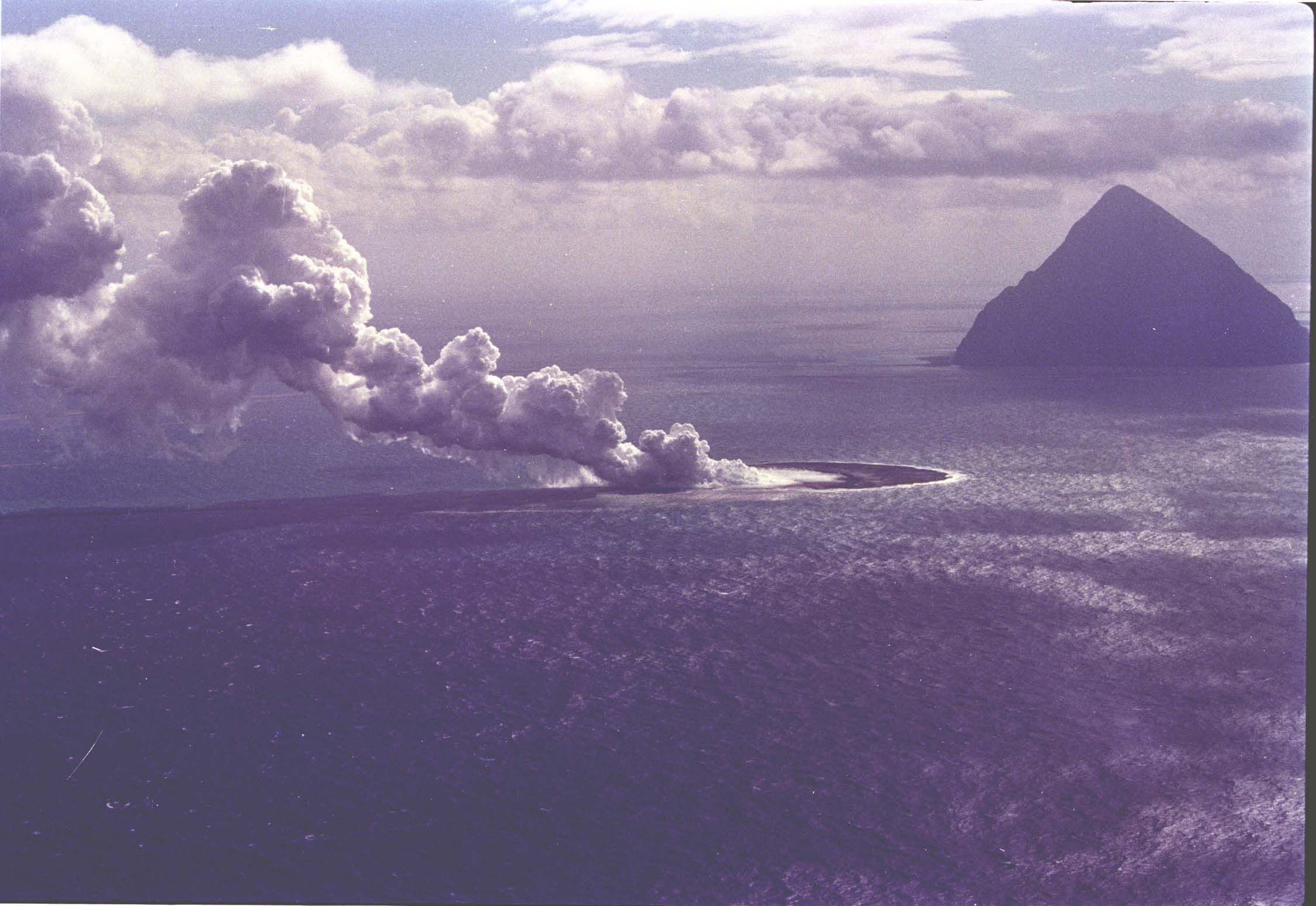
Fukutoku Okanoba and South Iwo Jima during eruption activity (Jan 20, 1986)

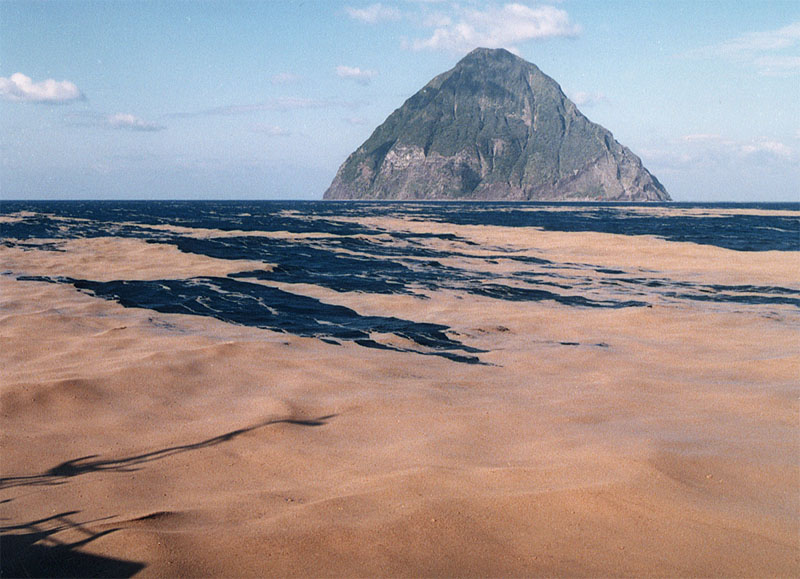
Pumice stones lifted by the eruption fill the surface of the sea. The distant island is South Iwo Jima (Jan 20, 1986)

Himawari-8 satellite images of the August 12 to August 13, 2021 eruption of Fukutoku-Okanoba

== See also ==
- List of volcanoes in Japan
