= USS Iwo Jima =

Three ships of the United States Navy have been named USS Iwo Jima, in memory of the Battle of Iwo Jima.

- USS Iwo Jima (CV-46) was to be an Essex-class aircraft carrier, but construction was canceled in August 1945 and scrapped in 1949.
- USS Iwo Jima (LPH-2) was the lead ship of the Iwo Jima-class amphibious assault ships; she served from 1961 to 1993. Best known as the leader of the task force to recover Apollo 13 astronauts after their return to Earth. Scrapped in 1995.
- USS Iwo Jima (LHD-7) is a Wasp-class amphibious assault ship. She was commissioned into active service in 2001 and is still in service today.
