= Iōjima, Tokyo =

Iōjima 硫黄島村
- Former municipality
- Location in Japan
- Coordinates: 24°47′N 141°19′E
- Country: Japan
- Region: Kantō region
- Prefecture: Tokyo
- District: none
- Merged: June 26, 1968 (now part of Ogasawara, Tokyo)

Area
  - Total: 23.16 km^{2} (8.94 sq mi)

Population (1943)
  - Total: 1,018
- Time zone: UTC+09:00 (JST)

Iōjima (硫黄島村, Iōjima-mura) was a village in the Japanese prefecture of Tokyo. Its administrative area covered the whole island of Iwo Jima (officially Iōtō since 2007), one of the Volcano Islands. It existed from 1923 when the Ogasawara islands were organized into modern municipalities to 1952 when mainland Tokyo returned to Japanese sovereignty and Iwo Jima was put under US military administration. When the island was returned to Japan in 1968 it became part of the village of Ogasawara, Tokyo.

In 1943, the village had a population of 1,018 in 192 households. For a period the population was fewer than 1,200.

Administratively the villages and towns on Tokyo's islands were never subordinate to counties, but through subprefectures more directly tied to the prefectural administration (Home Ministry appointed county governments in mainland Japan were abolished in 1921 by the Hara cabinet to strengthen the local autonomy of municipalities). In addition, municipal administrations on small islands followed different administrative rules than those on the main islands, the tōsho chō-son-sei (島嶼町村制). In 1940, Tokyo's island municipalities including Iōjima were transformed into ordinary towns and villages and followed the same revised Imperial administrative code of 1911 (chō-son-sei) as the towns and villages on the mainland.
