= Americans in Japan =

Ethnic group in Japan

Total population
- 69,787 (as of December 2025, excluding those affiliated with the American Armed Forces)

Regions with significant populations
- Tokyo, Osaka, Kanagawa, Okinawa, Chiba, Hyogo, Aichi

Languages
- English • Japanese

Americans in Japan (在日アメリカ人/在日米国人, Zainichi Amerikajin/Zainichi Beikokujin) are citizens of the United States residing in Japan. As of December 2025, there were 69,787 American citizens registered as foreign residents of Japan, forming 1.69% of the total population of registered aliens, according to statistics from Japan's Ministry of Justice. This made Americans the eleventh-largest group of foreign residents in Japan, having been surpassed in number by Vietnamese residents, Nepalese residents, Indonesian residents, Burmese residents, Sri Lankan residents, and Taiwanese residents since 2011.

In addition to registered foreign residents, a significant number of American military personnel, civilian workers, and their dependents live in Japan due to the presence of the United States military in Japan under the U.S.–Japan Security Treaty. Approximately 70% of these American military personnel are stationed in Okinawa Prefecture. According to the Ministry of Foreign Affairs, as of March 31, 2013, there were 105,677 American citizens residing in Japan under one of these statuses. Since 2014, neither the Japanese government nor the American military has published updated figures.

== History ==
The first Americans came to Japan in 1791 aboard two merchant vessels from Massachusetts which landed at Kushimoto, Wakayama, south of Osaka. Because of the isolationist sakoku policy of the Tokugawa shogunate, the vessels landed under the pretense that they were taking refuge from a storm. They began negotiations with Japanese authorities about the possibility of opening trade relations, but made no headway, and departed after eleven days. One early American resident of Japan was Ranald MacDonald, who arrived in Japan in 1848 and was the first native speaker to teach the English language in Japan. In 1830, Nathaniel Savory was among the first settlers to colonize the remote Bonin Islands, an archipelago which was later incorporated by Japan.

Larger numbers of Americans began to enter Japan after the 1854 Convention of Kanagawa, under which Commodore Matthew C. Perry pressured Japan to open to international trade. Many Americans served as foreign government advisors in Japan during the Meiji period (1868–1912).

Prior to World War II, it was a common practice for first-generation issei Japanese immigrants in the United States to send their nisei children, who were American citizens, to Japan for education. Known as kibei (帰米; lit. "returnees to America"), they often found themselves the subject of discrimination from their classmates in Japan during their studies; upon their return to the United States, they often faced criticism for being "too Japanese" due to perceived authoritarianism, militarism, or pro-Japanese sympathies.

Following Japan's surrender in World War II, hundreds of thousands of American military personnel were stationed in Japan during its occupation. American general Douglas MacArthur held the position of Supreme Commander for the Allied Powers during the majority of the occupation. After the occupation ended, a large number of American military bases remained in Japan under the Treaty of Mutual Cooperation and Security between the United States and Japan, and the United States continued to control the Ryukyu Islands until the reversion of Okinawa to Japan in 1972.

The postwar period also saw an increase in cultural interaction between the United States in Japan. Americans in Japan were active in sports, such as baseball, professional wrestling, and sumo. Meanwhile, academics and scholars who spent significant time in Japan, including Edwin O. Reischauer, Donald Keene, Edward Seidensticker, John Whitney Hall, and Donald Richie, became influential cultural critics and contributed to the development of the field of Japanese studies in the 1950s and 1960s.

Since 1987 the Japanese government has administered the JET Programme, an initiative that employs thousands of overseas college graduates as Assistant Language Teachers in Japanese public schools, usually for a period of one to three years. Approximately half of these teachers are from the United States.

== Notable people ==
This is a list of American citizens whose notability is related to their past or current residence in Japan.

- Ai, singer and record producer
- Akebono Tarō, first foreign-born sumo wrestler to reach the rank of yokozuna
- Michael Arias, first foreign director of a major anime film
- Atsugiri Jason, comedian and television personality
- Randy Bass, NPB baseball player and triple crown winner
- Billy Blanks, fitness guru and martial artist
- Thane Camus, television personality
- Walter Tenney Carleton, founding director of NEC
- Dante Carver, actor
- William S. Clark, agricultural advisor in Hokkaido
- William Copeland, founder of one of the first beer breweries in Japan
- Henry Willard Denison, diplomat and lawyer during the Meiji era
- Kent Derricott, television personality
- Leah Dizon, singer and model
- Norman England, writer, actor, filmmaker
- Ernest Fenollosa, art historian during the Meiji era
- Charlotte Kate Fox, lead actress in the television series Massan
- Toby Fox, creator of the video games Undertale and Deltarune
- Marty Friedman, guitarist from Megadeth, later television contributor
- Patrick Harlan, comedian and television personality
- James Curtis Hepburn, creator of Hepburn romanization
- Jero, enka singer
- Jun Hasegawa, model
- Carolyn Kawasaki, model and television personality
- Crystal Kay, singer and actress
- Konishiki Yasokichi, first foreign-born sumo wrestler to reach ōzeki rank
- Tony László, journalist and activist, basis of a character in My Darling Is a Foreigner
- Benjamin Smith Lyman, mining engineer during the Meiji era
- Luther Whiting Mason, pioneer of music education in Japan
- Edward S. Morse, known as "the father of Japanese archaeology"
- Jim O'Rourke, musician and former member of Sonic Youth
- Tuffy Rhodes, NPB all-time home run leader among foreign-born baseball players
- Bob Sapp, fighter and television personality
- Shelly, model and television presenter
- Dave Spector, television commentator
- Takamiyama Daigorō, first foreign-born sumo wrestler to win the top division championship
- Hikaru Utada, singer
- Bobby Valentine, baseball manager for the Chiba Lotte Marines
- James R. Wasson, first non-Japanese person to receive the Order of the Rising Sun

== See also ==
- Japan–United States relations
- Japanese Americans
- Embassy of the United States, Tokyo
- Bonin Islanders
