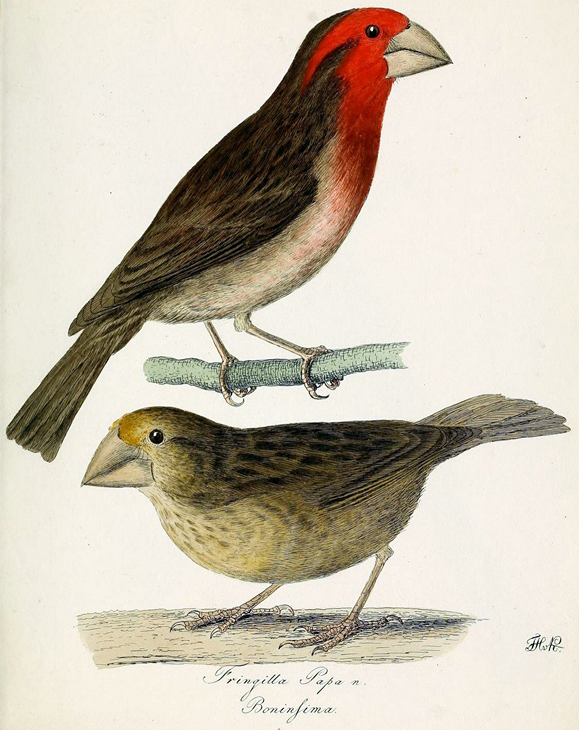
- Bonin grosbeaks by F.H. von Kittlitz, 1828

Conservation status
- Extinct (1830s) (IUCN 3.1)

Scientific classification
- Kingdom: Animalia
- Phylum: Chordata
- Class: Aves
- Order: Passeriformes
- Family: Fringillidae
- Subfamily: Carduelinae
- Genus: Carpodacus
- Species: †C. ferreorostris

Binomial name
- †Carpodacus ferreorostris (Vigors, 1829)

Synonyms
- Coccothraustes ferreorostris Vigors, 1829; Fringilla papa Kittlitz, 1830; Papa ferreirostris Bonaparte; Mycerobas papa Cabanis; Chaunoproctus papa Bonaparte, 1850; Chaunoproctus ferreirostris (lapsus)

= Bonin grosbeak =

Extinct species of bird

The Bonin grosbeak or Bonin Islands grosbeak (Carpodacus ferreorostris) is an extinct finch. It is one of the diverse bird taxa that are vernacularly called "grosbeaks", but it is not closely related to the grosbeaks sensu stricto. Many authorities place the species in the genus Carpodacus, but some place it in its own genus, Chaunoproctus. A 2013 genetic analysis found it to be a relatively basal member of the group, more derived than the common rosefinch, but with no close relatives, with an estimated divergence time from other members of the group around 12.5 million years ago.

== Behaviour ==
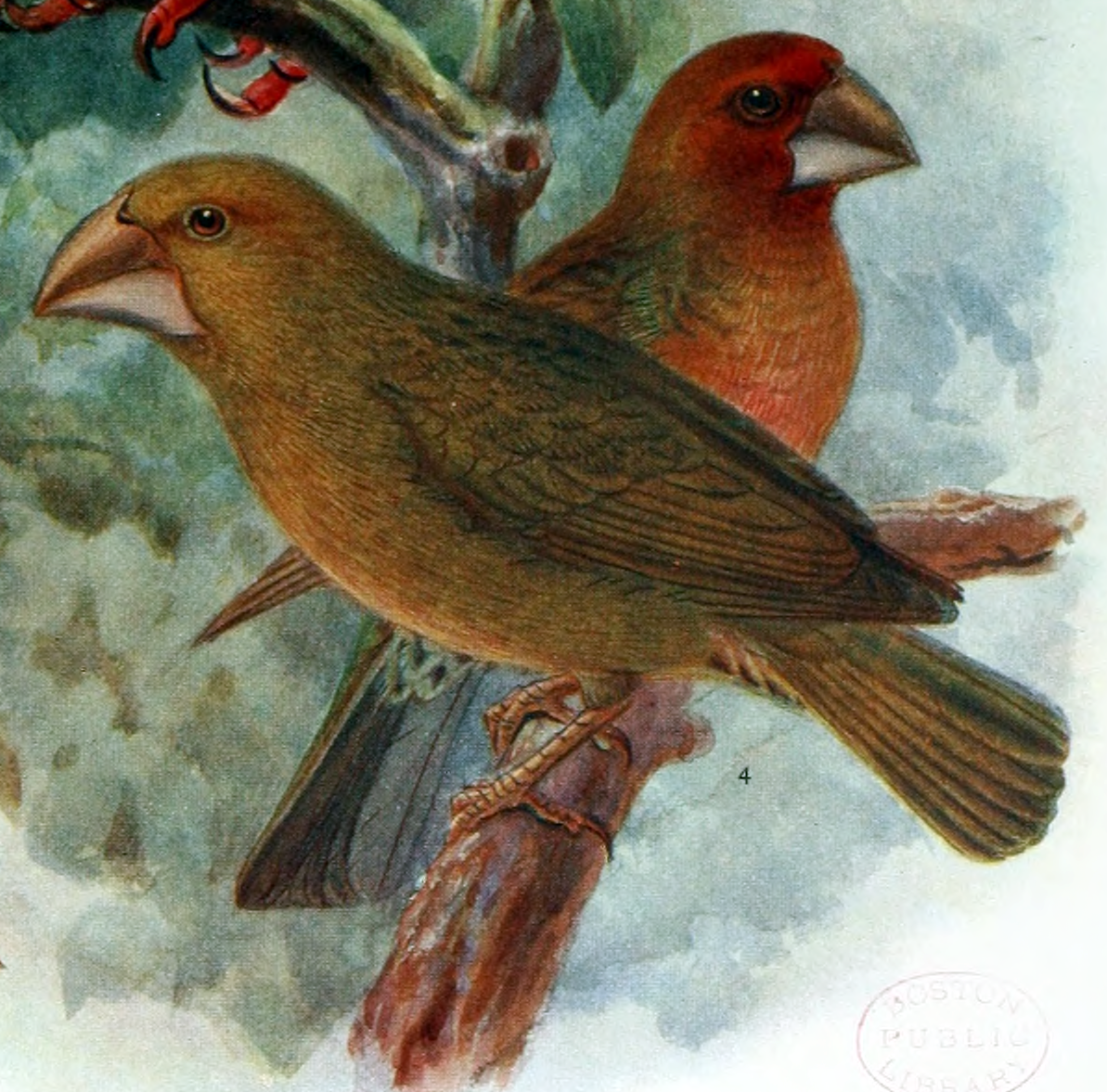
Restoration by Keulemans

It was a retiring although not shy bird, and was usually found singly or in pairs. It fed on fruits and buds which were primarily picked up from the ground or low shrubs; it rarely was observed to perch in trees, being apparently rather phlegmatic and somewhat reluctant to fly. Only one kind of vocalization has been described: a soft, pure and high note, sometimes short, sometimes drawn out; sometimes given singly, sometimes in a short series.

== Habitat ==
It was found only on Chichi-jima in the Ogasawara Islands. While reports that it was also found on islands of the Haha-jima group (母島列島, known as "Baily Islands" to early Western explorers) are almost certainly erroneous, it might have occurred on Anijima and Otōtojima of the Chichi-jima group (父島列島, formerly "Beechey Islands"). Chichi-jima proper is the only place, however, where the bird was observed. Several specimens were taken; some 10 remain at present. Contemporary illustrations show considerable differences, especially in males. Whether these are due to seasonal variation or whether several subspecies or even species existed could only be determined by a thorough review of the available material.

== Extinction ==
Turnaround video of a male specimen, Naturalis Biodiversity Center

The Bonin grosbeak was discovered by the Beechey Pacific expedition, which collected two specimens on Chichi-jima in 1827. The following year, Kittlitz took several more specimens, but he only gave the locality "Boninsima" (="Bonin-shima": Ogasawara Islands). Following the report of two shipwrecked sailors, picked up by Beechey, that the island would make a good stopover station for whalers, settlement was begun in 1830.

When the Rodgers-Ringgold North Pacific Exploring and Surveying Expedition called at Chichi-jima in 1854, naturalist William Stimpson could not find the birds. What he did find, however, were rats and feral goats, sheep, dogs and cats, in addition to the pigs that were already present in 1828 (and which might have been left there by Beechey to provision future castaways). Just like the Bonin thrush, the Bonin grosbeak probably succumbed soon after 1830 to habitat destruction and predation by the introduced mammals.

The collector A.P.Holst in 1889 was told by locals that the species persisted on islands of the Haha-jima group (though Holst could not find any on Haha-jima itself, nor on Chichi-jima for the matter). However, given that the species was not reported from there neither during the 1853 visit of the first Perry mission to Japan nor in 1854, this seems either erroneous or a misunderstanding for some island in the Chichi-jima group. The sedentary habits of the Bonin grosbeak make it unlikely that it was present anywhere outside the Chichijima Rettō.
