= Imōtojima =

Uninhabited island in Japan

Native name: 妹島 (Japanese)
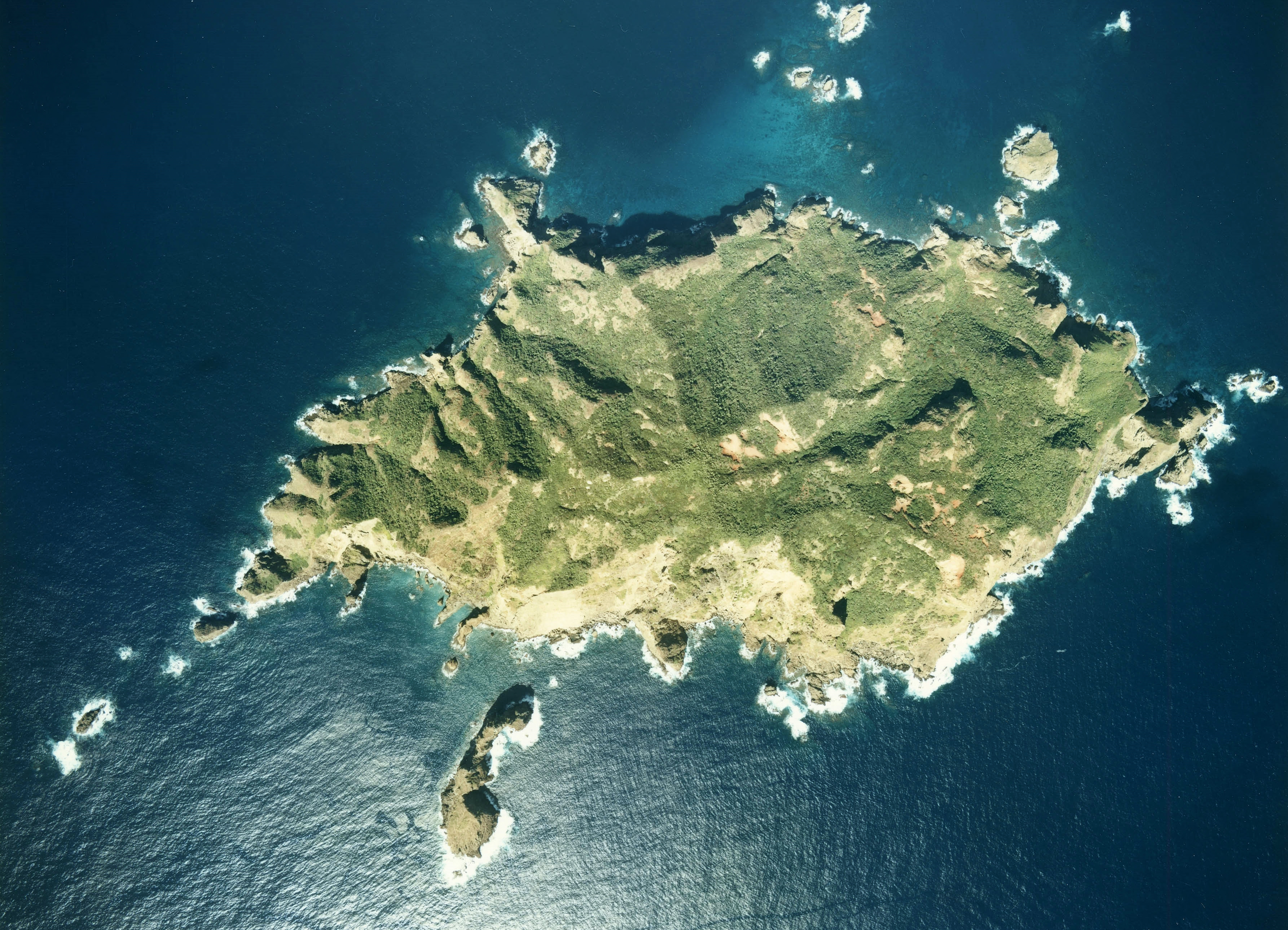
- Satellite picture of Imōtojima

- Location within Japan

Geography
- Location: Pacific Ocean
- Coordinates: 26°33′30″N 142°12′30″E
- Archipelago: Ogasawara Islands
- Area: 1.22 km^{2} (0.47 sq mi)
- Coastline: 6.755 km (4.1974 mi)
- Highest elevation: 216 m (709 ft)

Administration
- Japan
- Prefecture: Tokyo
- Subprefecture: Ogasawara
- Village: Ogasawara

Demographics
- Population: 0 (2025)

Imōtojima, Imōto-jima, or Imōto Jima (妹島; meaning 'Younger Sister Island', or 小島, meaning 'Small Island') is an uninhabited island in the Hahajima archipelago of Japan's Ogasawara Islands (Bonin Islands). The island was first settled during the Meiji period, and in 1963 it had a population of 33. Gradually, however, residents began moving to the larger Hahajima and the island became deserted. The island was first named Imōtojima in 1675 by Shimaya Ichizaemon, who was leading an expedition for the Tokugawa Shogunate to map the then uninhabited islands. Imōtojima is one of only three islands where the endemic Bonin white-eye can be found.
