= American Japanese =

American Japanese may refer to:

- Americans in Japan, residents of Japan from the US
- Dekasegi, migrant workers in Japan originating from various countries of the Americas
- Japanese Americans, US citizens of Japanese descent
- Japanese language education in the United States, education of Japanese American children, non-Japanese or native speakers of Japanese
- Japan–United States relations, the relations between the US and Japan

== See also ==
- Afro-Asians, people of mixed black and Asian descent
- Amerasian, a person born in Asia to an Asian mother and a U.S. military father
- Demographics of North America, diverse language, economy and ethnicity in North America
- Hapa, a person of mixed ethnic heritage
- Japanese people, an ethnic group native to Japan
- es:Café El Japonés, for discussion of early Japanese migration to Argentina
