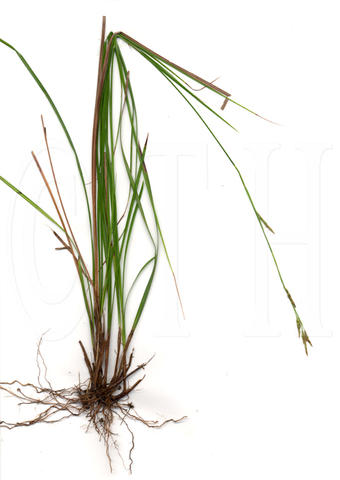

Scientific classification
- Kingdom: Plantae
- Clade: Tracheophytes
- Clade: Angiosperms
- Clade: Monocots
- Clade: Commelinids
- Order: Poales
- Family: Cyperaceae
- Genus: Carex
- Species: C. chichijimensis

Binomial name
- Carex chichijimensis Katsuy.

= Carex chichijimensis =

Species of grass-like plant

Carex chichijimensis is a species of perennial sedge of the genus Carex endemic to Chichijima Island in Japan. C. chichijimensis Katsuy belongs to sect. Graciles Tuck. ex Kük. and is a close relative of C. hattoriana Nakai which is endemic to the Ogasawara Islands. It differs from C. hattoriana in that it has larger, rather glabrous and strongly veined perigynia.
