= Bonin Islanders =

Ethnic group in the Bonin Islands, Japan

欧米系島民
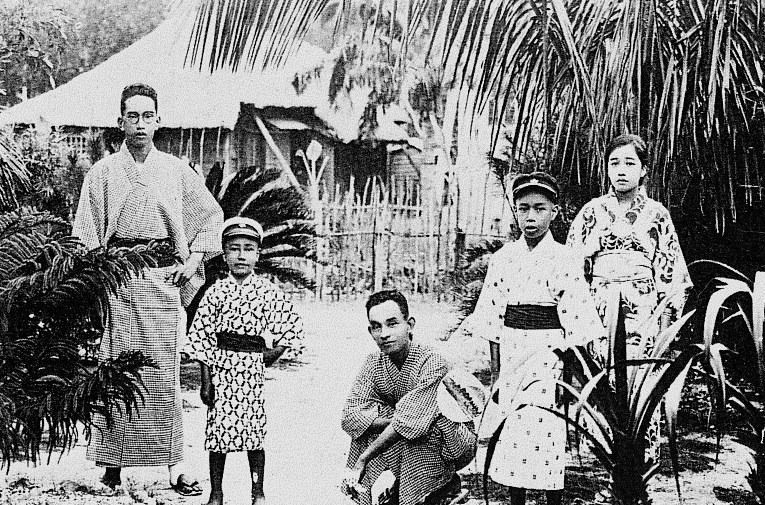
- The Gonsales family, one of the earliest families on the Bonin Islands, sometime in the first half of the 20th century

Regions with significant populations
- Japan (Bonin Islands): 200
- United States: unknown

Languages
- Bonin English, Japanese, American English

Religion
- Irreligious, Christianity, Buddhism, Shinto

Related ethnic groups
- Austronesians, White Americans, Europeans, Native Hawaiians

The Bonin Islanders, also known as the Ogasawara Islanders or Ōbeikei tōmin (欧米系島民; lit. 'European–American Islanders') in Japanese, are a Euronesian ethnic group native to the Bonin Islands (or Ogasawara Islands). They are culturally and genetically distinct from other Japanese ethnic groups such as the Yamato, Ainu, and Ryukyuans as they are the modern-day descendants of a multitude of racial and ethnic groups including the Europeans, White Americans, Polynesians, and Kanaks who settled Hahajima and Chichijima in the 19th century.

== History ==
The first documented instance of human occupation of the Bonin Islands took place in 1830, when Matteo Mazarro, a British citizen from the city of Genoa (now in Italy), who would serve as governor, settled the island of Chichijima. He was accompanied by Nathaniel Savory, a White American from Massachusetts, Albin B. Chapin, also from Massachusetts, Richard J. Millinchamp, an Englishman, Charles Johnson (or Johansen), a Dane, Harry Bolla Otaheite, a Tahitian, John "Judge" Marquese, from Nuku Hiva, and approximately 20 Native Hawaiians, whose personal names were not recorded. Though Savory was American, his expedition had been commissioned by British forces, making it a British settlement.

In the following years more Westerners settled in the islands, including: Thomas H. Webb, an Englishman from Surrey; Louis Leseur, from Brittany, France; two men from Bremen (later part of Germany) with anglicized names, Frederick Rose (or Rohlfs) and William Allen; Joaquim "John Bravo" Gonsales (or Gonçalves) later spelled Gonzalez, from Brava, Cape Verde (then a Portuguese colony), who was described as a "mulatto"; George Augustine Washington, who had Malagasy origins; John Ackerman, who was from Tahiti, and others, possibly British or US citizens, named William Gilley, Joseph Cullins, George Robinson and Benjamin Pease.

== Surnames ==
- Savory (セボレー, Seborē) → Sebori (瀬堀)
- Ackerman (アッカーマン, Akkāman) → Akaman (赤満)
- Washington (ワシントン, Washinton) → Ōhira, Kimura, Ikeda, Matsuzawa (大平・木村・池田・松澤)
- Gilley (ギリー, Girī) → Minami, Nozawa (南・野澤)
- Gonsales (ゴンザレス, Gonzaresu) → Kishi, Ogasawara (岸・小笠原)
- Webb (ウェッブ, Uebbu) → Uwabe / Uebu (上部)

== See also ==
- Americans in Japan
- Indigenous peoples of Asia
- Japanese Americans
