= Jonathan Sherr =

American actor (born 1974)

- Born: April 24, 1974 (age 50)
- Occupation(s): Actor, producer
- Website: jonathansherr.com

Jonathan Sherr (born April 24, 1974) is an American actor known for his portrayal of Tony László in My Darling Is a Foreigner. He played the role of Mardock in Tokyo Bandwagon.

== Filmography ==
=== Live action ===
- English Teacher – Tom
- Love in Tokyo – Tom
- My Darling Is a Foreigner – Tony László
- Tokyo Bandwagon – Murdock
- "Prime Japan"- Amazon

=== Video games ===
- Ace Combat: Joint Assault
- Diabolical Pitch – Referee, Catcher
- Elite Beat Agents
- NightCry – Jerome
