= Saori Oguri =

Japanese manga artist (born 1966)

Saori Oguri 小栗左多里
- Born: December 10, 1966 (age 59) Seki, Gifu Prefecture, Japan
- Area: Manga artist
- Notable works: Is He Turning Japanese?

Saori Oguri (小栗 左多里, Oguri Saori; born December 10, 1966) is a Japanese manga artist born in Gifu Prefecture, Japan. She is a graduate of Tama Art University, where she studied graphic design. Her first work was Sora ni makka na mono relu in the shōjo comic magazine, Chorus (published in 1995 by Shueisha).

Oguri is known for the comic essay series Dārin wa Gaikokujin (literally "My Darling is a Foreigner"), known in English as Is He Turning Japanese?, which portrays her life with her husband, Tony László, with whom she also co-authored Dārin no atamannaka (Inside darling's mind), a comic essay about English and linguistics. The comics were turned into the comedy film My Darling is a Foreigner, released in April 2010.

== List of works ==
- Onegai kami-sama (1998, Shueisha)
- Kono ai no hate ni (2000, Shueisha)
  - Vol. 1 (2001, Shueisha)
  - Vol. 2 (2001, Shueisha)
- Darling wa Gaikokujin series
  - Darling wa Gaikokujin (2002, Media Factory)
  - Darling wa Gaikokujin 2 (2004, Media Factory)
  - Darling no Atamannaka (co-authored with Tony László, 2005, Media Factory)
- Eigo ga dekinai watashi o semenaide! ― I want to speak English! (2004, Yamato Shobō) (Paperback published in 2006)
- Konna watashi mo shugyō shitai! seishin michi nyūmon (2004, Kentōsha)
- Kanayako (2004, Media Factory)
- Tony ryū shiawase o saibai suru hōhō (illustrations only) (2005, Softbank Creative Corporation)
- Saori & Tony Bōken kikō Hawaii de dai no ji (2005, Sony Magazines)
- "'Mezu-mezu Wa Bunka Kenkyusho Kyoto" (co-authored with Tony László, 2008, Jouhou Senta-)
