= Otōtojima =

Uninhabited island in Japan

Native name: Japanese: 弟島
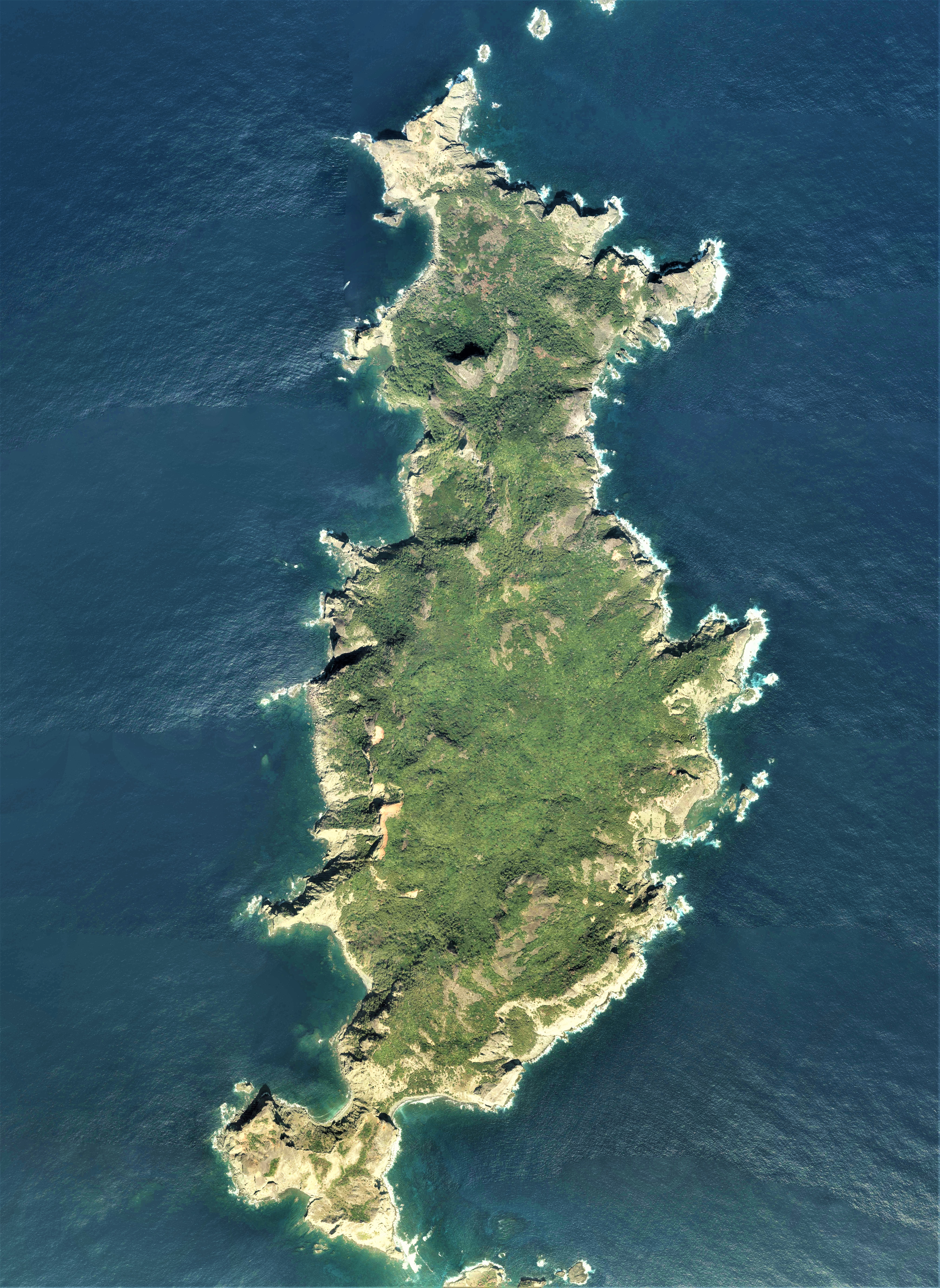
- Satellite picture of the Otōtojima

- Location within Japan

Geography
- Location: Pacific Ocean
- Coordinates: 27°10′N 142°11′E
- Archipelago: Ogasawara Islands
- Area: 5.2 km^{2} (2.0 sq mi)
- Highest elevation: 235 m (771 ft)
- Highest point: Mount Tenkaidake

Administration
- Japan
- Prefecture: Tokyo
- Subprefecture: Ogasawara
- Village: Ogasawara

Demographics
- Population: 0 (2025)

Otōtojima, Otōto-jima, or Otōto Jima (弟島, meaning Younger Brother Island), is an uninhabited island in the Chichijima archipelago of Japan's Ogasawara Islands. During the Meiji and Taishō eras between 50 and 100 people lived on the island, but it was deserted in 1944. The island is off-limits for tourists.

== History ==
The island was first named Otōtojima in 1675 by Shimaya Ichizaemon who was leading an expedition for the Tokugawa Shogunate to map the at the time uninhabited Chichijima islands. In 1850 the island was given the name "Stapleton Island" by a party sent by United States Navy Officer Matthew C. Perry. The first people settled on the island in 1887. These islanders raised sheep and pigs which grazed on cleared portions of the island. At some point before 1915, a school, Omura Elementary School, was built, and it can still be found on the island. The main settlement on the island was called Ichinotani (一ノ谷) and also had a post office. The island was evacuated in 1944 due to World War II and has remained uninhabited since then.

== Conservation ==
Otōtojima is home to many important species that are endemic to the Ogasawara Islands as well as important seabird colonies. All five species of dragonflies endemic to the islands can be found on Otōtojima, and artificial ponds have been built on the island to create more ideal habitat for them. Many invasive species were introduced to the island during settlement such as feral goats, feral pigs, feral cats, bullfrogs, and black rats, and many efforts have been made to eradicate them by the Japanese Ministry of the Environment and other organizations. Bullfrogs were successfully eradicated in 2008, and all the feral cats had been successfully captured by 2010. The extermination of the feral pigs and goats were also successful and extermination efforts for the rats on the island are ongoing.
