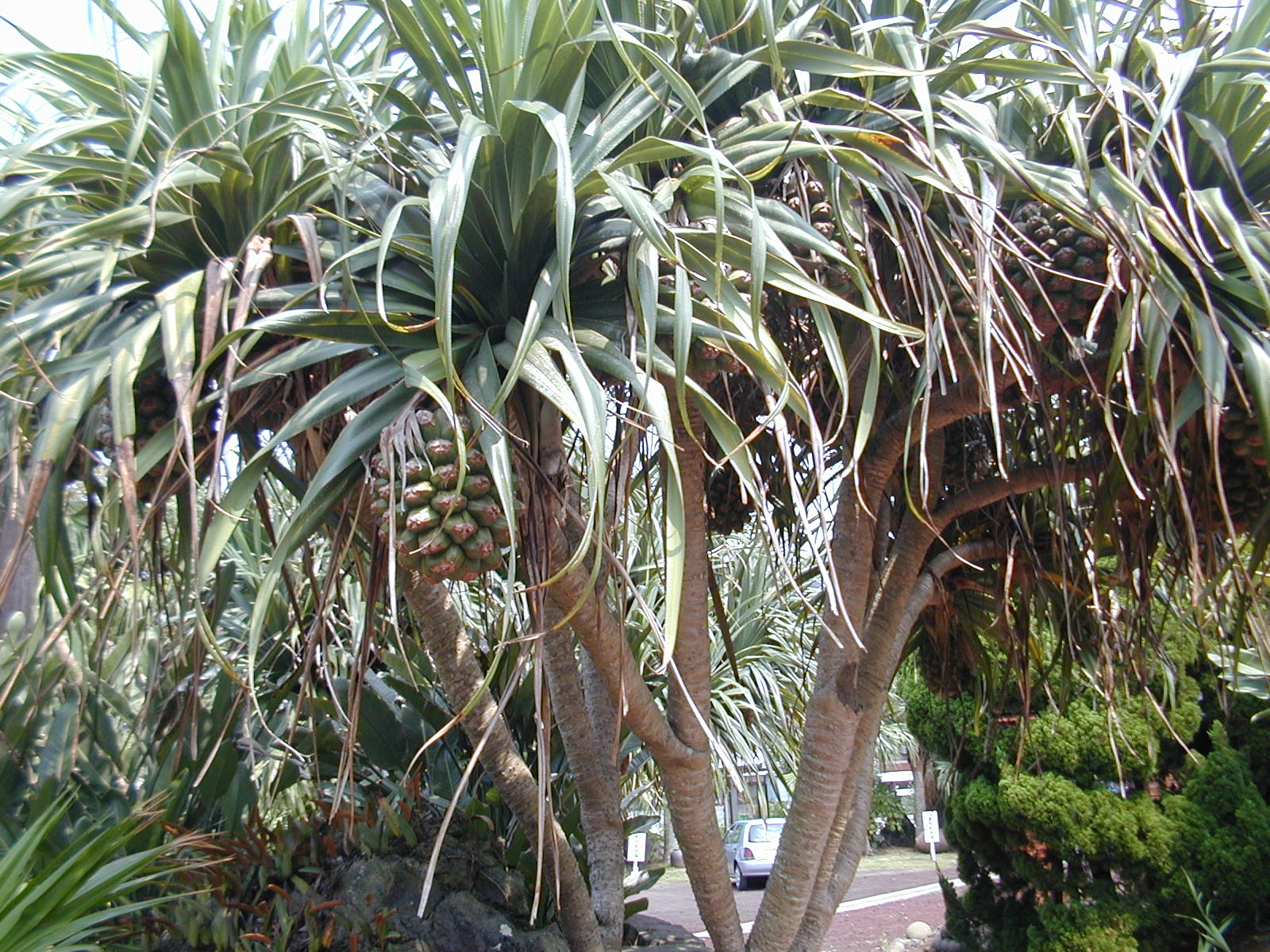

Conservation status
- Least Concern (IUCN 3.1)

Scientific classification
- Kingdom: Plantae
- Clade: Tracheophytes
- Clade: Angiosperms
- Clade: Monocots
- Order: Pandanales
- Family: Pandanaceae
- Genus: Pandanus
- Species: P. boninensis

Binomial name
- Pandanus boninensis Warb.

= Pandanus boninensis =

Species of flowering plant

Pandanus boninensis is an Asian species of plant that is endemic to and common in the Distylium-Schima dry forests and Raphiolepis-Livistona dry forests of the Bonin Islands, Japan. It has aerial prop roots and grows on rocks. The beetle, Phylloplatypus pandani is a leaf miner that consumes the leaves of P. boninensis, it was first described by scientists in 1998. The fungus, Kodonospora tetracolumnaris was isolated from dead leaves of P. boninensis and described in 1993.
