= Dante Carver =

American actor (born 1977)

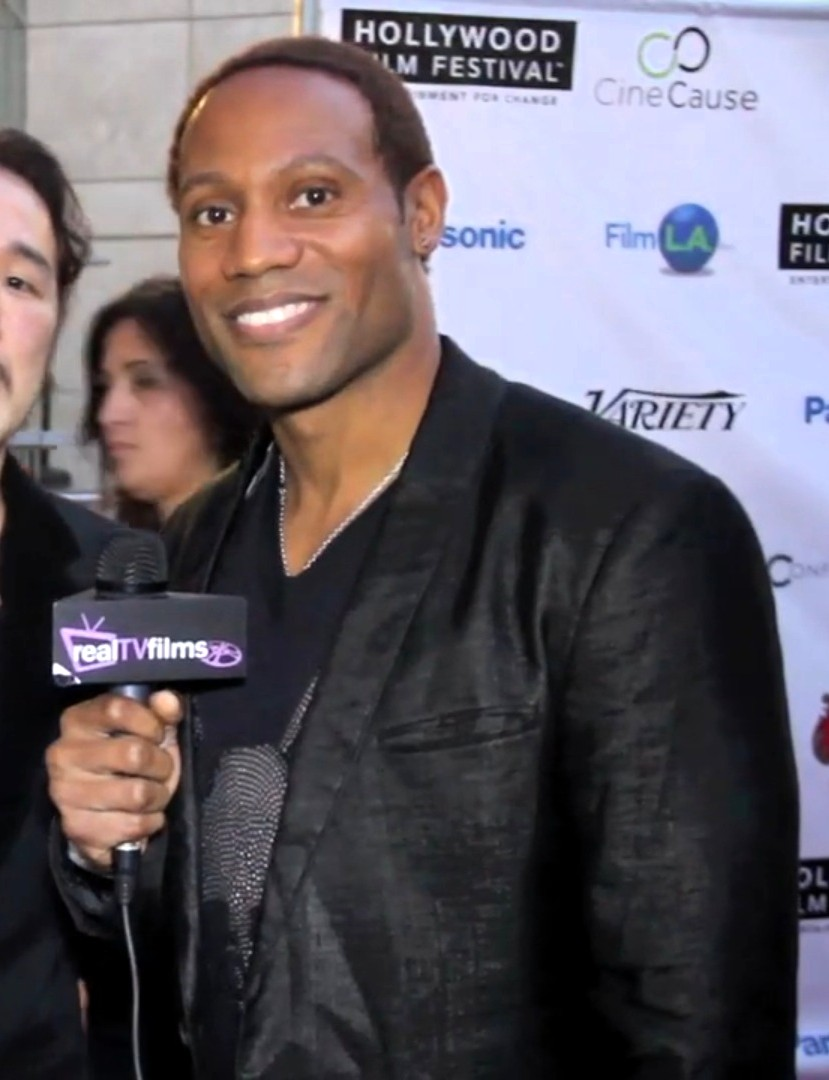
- Carver in 2014
- Born: 17 January 1977 (age 49); Brooklyn, New York, U.S.
- Occupation: Actor
- Years active: 2005–present
- Spouse: Akiko Matsumoto (m. 2010; div. 2017)
- Children: 2

Dante Carver (カーバー・ダンテ, Kāvā Dante; born 17 January 1977) is an American actor based in Japan. He moved to Japan in 2005 and became well known following his appearance in a series of TV commercials for SoftBank Mobile from 2006 in which he first played the Japanese-speaking "Yosō Guy" (予想GUY) character (the name being a pun on yosōgai (予想外), the Japanese for "unexpected") and later the older brother of the character played by Aya Ueto as part of the fictional "White family" headed by a white Hokkaido dog.

In 2008, Carver was voted the most popular male actor in a TV commercial in Japan, beating Takuya Kimura, who had previously held the top position for eight consecutive years.

== Private life ==
A native of New York City, Carver attended Virginia Commonwealth University in Richmond, Virginia, studying International Business.

On August 4, 2010, Carver married former model Akiko Matsumoto. They formally celebrated the marriage in a wedding ceremony in April 2011.

== TV commercials ==
- Diet Coke, 2006
- SoftBank Mobile (May 2006–Present), "Yosō Guy" (予想ＧＵＹ) aka Gorō Noguchi (野口 五郎, Noguchi Gorō), "Oniisan" (お兄さん; "big bro") aka Kojirō Shirato (白戸 小次郎, Shirato Kojirō)
- UHA Mikakuto (November 2007)

== TV series ==
- Kaze ni Maiagaru Vinyl Sheet (風に舞いあがるビニールシート) (NHK, May 2009–), UNHCR worker
- "Be Pon Kiki" ([Fuji TV], April 2008~)
- "Yamato Nadeshiko Shichi Henge" (ヤマトナデシコ七変化) ([TBS], April - March 2010) (Episode 10)

== Films ==
- Kansen Rettō (感染列島); English title: Pandemic (2009), WHO physician Klaus David
- Kaze ga tsuyoku fuiteiru (風が強く吹いている); English title: Feel the wind (2009)
- My Darling Is a Foreigner (2010)
- Yazima Beauty Salon The Movie: Reaching a Nevada Dream (矢島美容室 THE MOVIE ～夢をつかまネバダ～, Yajima Biyō Shitsu THE MOVIE ~Yume o Tsukama Nebada~) (2010)
- Nanase Futatabi: The Movie (2010) as Henry
- Kamen Rider × Kamen Rider Fourze & OOO: Movie War Mega Max (2012), Foundation X Member
- Shōjo no Piero ㊤ (少女のピエロ ㊤); English Title: The Doll (2017) as Ijiro (voice)
- Biohazard: Vendetta ( バイオハザード ヴェンデッタ); English Title: Resident Evil: Vendetta (2017) as D.C. (Motion Capture)
- Ultra Galaxy Fight, The Destined Crossroad (2022) as Ultraman Scott (voice)

== CD releases ==
- "Nonbiri Ikō" (のんびり行こう) (Pony Canyon, September 2008) with Mike Maki

== Video games ==
- Metal Gear Solid V: The Phantom Pain (Konami, 2015) CFA Executive "Doom Kangaroo"
