= Bonin Islands =

Japanese archipelago in the North Pacific Ocean

UNESCO World Heritage Site
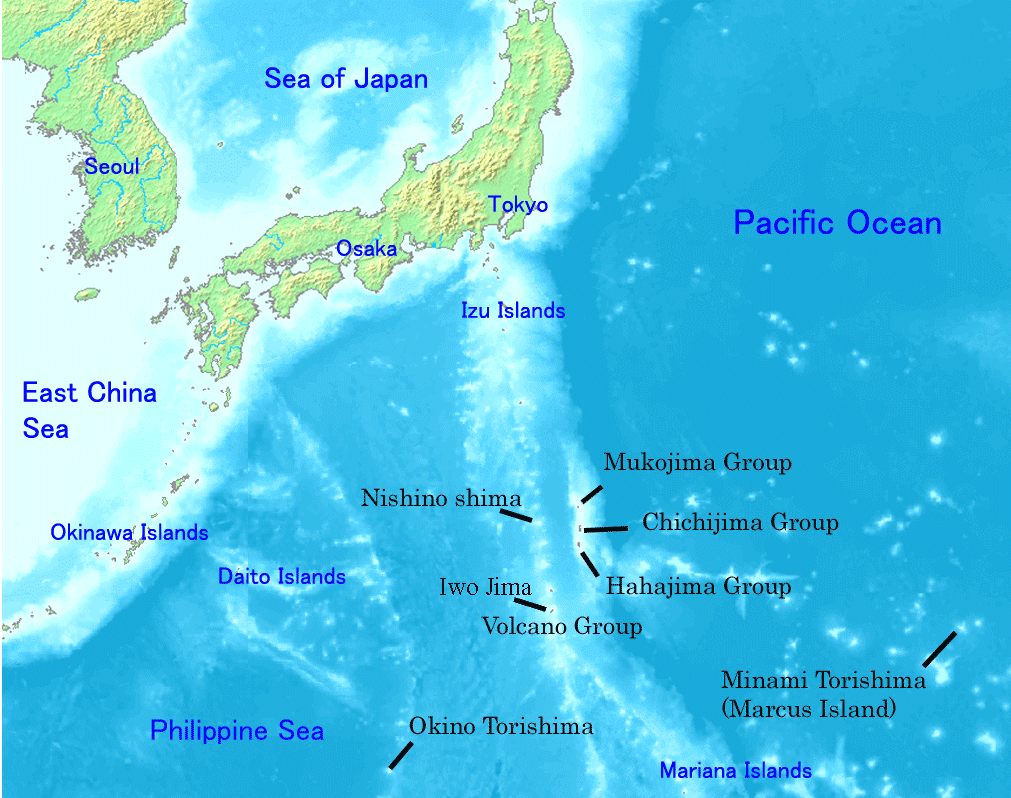
- The Bonin Islands or the Ogasawara Islands comprises three main island groups—Chichijima, Hahajima, and Mukojima—located SSE of Tokyo. Administratively, they also include the nearby Volcano Islands (including Iwo Jima).

- Location within Oceania
- Official name: Ogasawara Islands
- Location: Japan
- Includes: Islands, reefs, and marine areas
- Criteria: Natural: (ix)
- Reference: 1362
- Inscription: 2011 (35th Session)
- Area: 7,939 ha (30.65 sq mi)
- Coordinates: 27°43′6″N 142°5′59″E

The Bonin Islands, also known as the Ogasawara Islands (Japanese: 小笠原諸島), are a Japanese archipelago of over 30 subtropical and tropical islands located around 1,000 kilometers (620 mi) SSE of Tokyo and 1,600 kilometers (1,000 mi) northwest of Guam. The group as a whole has a total area of 84 square kilometers (32 sq mi) but only two of the islands are permanently inhabited, Chichijima and Hahajima. Together, their population was 2,560 as of 2021. Administratively, Tokyo's Ogasawara Subprefecture also includes the settlements on the Volcano Islands and the Self-Defense Force post on Iwo Jima. The seat of government is Chichijima.

Because of the Bonins' isolation, many of their animals and plants have undergone unique evolutionary processes. They have been referred to as the "Galápagos of the Orient" and were named a Natural World Heritage Site in 2011. When first reached during the early modern period, the islands were entirely uninhabited, although subsequent research has found evidence of some prehistoric habitation by Micronesians. Upon their repeated rediscoveries, the islands were largely ignored by the Spanish, Dutch, and isolationist Japanese until finally being claimed by a passing British captain in 1827. American, European, and Hawaiian colonists arrived from the Kingdom of Hawaii in 1830. Subsequently, Meiji Japan successfully colonized and reclaimed the islands in 1875, but Bonin Islanders' community continued up to World War II, when most islanders were forcibly relocated to Honshu. Following Japan's defeat, the US Navy occupied the island, bulldozing existing Japanese homes and restricting resettlement until full control of the Bonins was returned to Japan in 1968. Ethnically, the island is now majority Japanese but remains unusually diverse, which is reflected in the local Creole language known as Bonin English. Improved transportation has made agriculture more profitable and encouraged tourism, but the development required for an airport remains a contentious local issue.

== Names ==
Carte des Îles Bo-Nin ou Inhabitées, the map accompanying Abel-Rémusat's 1817 article

The name Bonin comes from an 1817 article in the French Journal des Savans by Jean-Pierre Abel-Rémusat in which—among various other misunderstandings of his source material—he misread a description of the islands as uninhabited (無人嶋, "desert island[s]") for their actual name, used the wrong reading of the characters (buninshima for mujintō), and then transcribed the resulting reading incorrectly into French as Bo-nin Sima, which eventually lost its original hyphen.

The name Ogasawara (小笠原, [ogasawaɾa]) literally means "little hat-shaped field(s)" but is used for the islands in honor of Ogasawara Sadayori (小笠原 貞頼), a supposed ancestor of the ronin Ogasawara Sadatō (小笠原 貞任) fictitiously credited with the discovery of the chain. Within Japanese, the Bonins proper are known as the "Ogasawara Islands" or "Group" (小笠原群島, Ogasawara-guntō) while the "Ogasawara Islands" or "Archipelago" (小笠原諸島, Ogasawara-shotō) is a wider term including the other islands of the Ogasawara Municipality (小笠原村, Ogasawara-mura) and its coterminous Ogasawara Subprefecture (小笠原支庁, Ogasawara-shichō)—namely, the Volcano Islands and three remote islands of Nishinoshima, Minamitorishima, and Okinotorishima. These islands are parts of Japan's Nanpō Islands.

The islands were also formerly known to Europeans as the Archbishop Islands (Spanish: Islas del Arzobispo), probably in honor of Pedro Moya de Contreras, archbishop of Mexico and viceroy of New Spain, who sent an expedition to the area in the late 16th century.

== History ==
=== Prehistory ===
At the end of the 20th century, prehistoric tools and carved stones were discovered on North Iwo Jima and Chichijima, establishing that the islands were previously home to at least some members of an unknown Micronesian people.

=== Early modern period ===
The first recorded visit by Europeans to the islands happened on 2 October 1543, when the Spanish explorer Bernardo de la Torre on the San Juan sighted Haha-jima, which he charted as Forfana. The islands were uninhabited at that time. Japanese discovery of the islands occurred in Kanbun 10 (1670) and was followed by a shogunate expedition in Enpō 3 (1675). The islands were then referred to as Bunin jima (無人島, Buninjima), literally "the uninhabited islands". Shimaya Ichizaemon, the explorer at the order of the shogunate, inventoried several species of trees and birds, but after his expedition, the shogunate abandoned any plans to develop the remote islands.

The first published description of the islands in the West was brought to Europe by Isaac Titsingh in 1796. His small library of Japanese books included Sangoku Tsūran Zusetsu (三国通覧図説, An Illustrated Description of Three Countries) by Hayashi Shihei. This book, which was published in Japan in 1785, briefly described the Ogasawara Islands.

These groups were collectively called the Archbishop Islands in Spanish sources of the 18th–19th century, most likely due to an expedition organized by Pedro Moya de Contreras, archbishop of Mexico and viceroy of New Spain, to explore the northern Pacific and the islands of Japan. Its main objective was to find the long sought but legendary islands of Rica de Oro ("Rich in Gold"), Rica de Plata ("Rich in Silver"), and the Islas del Armenio ("Islands of the Armenian"). After several years of planning and frustrated initial attempts, the expedition finally set sail on 12 July 1587, commanded by Pedro de Unamuno. Even if it did revisit the Daitō Islands, already charted by Bernardo de la Torre in 1543, the expedition could not find the wanted islands after searching the positions where they were charted in contemporary references. Japanese maps at the time seem to have been rather inaccurate, to the point that some contemporaries considered them to have been deliberately misleading to discourage colonization attempts by foreign nations. Frederick William Beechey used the Spanish name as late as 1831, believing that the Japanese "Boninsima" were entirely different islands.

=== 19th century ===
On 12 September 1824, American Captain James Coffin in the whaler Transit first visited the southern group of islands (Coffin Islands). He revisited the archipelago in 1825, but this time, he arrived at the middle group of islands (Beechey Group).

In September 1825, the British whaling ship Supply landed in the southern Bailey Group of islands. In 1826, another British whaler, William, arrived at Beechey Island. Whaling ships called regularly for water and turtles before continuing their voyages.

In 1827, Captain F. W. Beechey of HMS Blossom reached the island chain and claimed them as a British possession. A copper plate was removed from Blossom's hull and left on a beach as a marker of the claim:

HBM Ship Blossom Capt F. W. Beechey took possession of this Group of Islands in the Name of and on the behalf of His Britannic Majesty George the IV on the 14th June 1827.

He also named the island of Chichijima "Peel" after then British Home Secretary Sir Robert Peel. Beechey was also surprised to find two men living on the islands. They remained on the islands after the William left the year before in 1826. The men were Wittrein and Petersen.

In 1830, with the help of the British Consul to the Sandwich Islands (Hawaii), Richard Charlton, Richard Millichamp, and Matteo Mazzaro sailed to the islands. The first permanent colony was made up of Nathaniel Savory of Bradford, Massachusetts, America, Richard Millichamp of Devon, England; Matteo Mazzaro of Ragusa/Dubrovnik, Austrian Empire (now in Croatia); Alden B. Chapin and Nathaniel Savory of Boston; Carl Johnsen of Copenhagen; as well as seven unnamed men and 13 women from the Kingdom of Hawaii. They found the climate suitable for farming and the raising of livestock. Rum was made from cane sugar, and bordellos were opened, sometimes staffed by women kidnapped from other island chains. Whalers and other ships that could not find another friendly port in Japan often visited the Bonins for provision and recreation.

Two years later, the Oriental Translation Fund of Great Britain and Ireland published a posthumous, abridged publication of Titsingh's French translation of Sankoku Tsūran Zusetsu.

Further settlers arrived in 1846 aboard the whaling ship Howard. They established themselves initially in South Island. One of them, a woman from the Caroline Islands named Hypa, died in 1897 at the age of about 112, after being baptized on her deathbed.

Commodore Matthew C. Perry of the United States Navy visited the islands in 1853 and bought a property at Port Lloyd from Savory for $50. The US "Colony of Peel Island" (Chichijima) was created, and Savory was appointed governor.

In 1853 there were Peel Island 31 inhabitants, made up as follows; four English, four American, one Portuguese, the rest being natives from either the Sandwich, the Ladrones, the Caroline or Kingsmill islands, together with children born on the Bonins.

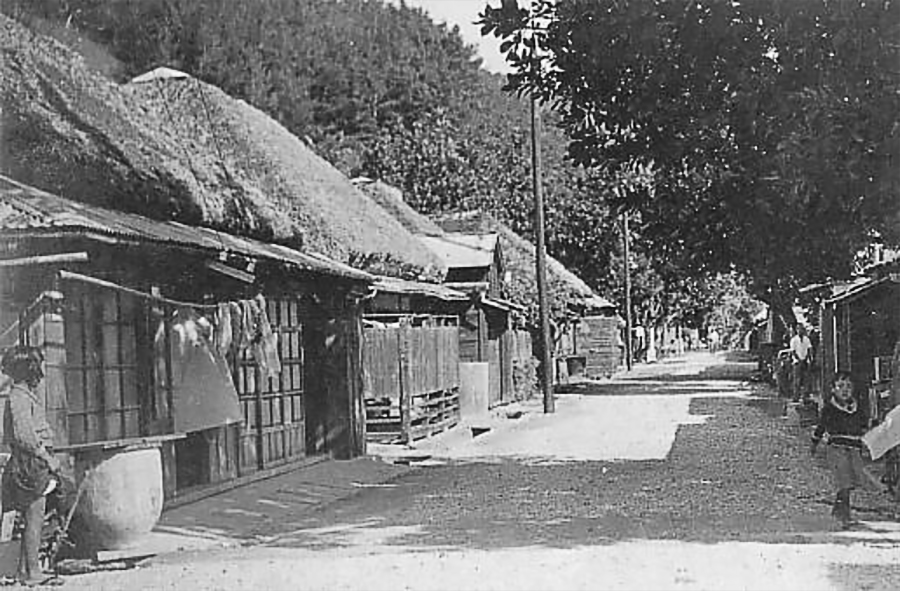
A village in the Bonins during the early Shōwa period

In January 1862 (Bunkyū 1), the Tokugawa shogunate of Japan claimed the islands in a short-lived colonial enterprise. The shogunal steamboat Kanrin Maru was dispatched to the islands with a crew of cartographers, physicians, and prominent bureaucrats. The islands were officially renamed Ogasawara, referring to the legendary Japanese discoverer from the late 16th century. This tentative colonization, however, did not last for long. In the summer of 1863, under foreign pressure, the shogunate ordered the evacuation of the islands.

In 1875, the Japanese Meiji government reclaimed the islands. The Japanese names of each island were resolved, and 38 settlers from Hachijojima were sent the following year. In 1876, the islands were put under the direct control of the Home Ministry. Further foreign settlements were banned, and the government assisted settlers who wished to relocate from mainland Japan. The islands' forests were also reduced to use the land for sugar cane production. Colonists largely segregated themselves in two different villages, one for the Bonin Islanders and the other for the Japanese. Bonin Islanders were eventually granted Japanese nationality in 1882. Jack London visited the islands in 1893 and published an account of his sojourn.

=== 20th century ===
Lionel Cholmondeley compiled a history of the islands over several years, publishing it in 1915.

In 1917, 60–70 Bonin islanders claimed ancestry among the 19th-century English-speaking settlers; however, in 1941, no Bonin people would acknowledge descent from these early colonists. The current residents include some who claim to be related to Nathaniel Savory. In the winter of 1920–1921, Russian Futurist painter David Burliuk lived in the Bonin Islands and painted several landscapes of the islands.

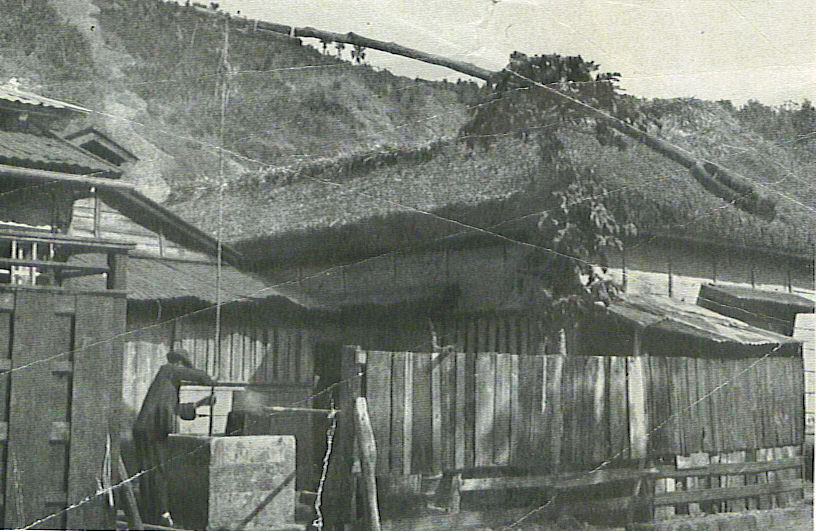
A man at a well, alongside buildings with the thatched roofs, weather-beaten unpainted sides and paper partitions and windows, characteristic of the islands before World War II

Bonin islanders were relegated to an insignificant status until the early Shōwa period. After Japan attacked the American naval base at Pearl Harbor, English was banned on the Bonins, and Bonin Islanders had to take on Japanese names. As fighting crept closer to Japan during the later stage of World War II, most inhabitants were forcibly evacuated to the mainland. There was a Japanese military base on Chichijima run by a Major Sueo Matoba (的場 末男, Matoba Sueo), who was known for engaging in cannibalism and other heinous acts on prisoners of war. The torpedo bomber of later American President George H. W. Bush crashed in the ocean near Chichijima. He ended up getting rescued by USS Finback and becoming the only one to survive ultimately. Eight other airmen downed near the islands were later executed and cannibalized by the Japanese soldiers. After the war, Lieutenant General Tachibana, Major Matoba, and Captain Yoshii were found guilty and hanged. The Battle of Iwo Jima in 1945, one of the fiercest battles of World War II, was fought on a garrison island in this region of the Pacific.

Following Japan's surrender, the islands were controlled by the United States Navy for the next 23 years, which the Westerners referred to as "Navy Time". All residents except those descended from the original settlers (Bonin Islanders) and/or related to them by marriage were expelled, while Bonin Islanders (inhabitants of White American or European, Micronesian or Polynesian ancestry) were allowed to return. Vacant properties of exiled Japanese were bulldozed as part of the Navy's management of nuclear weapons on Chichijima. In 1956, the residents petitioned for American annexation of the islands but received no response. In 1968, the United States government returned the Bonins to Japanese control. Bonin Islanders could either become Japanese nationals or receive American citizenship and repatriate to the United States. The majority remained in the islands as Japanese citizens. Initially, 600 Japanese relocated to the islands, growing to about 2,000 by the end of the 20th century.

=== 21st century ===
The Bonins were named a natural World Heritage Site on 24 June 2011.

== Economy ==
Historically, the Bonin Islands consisted of subsistence farming with some exploitation of timber and grazing land for export to the mainland. With improved transportation, it has developed as a tourist destination, particularly for Japanese interested in scuba diving and ecotourism. Foreign tourists are also sometimes drawn by the islands' remoteness and unusually mixed local culture. Refrigeration has also allowed for the greater exportation of fruits and vegetables. Coffee bushes have also recently been introduced successfully.

Some government agencies are also involved with the islands. A 25-metre-diameter (82 ft) radio telescope is located in Chichijima, one of the stations of the very-long-baseline interferometry (VLBI) Exploration of Radio Astrometry (VERA) project. It is operated by the National Astronomical Observatory of Japan.

== Geography and administration ==
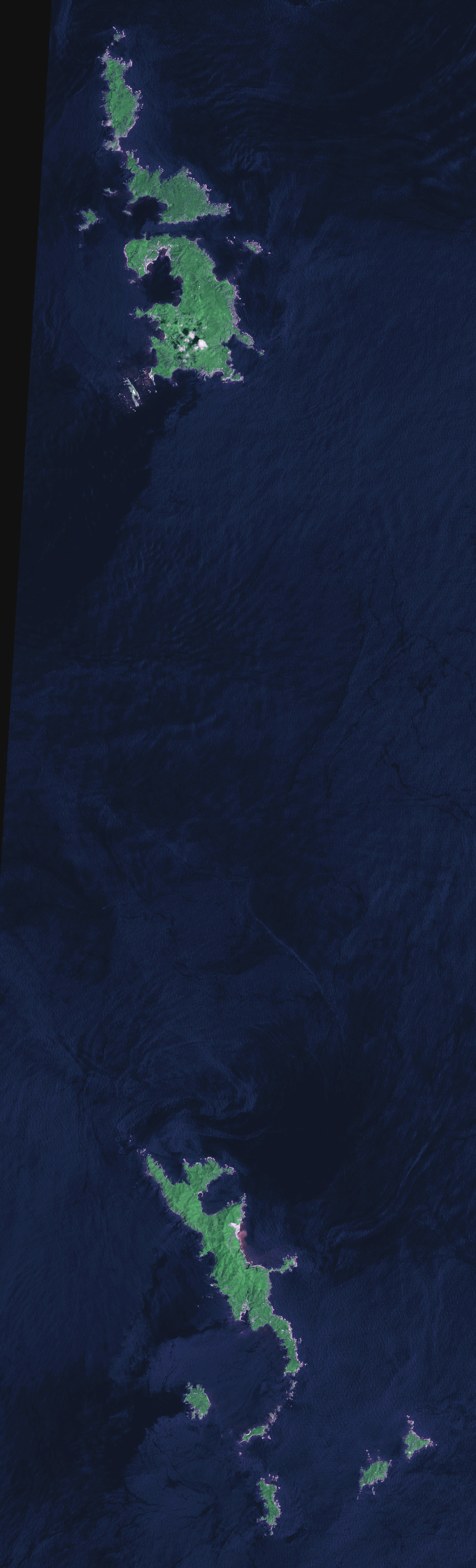
Satellite photo of Chichijima and Hahajima

The Bonin Islands consist of three subgroups. Their former names come from a variety of sources, but their Japanese ones generally reflect a family:

- Muko-jima Group (聟島列島 Muko-jima Rettō), formerly the Parry Group
  - Muko-jima (聟島, lit. 'Bridegroom Island')
  - Yome-jima (嫁島, lit. 'Bride Island'), formerly Kater Island
  - Nakōdo-jima or Nakadachi-jima (媒島, lit. 'Matchmaker Island')
  - Kita-no-jima (北の島 or 北島, lit. 'Northern Island')
  - Mae-jima (前島, lit. 'Front Island'), formerly The Ears
- Chichi-jima Group (父島列島 Chichi-jima Rettō), formerly the Beechey Group
  - Chichi-jima (父島, lit. 'Father Island'), formerly the Main Island or Peel Island
  - Ani-jima (兄島, lit. 'Elder Brother Island'), formerly Hog Island or Buckland Island
  - Otōto-jima (弟島, lit. 'Younger Brother Island'), formerly North Island or Stapleton Island
  - Mago-jima (孫島 lit. 'Grandchild Island')
  - Higashi-jima (東島 lit. 'East Island')
  - Nishi-jima (西島 lit. 'West Island'), formerly Goat Island
  - Minami-jima (南島 lit. 'South Island'), formerly Knorr Island
- Haha-jima Group (母島列島 Haha-jima Rettō), formerly the Baily Group or Coffin Islands
  - Haha-jima (母島, lit. 'Mother Island'), formerly Hillsborough Island
  - Mukō-jima (向島, lit. 'Yonder Island'), formerly Plymouth Island
  - Hira-jima or Taira-jima (平島, lit. 'Flat Island')
  - Ane-jima (姉島, lit. 'Elder Sister Island'), formerly Perry Island
  - Imōto-jima (妹島, lit. 'Younger Sister Island'), formerly Kelly Island
  - Mei-jima (姪島, lit. 'Niece Island')

Although not part of the Bonins (小笠原群島, Ogasawara-guntō) geographically, the nearby Volcano Islands, Nishinoshima (Rosario Island), Okinotorishima (Parece Vela), and Minamitorishima (Marcus Island) are organized as part of Ogasawara municipality (小笠原村, Ogasawara-mura). Ogasawara itself is organized as a subprefecture of Tokyo. In Japanese, the geographical expression for the full range of the municipality is the "Ogasawara Archipelago" (小笠原諸島, Ogasawara-shotō), which in turn is sometimes calqued back into English as another meaning for "the Bonin Islands".

== Geology ==
The Bonin Islands are a part of the Izu–Bonin–Mariana arc of Pacific islands. A fore arc, they lie above the subduction zone where the Pacific Plate slides beneath the Philippine Sea Plate. This began during the Eocene, simultaneously producing the deep Bonin Trench to the east about 50 million years ago and prolonged volcanic activity that created the islands on the west around 48 million years ago. The Bonins are mostly composed of an andesitic volcanic rock called boninite, rich in magnesium oxide, chromium, and silicon dioxide. They may represent the exposed parts of an ophiolite that has not yet been emplaced on oceanic crust. Although the area is currently dormant, most of the islands still have steep shorelines, often with sea cliffs ranging from 50 to 100 meters (160 to 330 ft) high.

The Volcano Islands are much younger and still geologically active. Iwo Jima is a dormant volcano characterized by rapid uplift and several hot springs. The highest point in the entire chain lies on South Iwo Jima, at 916 meters (3,005 ft). In November 2013, a new volcanic island formed offshore from Nishinoshima and eventually merged with it.

The islands are fringed with healthy coral reefs and have many small beaches.

== Climate ==
The climate of the Bonin Islands ranges from a humid subtropical climate (Köppen climate classification Cfa) to tropical monsoon climate (Köppen climate classification Am).

The climate of Chichijima is on the boundary between the humid subtropical climate (Köppen classification Cfa) and the tropical monsoon climate (Köppen classification Am). Temperatures are warm to hot all year round due to the warm currents from the North Pacific gyre surrounding the island. Rainfall is less heavy than in most parts of mainland Japan since the island is too far south to be influenced by the Aleutian Low and too far from Asia to receive monsoonal rainfall or orographic precipitation on the equatorward side of the Siberian High. The wettest months are May and September, while the driest are January and February.

Climate data for Chichijima (1991–2020)
Month	Jan	Feb	Mar	Apr	May	Jun	Jul	Aug	Sep	Oct	Nov	Dec	Year
Mean daily maximum °C (°F)	20.7 (69.3)	20.5 (68.9)	21.7 (71.1)	23.4 (74.1)	25.6 (78.1)	28.5 (83.3)	30.4 (86.7)	30.3 (86.5)	29.9 (85.8)	28.6 (83.5)	25.9 (78.6)	22.7 (72.9)	25.7 (78.3)
Daily mean °C (°F)	18.5 (65.3)	18.1 (64.6)	19.3 (66.7)	21.1 (70.0)	23.4 (74.1)	26.2 (79.2)	27.7 (81.9)	28.0 (82.4)	27.7 (81.9)	26.4 (79.5)	23.8 (74.8)	20.6 (69.1)	23.4 (74.1)
Mean daily minimum °C (°F)	15.8 (60.4)	15.4 (59.7)	16.8 (62.2)	18.8 (65.8)	21.4 (70.5)	24.4 (75.9)	25.6 (78.1)	26.1 (79.0)	25.7 (78.3)	24.4 (75.9)	21.6 (70.9)	18.2 (64.8)	21.2 (70.2)
Average rainfall mm (inches)	63.6 (2.50)	51.6 (2.03)	75.8 (2.98)	113.3 (4.46)	151.9 (5.98)	111.8 (4.40)	79.5 (3.13)	123.3 (4.85)	144.2 (5.68)	141.7 (5.58)	136.1 (5.36)	103.3 (4.07)	1,296.1 (51.02)
Average rainy days (≥ 0.5 mm)	11.0	8.5	9.8	10.0	11.8	8.8	8.6	11.3	13.4	13.7	12.0	11.2	130.1
Average relative humidity (%)	66	68	72	79	84	86	82	82	82	81	76	70	77
Mean monthly sunshine hours	131.3	138.3	159.2	148.3	151.8	205.6	246.8	213.7	197.7	173.2	139.1	125.3	2,030.3
Source: Japan Meteorological Agency

The easternmost island, Minamitorishima or Marcus Island, has a tropical savanna climate (Köppen classification Aw) with warm to hot temperatures throughout the year. The wettest months are July and August, while the driest are February and March.

Climate data for Minamitorishima or Marcus Island (1991–2020)
Month	Jan	Feb	Mar	Apr	May	Jun	Jul	Aug	Sep	Oct	Nov	Dec	Year
Mean daily maximum °C (°F)	24.6 (76.3)	24.3 (75.7)	25.3 (77.5)	27.1 (80.8)	29.0 (84.2)	31.0 (87.8)	31.3 (88.3)	31.0 (87.8)	30.9 (87.6)	30.2 (86.4)	28.7 (83.7)	26.7 (80.1)	28.3 (82.9)
Daily mean °C (°F)	22.4 (72.3)	21.8 (71.2)	22.5 (72.5)	24.3 (75.7)	26.1 (79.0)	28.0 (82.4)	28.5 (83.3)	28.4 (83.1)	28.5 (83.3)	27.9 (82.2)	26.5 (79.7)	24.5 (76.1)	25.8 (78.4)
Mean daily minimum °C (°F)	20.3 (68.5)	19.6 (67.3)	20.4 (68.7)	22.3 (72.1)	24.1 (75.4)	25.8 (78.4)	26.1 (79.0)	26.1 (79.0)	26.4 (79.5)	25.9 (78.6)	24.7 (76.5)	22.6 (72.7)	23.7 (74.7)
Average rainfall mm (inches)	69.7 (2.74)	43.4 (1.71)	56.0 (2.20)	59.6 (2.35)	100.6 (3.96)	44.3 (1.74)	139.8 (5.50)	177.1 (6.97)	94.8 (3.73)	89.6 (3.53)	83.0 (3.27)	90.8 (3.57)	1,052.8 (41.45)
Average rainy days (≥ 0.5 mm)	10.9	8.5	8.1	7.8	9.3	7.2	14.8	16.7	14.1	12.7	10.4	11.8	132.3
Average relative humidity (%)	70	70	74	79	79	77	77	79	79	78	76	74	76
Mean monthly sunshine hours	170.8	179.4	222.3	240.2	275.1	311.2	276.3	248.1	254.6	250.8	211.0	182.3	2,821.7
Source: Japan Meteorological Agency

== Ecology ==
=== Flora ===
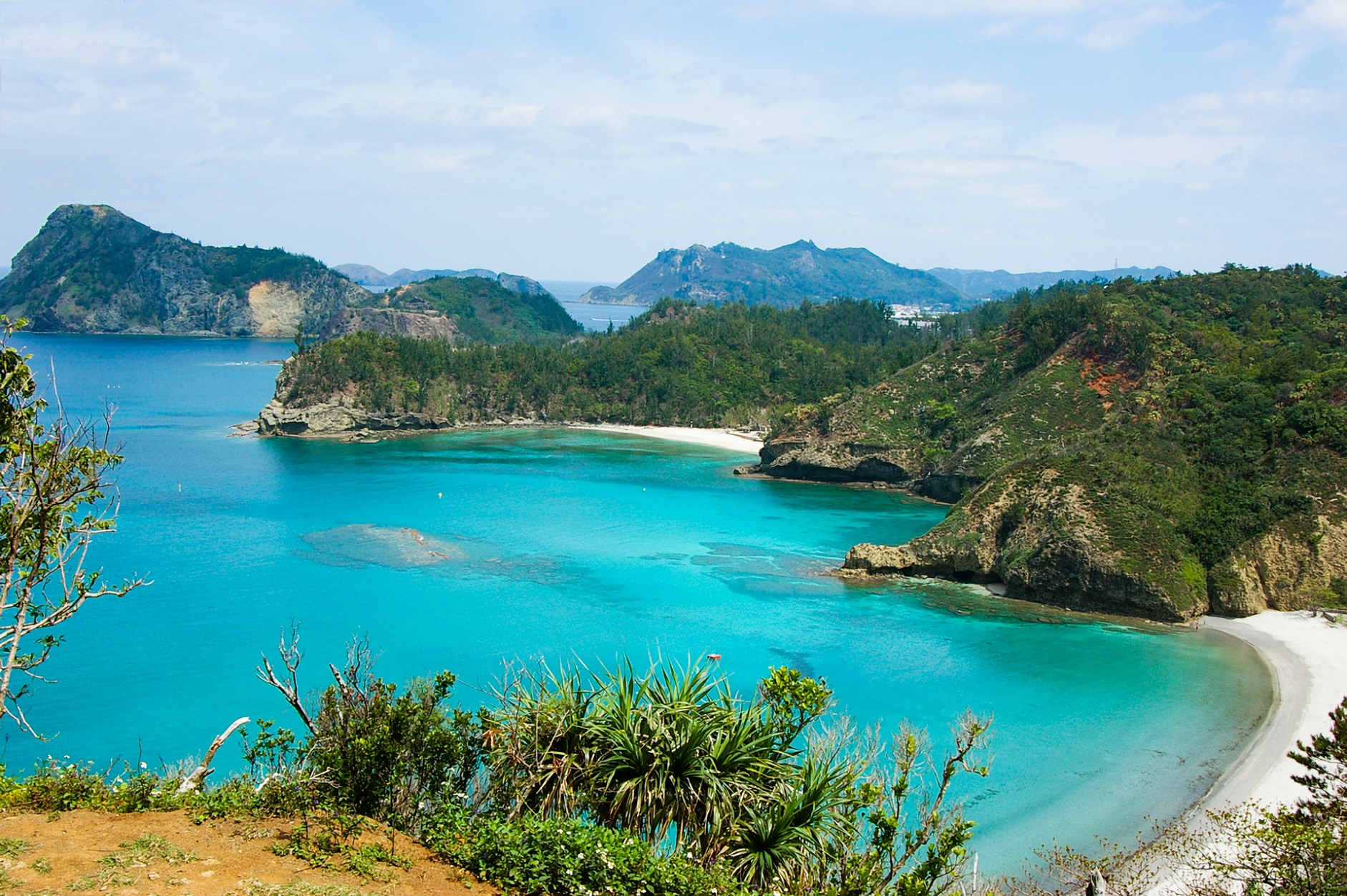
Kominato beach and Kopepe Beach, Chichi-jima

Flora have evolved differently on each of the islands. The Bonin Islands are sometimes referred to as the Galápagos of the Orient. They form a distinct subtropical moist broadleaf forest ecoregion, the Ogasawara subtropical moist forests. The ecoregion has a high degree of biodiversity and endemism. The islands are home to about 500 plant species, of which 43% are endemic. The forests are of three main types:

- Type I: Elaeocarpus–Ardisia mesic forest is found in moist lowland areas with deep soils. The forests have a closed canopy with a height of about 15 meters (49 ft), dominated by Ardisia sieboldii. Elaeocarpus photiniaefolius, Pisonia umbellifera, and Planchonella obovata are other important canopy species. These forests were almost completely destroyed by clearing for agriculture before 1945.
- Type II: Distylium–Raphiolepis–Schima dry forest is found in drier lowland and upland sites with shallower soils. It is also a closed-canopy forest, with a 4-to-8-meter (13 to 26 ft) canopy composed mostly of Distylium lepidotum, Rhaphiolepis integerrima, Schima mertensiana, Planchonella obovata, and Syzygium buxifolium. The Type II forests can be further subdivided into:
  - Type IIa: Distylium-Schima dry forest occurs in cloudy upland areas with fine-textured soils. These forests contain many rare and endemic species, with Pandanus boninensis and Syzygium buxifolium as the predominant trees.
  - Type IIb: Raphiolepis-Livistona dry forest is found in upland areas with few clouds and rocky soils. Rhaphiolepis integerrima is the dominant tree species, along with the fan palm Livistona boninensis, Pandanus boninensis and Ochrosia nakaiana.
- Type III: Distylium-Planchonella scrub forest is found on windy and dry mountain ridges and exposed sea cliffs. These forests have the highest species diversity on the islands. Distylium lepidotum and Planchonella obovata are the dominant species, growing from 0.5 to 1.5 meters (1.6 to 4.9 ft) tall. Other common shrubs are Myrsine okabeana, Symplocos kawakamii, and Pittosporum parvifolium.

These islands are home to the northernmost outliers of the palm genus Clinostigma. Clinostigma savoryanum is endemic and has been planted in Mediterranean climates with success. Other unique species include Metrosideros boninensis, a plant related to similar species growing in Fiji and New Caledonia.

=== Fauna ===
Due to its isolation and recent colonization, the Bonin Islands contain several endemic animal species, most of them recently extinct.

==== Birds ====
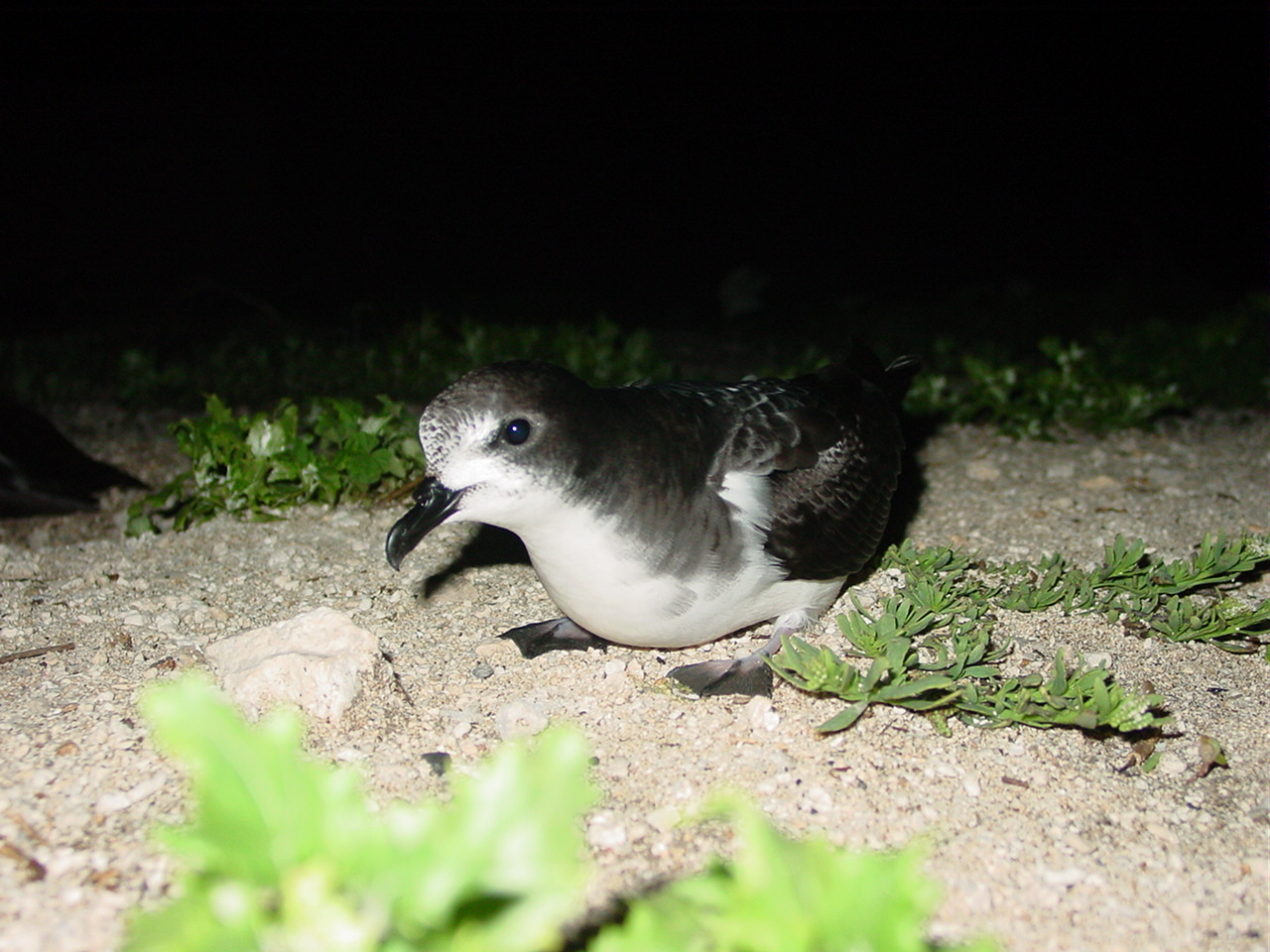
A Bonin petrel

The range of the Bonin petrel extends beyond the Bonins themselves to other islands in the North Pacific. There are two restricted-range species of birds on the islands, the Japanese wood pigeon (Columba janthina) and the near-threatened Bonin white-eye (Apalopteron familiare), formerly known as the Bonin honeyeater. The Japanese wood pigeon was extirpated from the Iwo Island groups in the 1980s. The formerly endemic Bonin pigeon (C. versicolor), Bonin thrush (Zoothera terrestris) and Bonin grosbeak (Carpodacus ferreorostris) are now extinct.

==== Mammals ====
A small extinct bat, Sturdee's pipistrelle, is only known in one record and has not been seen since 1915. The Bonin flying fox (Pteropus pselaphon), also called the Bonin fruit bat, is endemic to the islands. It is currently listed as endangered, and a survey published by the Ogasawara Office of Education in 1999 estimated their number at around 100. The Bonin sambar (R. unicolor boninensis), a subspecies of the sambar deer, was supposedly a population introduced to the islands only as late as 1850, but is also known from subfossil remains; it went extinct after 1925–26, when Richard Goldschmidt saw the taxidermied pair of the Chichijima museum and was told by locals that merely "half a dozen" animals remained alive

==== Invertebrates ====
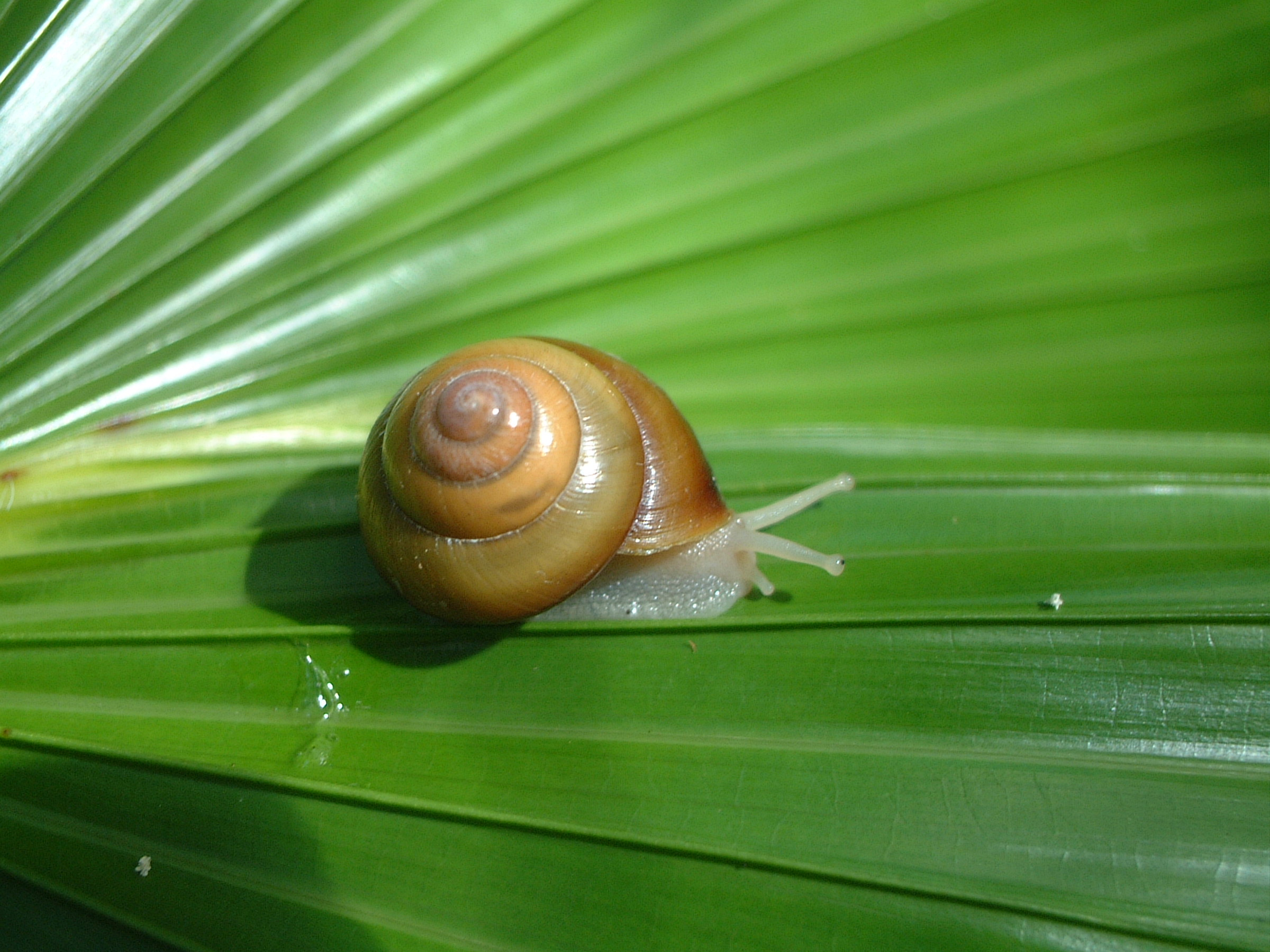
Mandarina suenoae on Anijima

The islands are also renowned for the many species of snails that are found across the islands, especially the Mandarina snails. Most of the native snails are now endangered or extinct because of introduced species and habitat loss. The giant squid (Architeuthis dux) was photographed off the Bonins for the first time in the wild on 30 September 2004. It was filmed alive there in December 2006.

== Transportation ==
=== Water transport ===
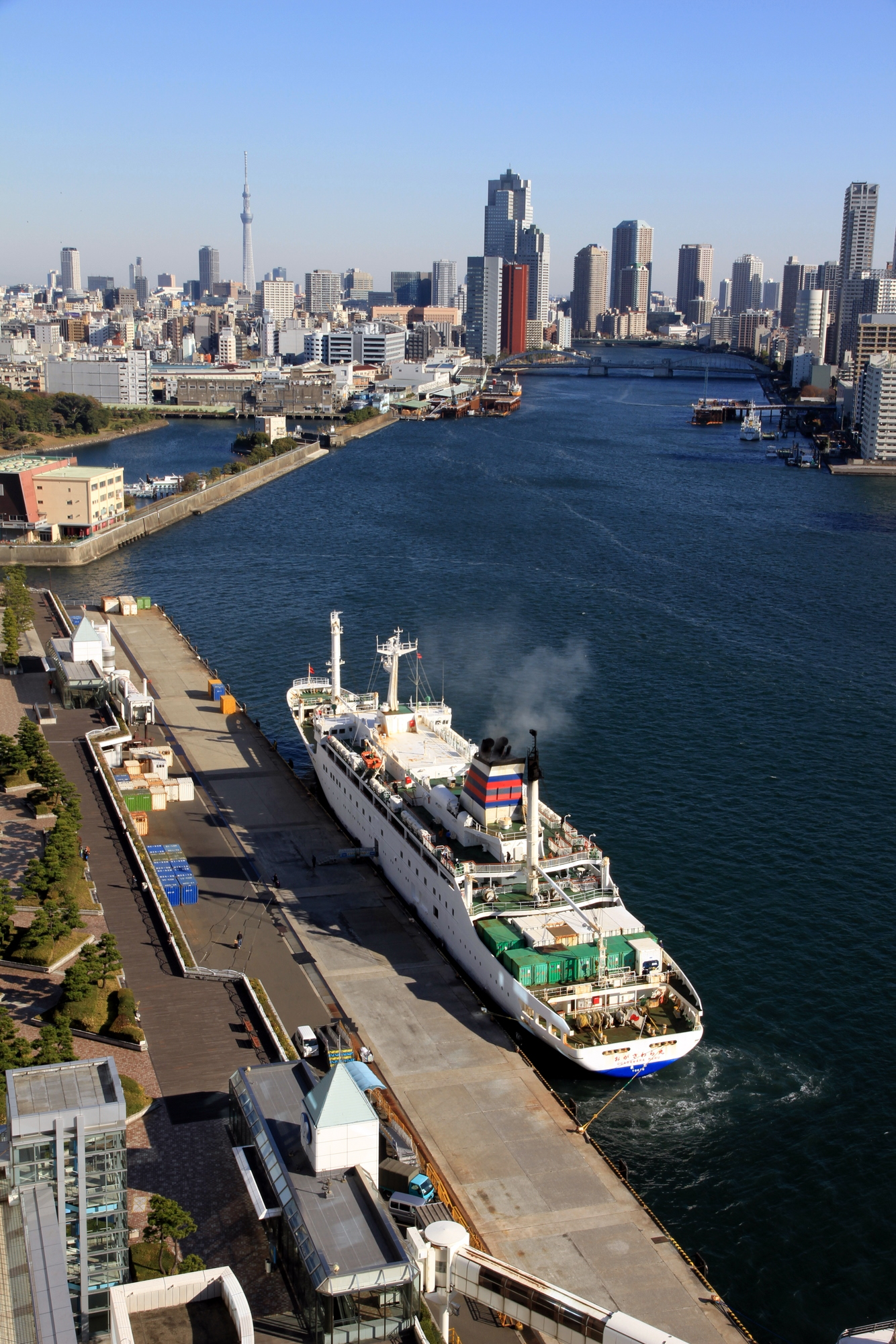
The Ogasawara Maru at Tokyo's Takeshiba pier. The liner travels between Tokyo and the Bonins.

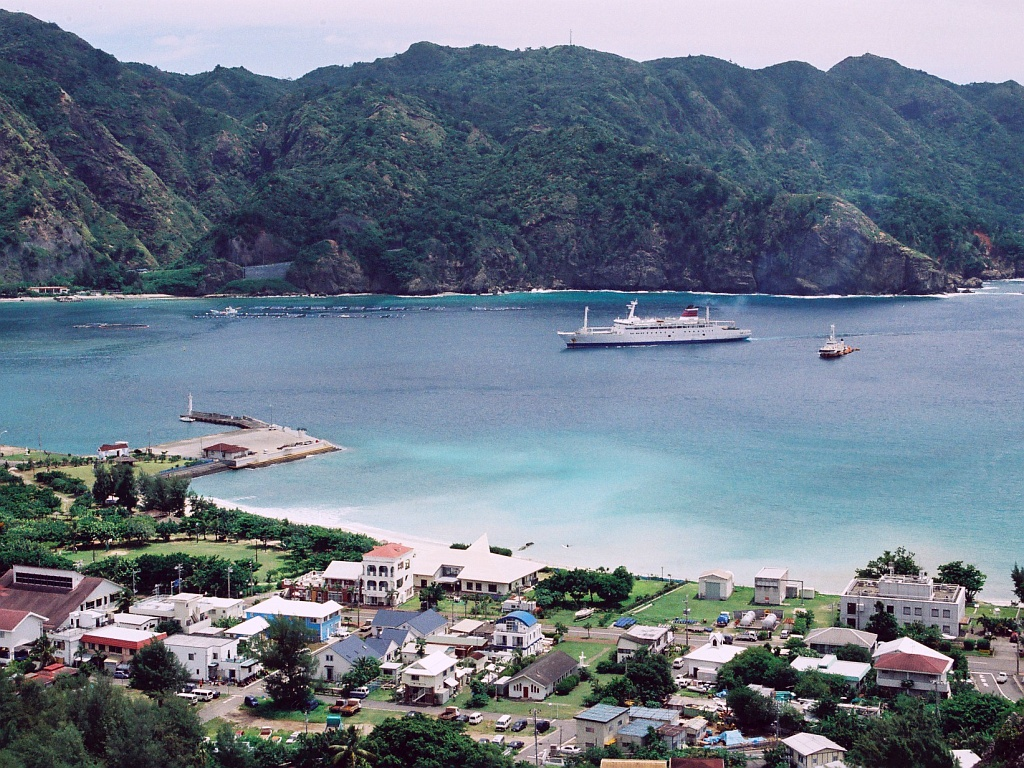
Futami Port, Chichi-jima, Ogasawara Village

The main port is Futami on Chichijima. Since 2016, the main line connecting the islands to the mainland is the Ogasawara Shipping Company (小笠原海運株式会社). It operates the Ogasawara Maru (おがさわら丸), an 11,035-ton 150-meter (490 ft) long vessel with 170 private rooms and a total capacity of 894 passengers. With a top speed of 24.7 knots (45.7 km/h; 28.4 mph), it makes the trip from Takeshiba Pier in Tokyo in about 24 hours in good weather. The number of monthly voyages varies, having fallen during the coronavirus pandemic.

Previously, there had been plans for a 14,500-ton "techno superliner" able to reach a maximum speed of 38 knots (70 km/h; 44 mph) and make the same journey in only 17 hours with a capacity of around 740 passengers. The project was canceled in July 2005, however, due to rising fuel prices and cost overruns of ¥2 billion.

Hahajima is reachable via the ferry Hahajima Maru from Chichijima.

=== Road transport ===
Ogasawara Village operates a bus service on Chichijima and elderly passengers may use a "silver pass". There is also a sightseeing taxi service, a rental car company, motorized scooter rental services, a bike rental service, and other amenities.

=== Air transport ===
The Bonins have no airport. During severe accidents, illnesses, and other emergencies, a helicopter is dispatched from the Self-Defense Force (SDF) post on Iwo Jima. The ShinMaywa US-1 seaplane from the SDF post at Iwakuni is used during visits by the Tokyo governor and other dignitaries and for any emergency requiring rapid transport back to Honshu.

For several decades, there has been talk of building a full airport. Sites on Chichijima and Anijima have both been rejected. Travel time to the mainland would be cut to around two hours, improving tourism and providing emergency services, and the national, regional, and local governments have all supported the idea in theory. Projects have lagged, however, due to concerns about their economic feasibility and concerns that the proposed sites are homes to numerous valuable, rare, or endangered plant species. Some locals have greatly desired an airport, while a desire to keep the islands' natural beauty untouched has prompted others to work to block one. The issue is quite controversial on the islands.

On 26 June 2016, the Japanese Minister of Environment Tamayo Marukawa talked about airport construction on the Bonins after the meeting in Tokyo commemorating the fifth anniversary of their registration as World Natural Heritage. At a 27 July 2017 meeting with Ogasawara Village, the Tokyo Metropolitan Government announced that it was considering opening a regular air route between Tokyo and the Bonins using a proposed 1,200 m (3,900 ft) runway that would be built on Chichijima. This would allow it to land propeller aircraft with up to 50 passengers. The Tokyo government said that construction would depend on future assessments of the impact on the natural environment and economic feasibility. Ogasawara Village supported the runway in preference to expanding either the current helicopter or seaplane access. In fiscal 2019, 490 million yen was included in the Japanese budget for a feasibility study and a survey on Chichijima to determine the best location to construct the runway. In August 2020, the Tokyo Metropolitan Government held a council during which it affirmed its desire to open an airport. Still, it claimed it would not occur until 2030 at the earliest. To address environmental concerns, they further proposed shortening the runway to about 500 meters (1,600 ft) and using tiltrotor aircraft to compensate.

== Demography, language, and education ==
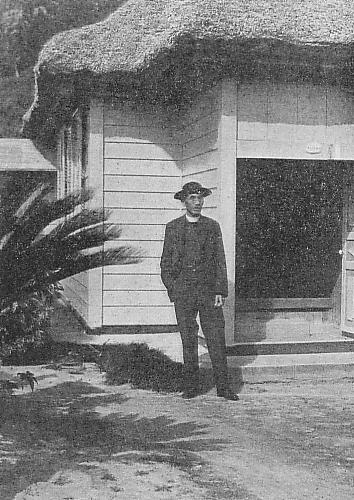
An islander, who appears to be a Christian clergyman of Bonin Islanders, in about 1930

In 2021, the Bonins had a population of 2560, divided between Chichijima (2120) and Hahajima (440). Virtually all of the Bonin Islands' permanent inhabitants are Japanese citizens. This includes a significant proportion of Bonin Islanders (ancestors from the United States, Europe, and other Pacific islands), who can often be distinguished by their physical features, family names spelled out with katakana, and adherence to Christianity. During and after the US military occupation of 1946–1968, a small minority of islanders opted for US citizenship and/or emigrated from the islands. However, most Bonin islanders now appear to be reassimilating with the ethnic Japanese majority.

Japanese is the common language. Because Bonin Islanders (settlers from the United States, Europe, and other Pacific islands) preceded ethnic Japanese settlers, an English-lexified pidgin which subsequently developed into a creole, known as Bonin English, Ogasawara Creole or Ogasawara Mixed Language, emerged on the islands during the 19th century. This was the result of Japanese being hybridized with island English, resulting in a mixed language that can still be heard.

The Ogasawara Village municipality operates public elementary and junior high schools, while Tokyo Metropolitan Government Board of Education operates Ogasawara High School. In the post–World War II era, Admiral Arthur Radford Elementary School (ラドフォード提督学校) (JA) taught elementary students and high school students went to Guam to do their high school education. Ogasawara High opened in 1964.

== Fictional references ==
The Bonins have been referenced in several works of fiction. Bonin by Robert Standish describes itself as 'a novel', but claims 'this book is an accurate history of the Bonin Islands', based mainly on information from Nathaniel Savory's great-granddaughter, and includes descriptions of maltreatment of Bonin Islanders (the Anglo-Polynesian population) by the later Japanese settlers and authorities and a detailed map of the Chichijima group (on the back end-paper), including over 50 English place-names.

Chapter XVI of Jack London's autobiographical novel John Barleycorn says, "This isolated group, belonging to Japan, had been selected as the rendezvous of the Canadian and American sealing fleets", and describes the drunken visit of a young sailor and his shipmates to the Bonin Islands.

In the television series The Super Dimension Fortress Macross, a fictional island in the chain, South Ataria Island (which would have laid at the southernmost position in the chain, surpassing Minami Iwo Jima), is the landing site of the SDF-1 Macross.

In the 1963 film Matango, a luxury yacht is set adrift and lands on an island. Upon approaching the island, one of the crew members shouts: "I wonder if it's the Bonin Islands?" The English subtitles for the film misspell Bonin "Bonan".

In the 2003 kaiju film Godzilla: Tokyo S.O.S., the twin Mothra larvae hatch from their egg in Himago Island and rush to help their mother who got attacked by Godzilla.

The 2017 anime film The Irregular at Magic High School: The Movie – The Girl Who Summons the Stars takes place on fictional islands in the Bonins.

In the 2023 kaiju film Godzilla Minus One, Koichi Shikishima and his minesweeper crew travel there and are tasked with stalling Godzilla's approach to Japan.

== Gallery ==
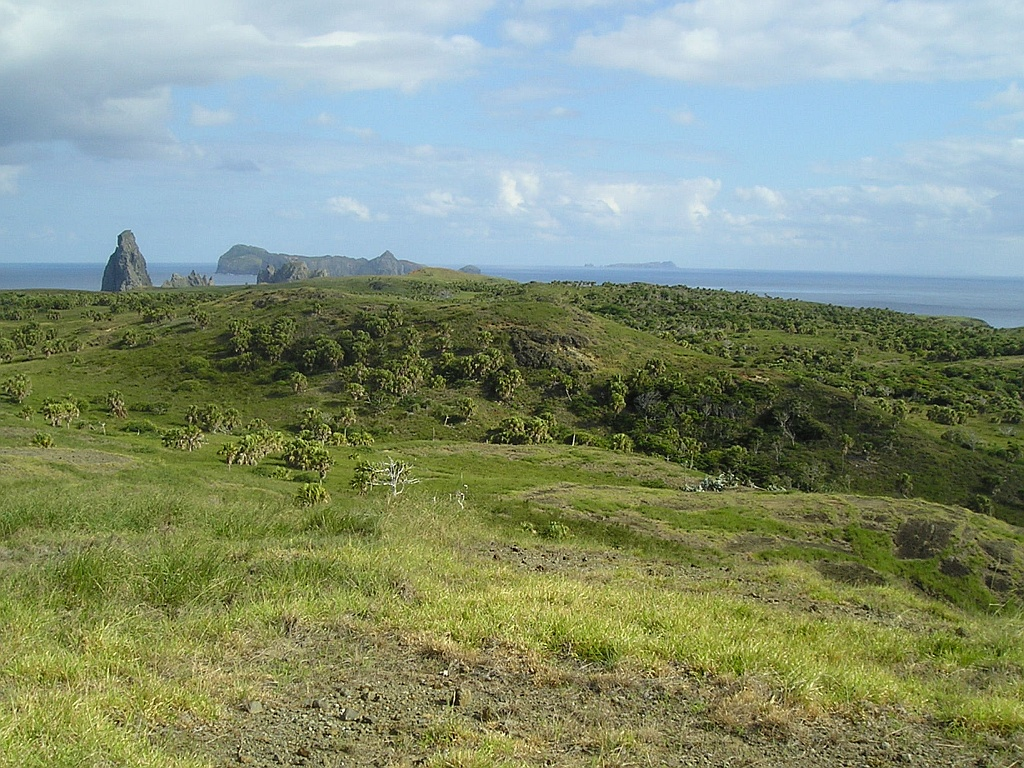
Muko-jima

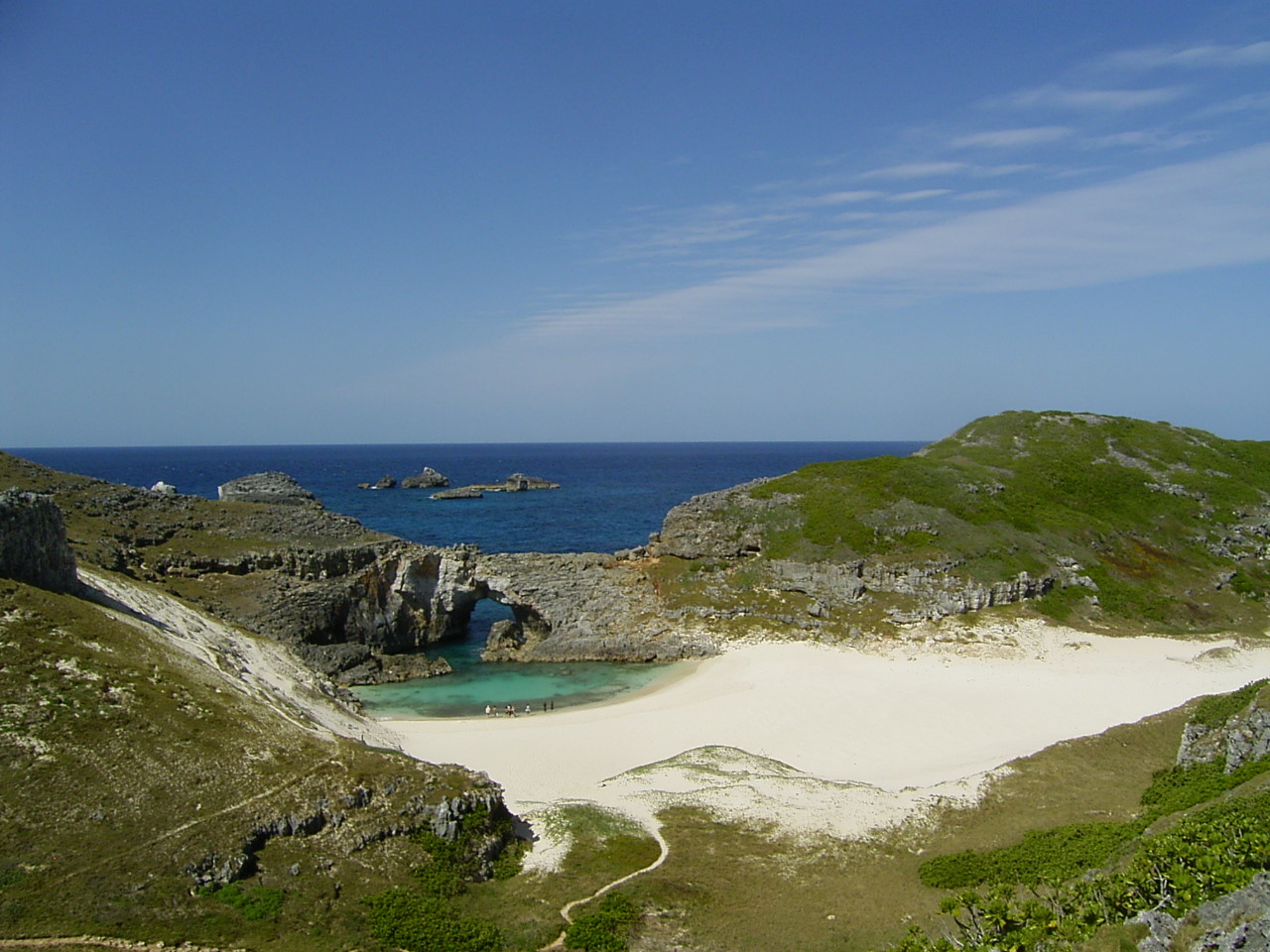
Minami-jima, a small island in the Chichi-jima group

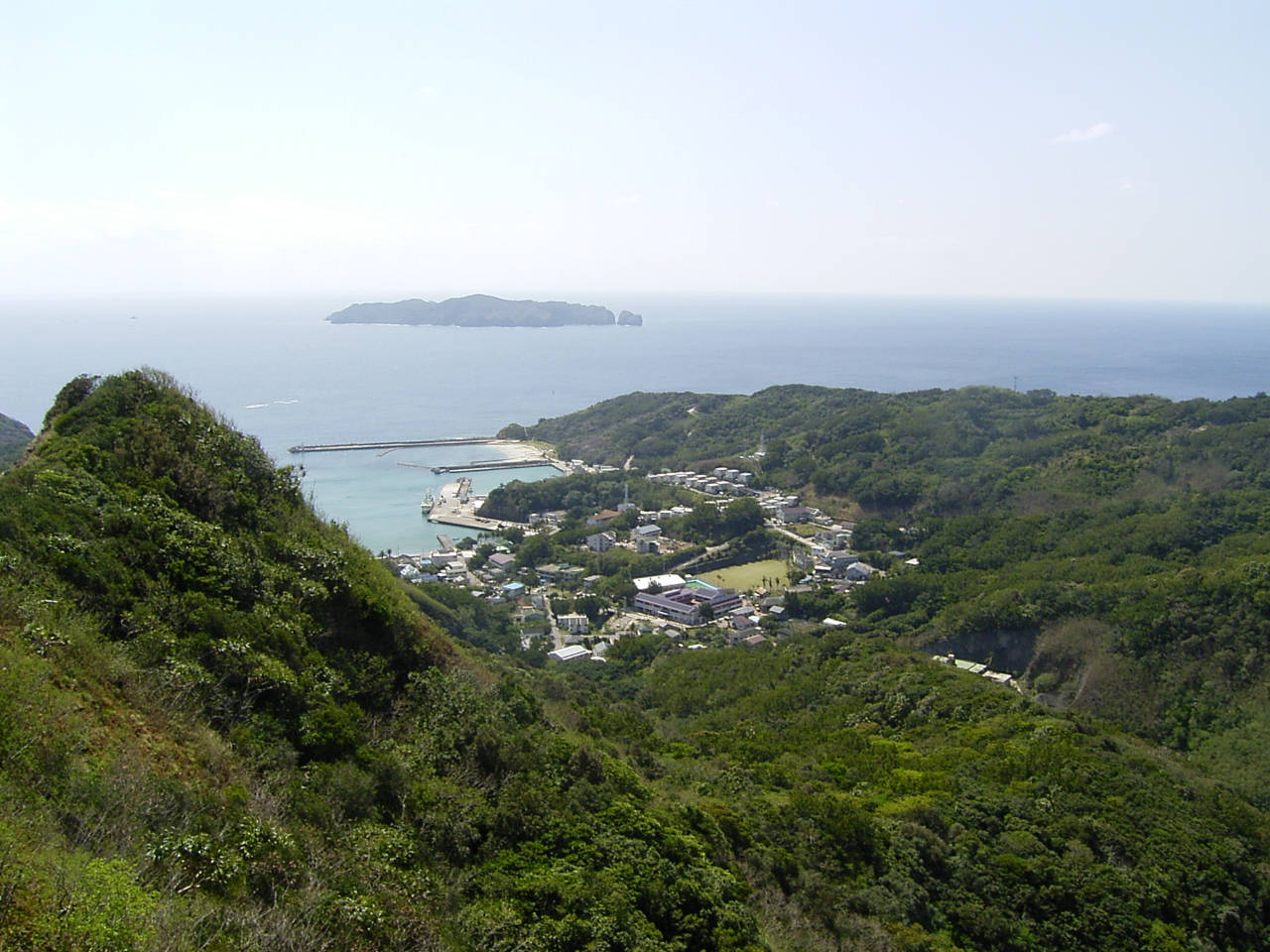
Haha-jima

== See also ==
- List of extreme points of Japan
- List of World Heritage Sites in Japan
- María de Lajara
