= Nathaniel Savory =

Leader of the Bonin Islanders

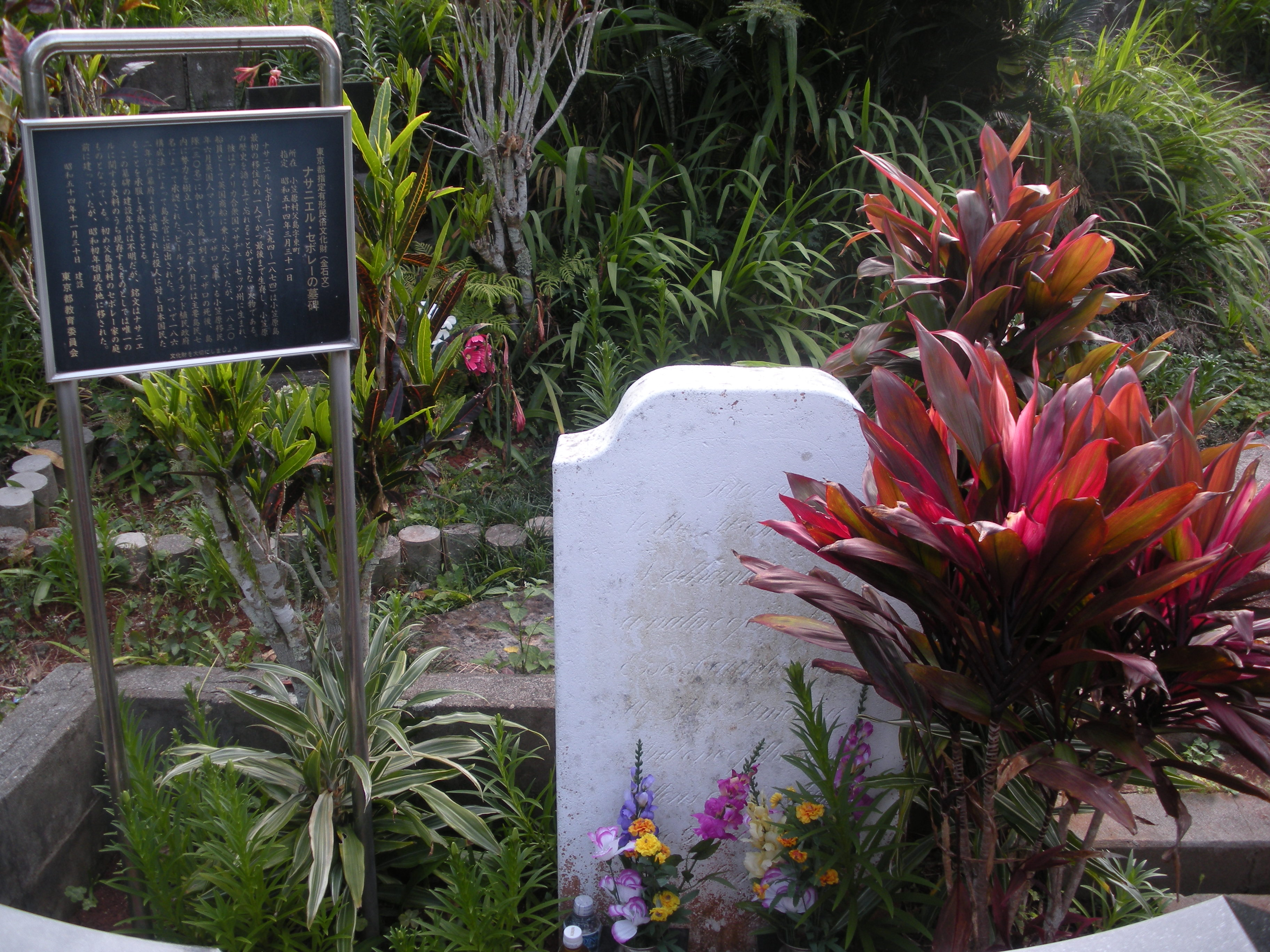
Nathaniel Savory's Grave on Chichi-jima Island

Nathaniel Savory (Japanese: 瀬堀 南山, Sebori Nanzan, July 31, 1794 – April 10, 1874) was one of the first American colonists who settled on the Bonin (Ogasawara) Islands. He eventually became governor, and played an active role in government before and during the colonization by Japan.

== Life ==
Nathaniel Savory was born in Bradford, Massachusetts on July 31, 1794. He had four brothers and two sisters. He became a sailor in 1814, and was at the port of Philadelphia in 1817. He eventually relocated to Hawaii; he was serving on an English merchant ship that visited Honolulu in 1829. In 1830 he headed out for an adventure expedition, led by the Italian-British Matteo Mazzaro, and accompanied by a small group of Americans, British, and Hawaiians who arrived at the Bonin Islands on 26 June. They all eventually settled in Ōgiura, Chichi-jima. Mazzaro became the Governor until his death in 1848.

In 1853, Admiral Matthew Perry made a stop at the island on the way to Japan. Perry established a colonial government plan, which included the election of Chief Magistrate and Council. Savory was elected Chief Magistrate for two years in 1854 and for three more years afterwards.

In December 1861, when Tadakuni Mizuno and others landed on the island, the Japanese began taking control. In 1862 the islands were claimed by Japan, but Savory was left in charge of the islanders. He died on April 10, 1874 and was succeeded by a Japanese governor. He had never left the Bonin Islands besides a single trip to Manila. He was survived by his wife and six children.

== In literature ==
Nathaniel Savory is a character in the 1943 novel Bonin by Robert Standish.

== See also ==
- Clinostigma savoryanum, a species of palm
