= Ogasawara, Tokyo =

Village in the Ogasawara Islands, Japan

Ogasawara 小笠原村
- Village
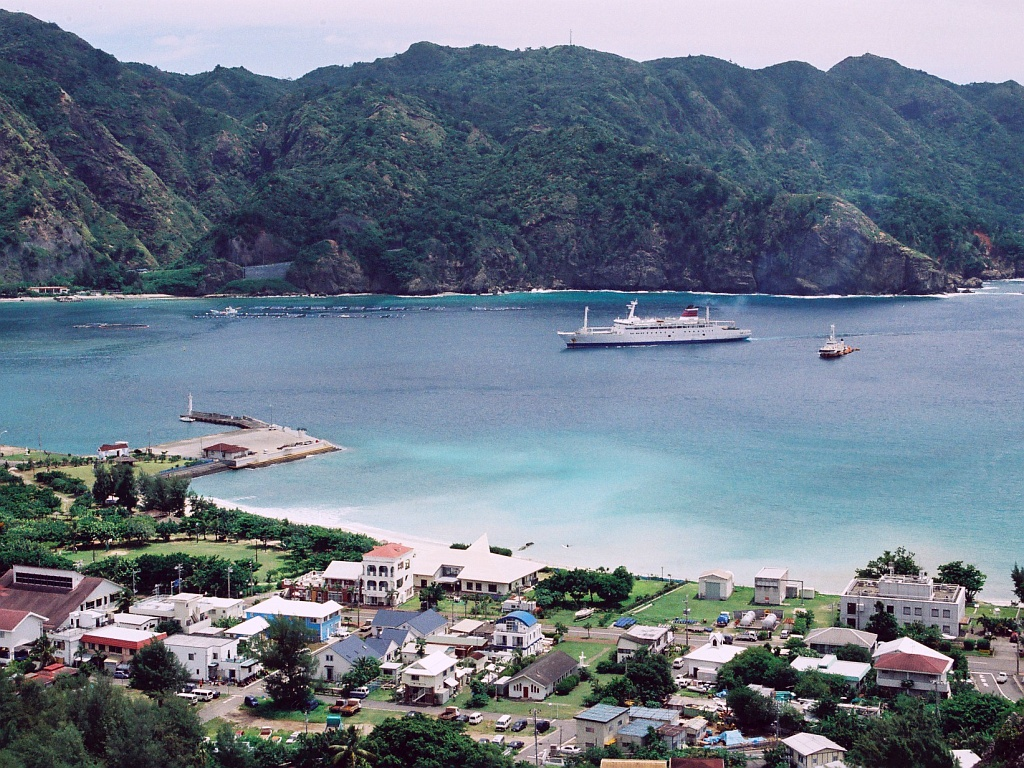
- Futami Port, Chichijima

- Flag Seal

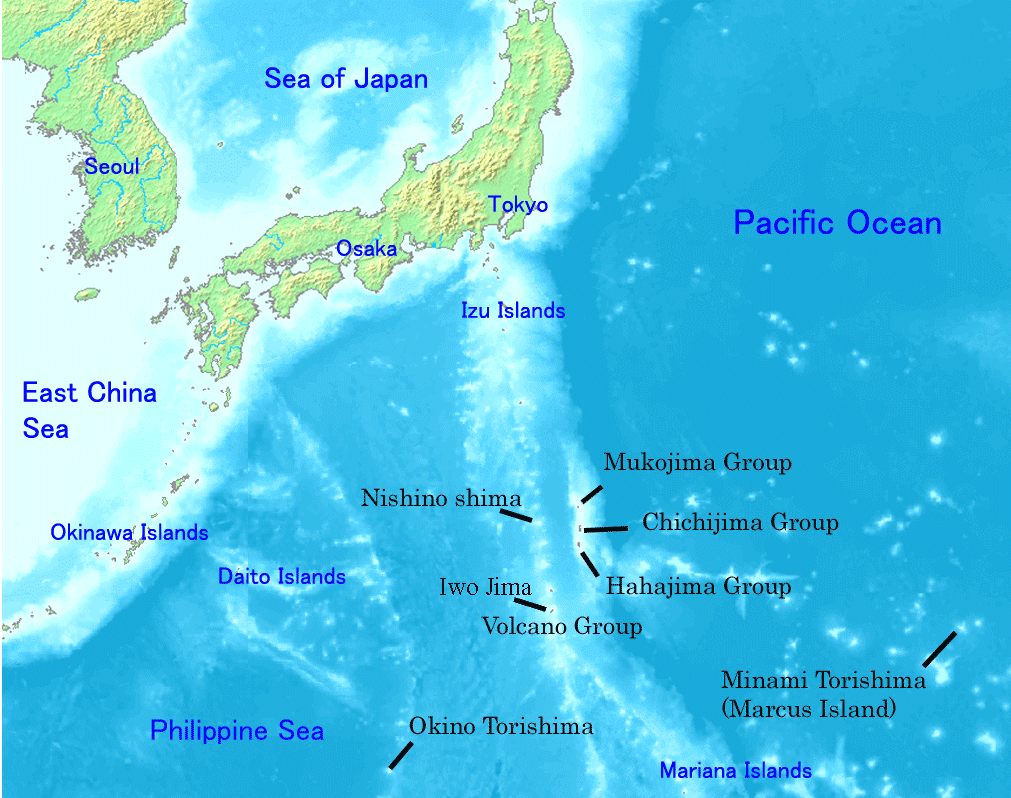
- Location of the islands of Ogasawara Village

- Location in the North Pacific Ogasawara (North Pacific ) Ogasawara (Asia)
- Coordinates: 27°5′40″N 142°11′31″E
- Country: Japan
- Region: Kantō
- Prefecture: Tokyo Metropolis

Government
  - Mayor: Masaaki Shibuya

Area
  - Total: 106.88 km^{2} (41.27 sq mi)

Population (23 August 2025)
  - Total: 2,459
  - Density: 27.4/km^{2} (71/sq mi)
- Time zone: UTC+09:00 (JST)
- City hall address: Nishimachi, Chichijima, Ogasawara-mura, Tōkyō-to; 100-2101
- Website: en.vill.ogasawara.tokyo.jp
- Symbols
- Bird: Bonin white-eye
- Flower: Munin Himetsubaki (Schima mertensiana)
- Tree: Screw pine

Ogasawara Village (小笠原村, Ogasawara-mura) is a village in Ogasawara Subprefecture, Tokyo Metropolis, Japan, that governs the Bonin Islands, Volcano Islands, and three remote islands (Nishinoshima, Minamitorishima and Okinotorishima).

== History ==
In 1940, five municipalities were created in the islands, which had been unincorporated before, two on Chichijima, two on Hahajima, and one on Iwojima:

- Ōmura (大村) on Chichijima
- Ōgimura-Fukurosawa (扇村袋沢村) on Chichijima
- Kitamura (北村) on Hahajima
- Okimura (沖村) on Hahajima
- Iōtō (硫黄島村) on Iwojima (Iōtō), which includes all of the Volcano Islands

Both villages of Kita Iwo Jima became part of the newly created Iwojima municipality in 1940:

- Ishinomura (east)
- Nishimura (west)

Following World War II, the islands were administered by the United States. The islands were returned to Japanese control in 1968 and organized as Ogasawara Village.

=== Airport plan ===
In August 2020, the Tokyo Metropolitan Government held a council about a potential airport. It would be operational in 10 years at the earliest. The mayor of Ogasawara Village, Kazuo Morishita said the airport was a long-standing wish of the village, and Governor Koike said at a regular press conference that day, that the new plan would be an effective measure to secure necessary air routes for the islanders.

== Village crest ==
The village crest or emblem, used as the seal and on the flag, depicts three Bonin white-eye birds – one parent and two young – in a circle "representing the sun, harmony and development" (「太陽と円満と発展を表現し」, "taiyō to enman to hatten o hyōgen shi"). They are grouped such that together they represent the kanji o (小), the first character of the native spelling of Ogasawara. These birds are regarded as a special natural monument (特別天然記念物), as the island is their only natural habitat.

== Geography ==
The municipality consists of the following groups and single isolated islands:

- Bonin Islands (小笠原群島, Ogasawara Guntō), 73 square kilometres (28 sq mi)
  - Mukōjima rettō (聟島列島), 6.57 square kilometres (2.54 sq mi)
  - Chichijima rettō (父島列島), 38.89 square kilometres (15.02 sq mi)
  - Hahajima rettō (母島列島), 27.54 square kilometres (10.63 sq mi)
- Volcano Islands (火山列島, Kazan-rettō) 29.71 square kilometres (11.47 sq mi)
  - Kita Iwojima (北硫黄島, Kita-Iōtō; lit. "North Sulphur Island") 5.57 square kilometres (2.15 sq mi)
  - Iwojima (硫黄島, Iōtō; lit. "Sulphur Island") 20.6 square kilometres (8.0 sq mi)
  - Minami Iwojima (南硫黄島, Minami-Iōtō; lit. "South Sulphur Island") 3.54 square kilometres (1.37 sq mi)
  - Nishinoshima (西之島, lit. "Western Island"; also known as Rosario Island), a single isolated island west of Hahajima rettō and part of the Volcano Islands, 0.29 square kilometres (0.11 sq mi)
- Okinotorishima (沖ノ鳥島 or 沖鳥島; lit. "Remote Bird Island") 0.01 square kilometres (0.0039 sq mi)
- Minamitorishima (南鳥島; lit. "Southern Bird Island"; also known as Marcus Island) 1.4 square kilometres (0.54 sq mi)

The southernmost (uninhabited) group is known as the Volcano Islands. 700 kilometres (430 mi) further south is Okinotorishima, and 1,900 kilometres (1,200 mi) further east is Minamitorishima.

The administration and village hall is located in the village of Omura on Chichijima. In addition, there is an air base with 400 soldiers on Iwojima of the Volcano Islands.

== Demographics ==
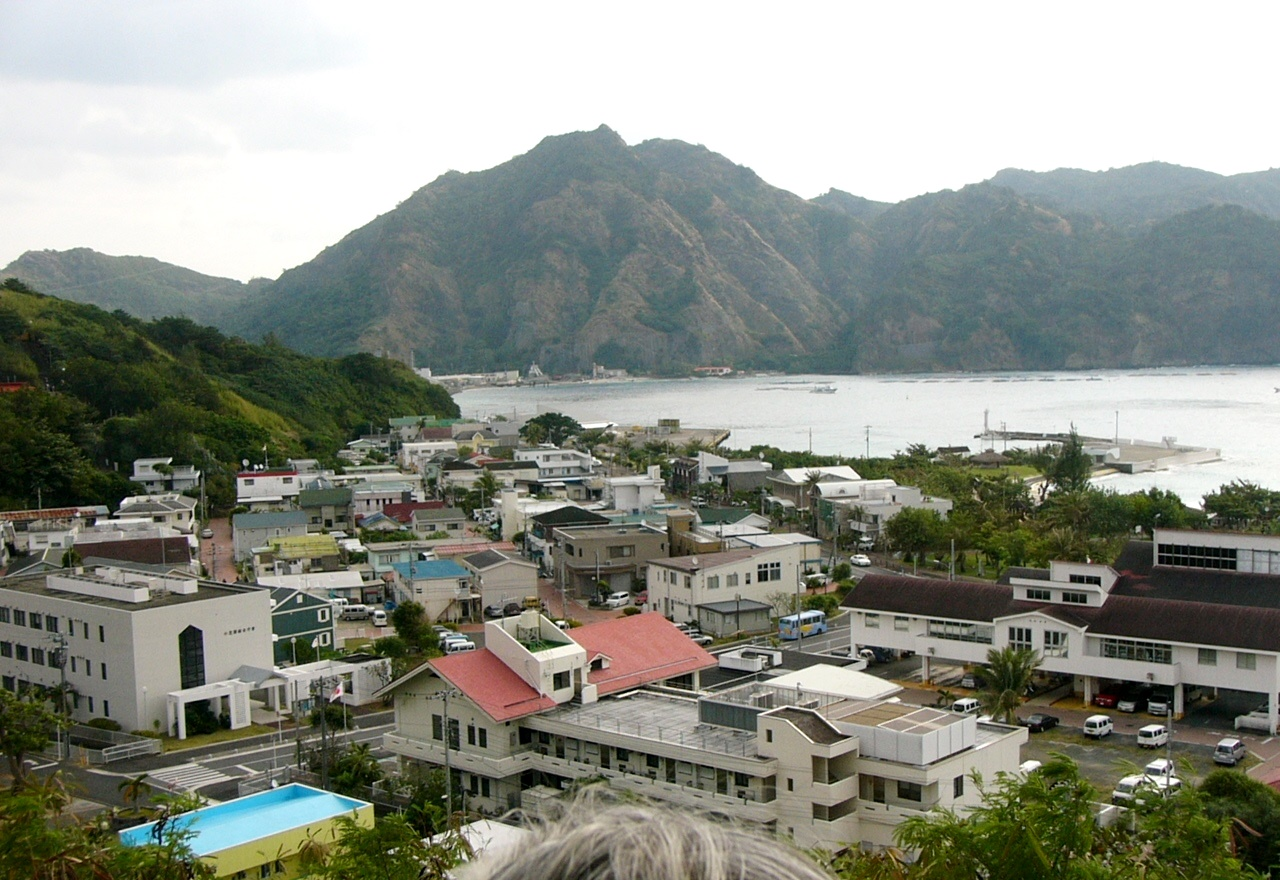
The main settlement on Chichijima

The following table of historical population displays data from Japanese censuses. Overall population change 2015–2020 was -0.62%.

Historical population
Year	Pop.	±%
1980	1,879	—
1990	2,361	+25.7%
2000	2,824	+19.6%
2010	2,785	−1.4%
2020	2,929	+5.2%

As of 23 August 2025, according to data published on the official website of Ogasawara, there were 1,479 total households, with a total population of 2,459 – 2,040 in Chichijima and 419 in Hahajima.

== Education ==
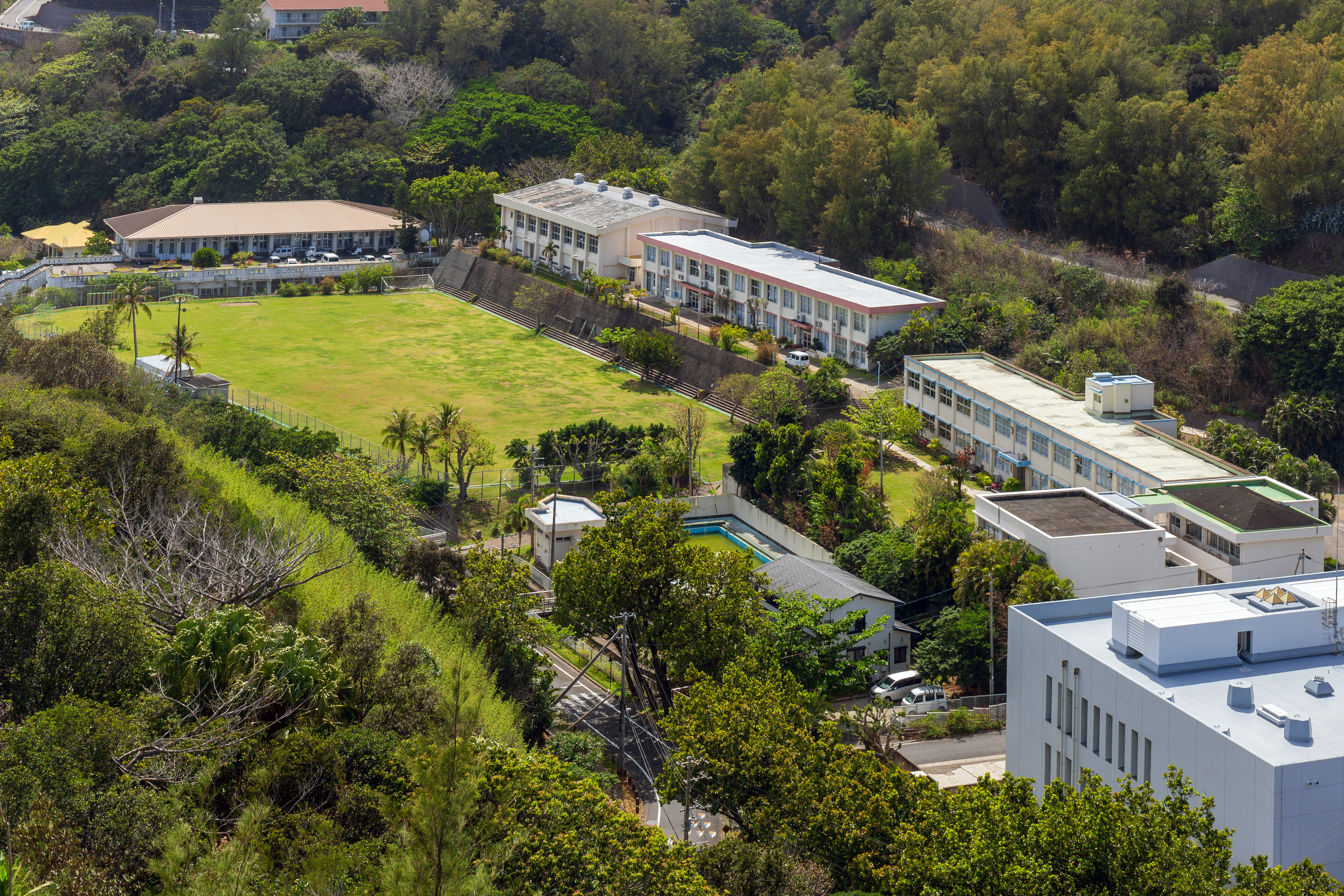
Ogasawara Elementary and Junior High School

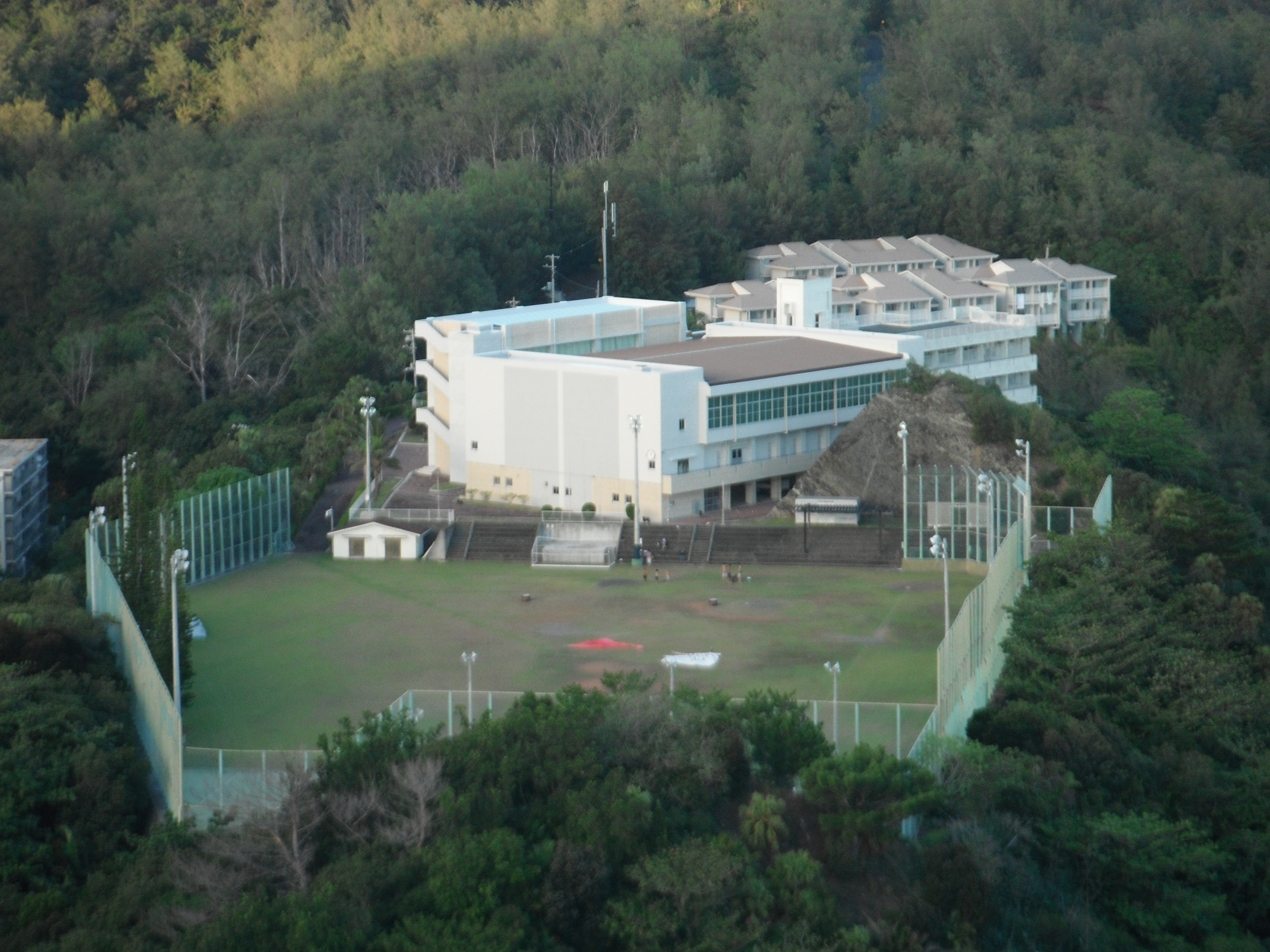
Ogasawara High School

Ogasawara Village operates the islands' public elementary and junior high schools; there are three such schools:

- Ogasawara Village Municipal Ogasawara Elementary School (小笠原村立小笠原小学校) in Chichijima
- Ogasawara Village Municipal Ogasawara Junior High School (小笠原村立小笠原中学校) in Chichijima
- Ogasawara Village Municipal Hahajima Elementary School and Junior High School (小笠原村立母島小中学校) on Hahajima

The Tokyo Metropolitan Government Board of Education operates Tokyo Metropolitan Ogasawara High School (東京都立小笠原高等学校) on Chichijima. Prior to the school's opening on April 24, 1964 (Showa era 44), high school students went to the American territory of Guam for their education.

== Gallery ==
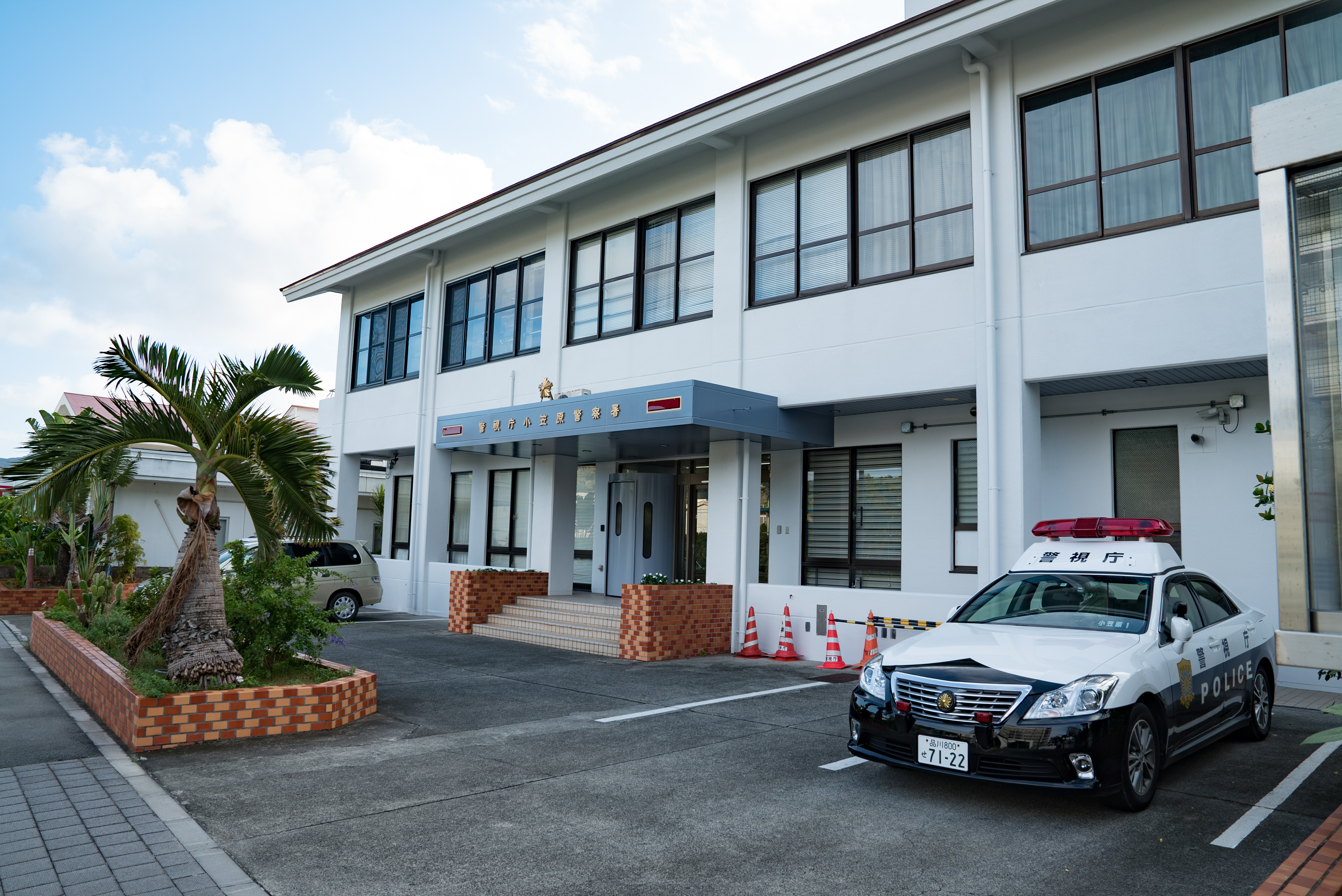
Ogasawara Police Station, Tokyo Metropolitan Police Department
