= Tony László =

American journalist

- Born: 16 October 1960 (age 66); United States
- Spouse: Saori Oguri

Tony László (born 16 October 1960) is an American born to parents of Hungarian and Italian descent. He was raised in the United States and came to Japan in 1985. As a freelance journalist, he has written articles in English and Japanese.

He has been a representative and webmaster for the non-governmental organization Issho Kikaku since 1994.

He is married to manga artist Saori Oguri and appears as a leading character in some of her works, mainly the My Darling is a Foreigner (Darling wa Gaikokujin) series.

His own writings include the book Tony ryū shiawase o saibai suru hōhō (トニー流 幸せを栽培する方法), which his wife illustrated.
