= 109th Division (Imperial Japanese Army) =

109th Infantry Division
- Active: 1937–1945
- Country: Empire of Japan
- Branch: Imperial Japanese Army
- Type: Infantry
- Role: Garrison
- Size: 21,000
- Garrison/HQ: Kanazawa, Kōfu
- Nickname: Courage division
- Engagements: Second Sino-Japanese War; Pacific War: Battle of Iwo Jima

Commanders
- Notable commanders: Korechika Anami; Tadamichi Kuribayashi; Yoshio Tachibana

The 109th Infantry Division (第109師団, Dai-hyakukyū Shidan) was an infantry division of the Imperial Japanese Army (IJA) that specialized in banzai charge, combined arms, counterattack, defensive fighting position, jungle warfare, maneuver warfare, and military engineering for coastal defence and fortification.

Its call sign was the Courage Division (膽兵団, Tan Heidan). It was formed on 24 August 1937 in Kanazawa as a square division, simultaneously with the 108th Infantry Division. The nucleus for the formation was the 9th Infantry Division headquarters. It was subordinated from the beginning to the Japanese Northern China Area Army.

== First formation ==
The 109th Infantry Division was sent to North China in October 1937. It closely cooperated with the 108th division, contributing to the Beiping–Hankou Railway Operation and the capture of the Linfen city. Later it also provided a garrison for the Shanxi province. The division was eventually dissolved 24 December 1939. From the start of the Second Sino-Japanese War until its return to Japan in November 1939, the 109th Division suffered 944 killed, 2,363 wounded, 289 dead from illnesses, and 50,600 fallen ill.

== Second formation ==
The 109th Infantry Division was reformed in May 1944 from the 1st Independent Mixed Brigade and other Bonin Islands garrisons reinforced by recruits from the Kōfu mobilization district. The 109th Infantry Division was assigned to the 31st Army, under Commanding Lieutenant General Hideyoshi Obata. It comprised the bulk of the Japanese garrison on the volcanic islands of Iwo Jima and Chichi Jima which were wiped out by American forces from February to March 1945 in Battle of Iwo Jima.

The structure of the 109th was different than most divisions in the IJA. After 1936, the normal make up of a division was the triangular organization, with three infantry regiments to a division. The 109th (along with the 91st Infantry Division) were considered square divisions because they had two infantry brigades (5000 men each) with two infantry regiments each. During the buildup prior to the attack of Iwo-jima General Kuribayashi divided the 109th and each was built up to maximum strengths. The 109th, as the Ogasawara island Detachment was the Ogasawara (Bonin Islands) District Group, also called the Ogasawara Army Group, with an approximate strength of 47,000 troops.

=== 1st Brigade ===
The 1st Independent Mixed Brigade, led by Major General Tachibana, and the 17th Independent Mixed Regiment, as well as other elements, were stationed on Chichi Jima (Father Island) with approximately 25,000 troops. Many were deployed to other island defenses such as the rest of the middle cluster known as Father Island (groups); Ani-jima, Ototo-jima, Mago-jima, along with islets Higashi-jima, Nishi-jima, and Minami-jima. The northernmost cluster or Groom Islands (group) included; Yome-jima, Muko-jima, and Nakōdo-jima or Nakadachi-jima. The southernmost cluster known as the Mother Island (group) of Haha-jima, Ane-jima, Imōto-jima, Mei-jima, along with the smaller Hira-shima and Muko-jima. These groups of islands were by-passed when Iwo-jima was chosen to be attacked but were subjected to bombing and naval shelling by the U.S. military.

=== 2nd Brigade ===
The 2nd Independent Mixed Brigade, led by Major General Kotau Osuga, and the Third Battalion of the 17th Regiment, led by Major Tomachi Fujiwara, was on Iwo Jima with Kuribayashi. The 2700 man 145th infantry regiment under Colonel Masuo Ikeda, a part of 46th division, was diverted from Saipan to Iwo Jima and Rear Admiral Toshinosuke Ichimaru that arrived with 2300 navy personnel.

Many of the 109th's personnel had previously served in China, Burma and the Dutch East Indies and had become reservists who were now reluctant to go back to battle. To bolster morale the Japanese Emperor Hirohito sent his own palace guard of anti-aircraft gunners to Chichi Jima to support the troops—as it was expected the main force of Americans would strike there, however the Allied Joint Chiefs of Staff decided to bypass Chichi Jima altogether.

=== Preparations ===
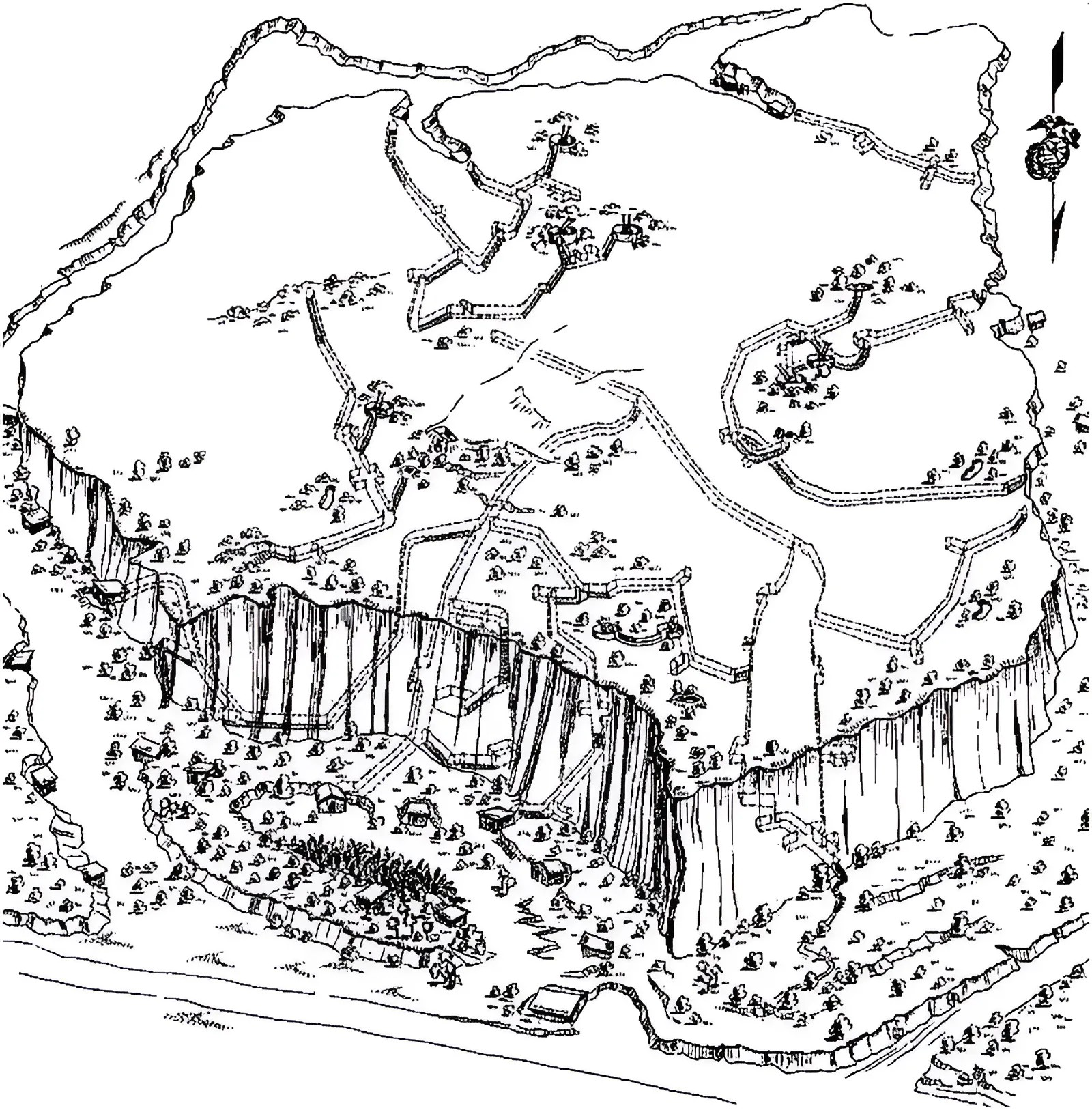
A U.S. map of tunnel defences around Iwo Jima built by the 109th

With preparations underway Kuribayashi worked with the tactic of defense-in-depth building numerous pillboxes for machine-gunners and 13,000 yards of tunnels with even a field-hospital worked in. However he had issues with many officers—dismissing 18 of them along with his Chief-of-staff, Kuribayashi also lost control of the Naval troops who dug in on the beaches.

=== The battle begins ===
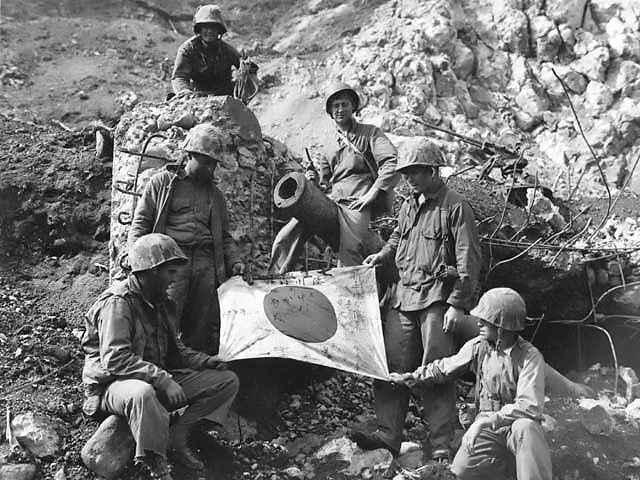
American troops capture a Japanese flag

On 19 February 1945 the battle began, but quickly came the feeling that the 109th were doomed as air or naval relief would not be able to help. Kuribayashi ordered his troops to inflict maximum damage and casualties on the enemy and to "kill 10 men before dying".

For 33 days the 109th fought on Iwo Jima, facing against tanks and heavy bombardments from the sea and air. In the end only 1083 Japanese survived, with a mere 216 captured from the 109th's 21,000 men during the battle, the other 867 Japanese soldiers came from other units. As for Kuribayashi, it is generally thought that he committed suicide by leading the last major counterattack. The rest held out hungry and alone in Iwo Jima's tunnels until the U.S. soldiers used explosives to clear the tunnels weeks later.

==== Elements of the 109th ====
The 109th Infantry Division comprised the 1st and 2nd Mixed Brigade. The 3rd Battalion of the 17th Independent Mixed Regiment was on Iwo Jima and there were many attached units

===== Headquarters Group =====
The 109th Chief of staff (detached to Chichi jima); Colonel Hori, was replaced with Colonel Tadashi Takaishi

- Communications
- Anti-Aircraft, Major Shotaro Azuma
- Headquarters Guard
- Storm Company
- Rocket Gun, Group B
- Water Works
- Ammunition Depot
- Independent Trench Mortar 1st Company
- Field Hospital (109th Infantry Division)

===== 145th Regiment =====
Commanding officer; Colonel Masuo Ikeda, approx. 2,700 men

- First Battalion; Major mitsuaki Hara
- Second Battalion; Major Yasutake
- Third Battalion; Major Kenro Anso
- Artillery Battalion; Captain Matsuda
- Engineer Battalion; Captain Kikuzo Musashino
- Field Hospital

145th Infantry Regiment, Captain Masuda

- Second Middle Mortar Battalion; Major Jusuke Nadao
- Third Middle Mortar Battalion; Major Koichiro Kobayashi

===== Third Battalion =====
Third Battalion, 17th Independent Mixed Regiment; Major Tomachi Fujiwara

===== 26th Tank Regiment =====
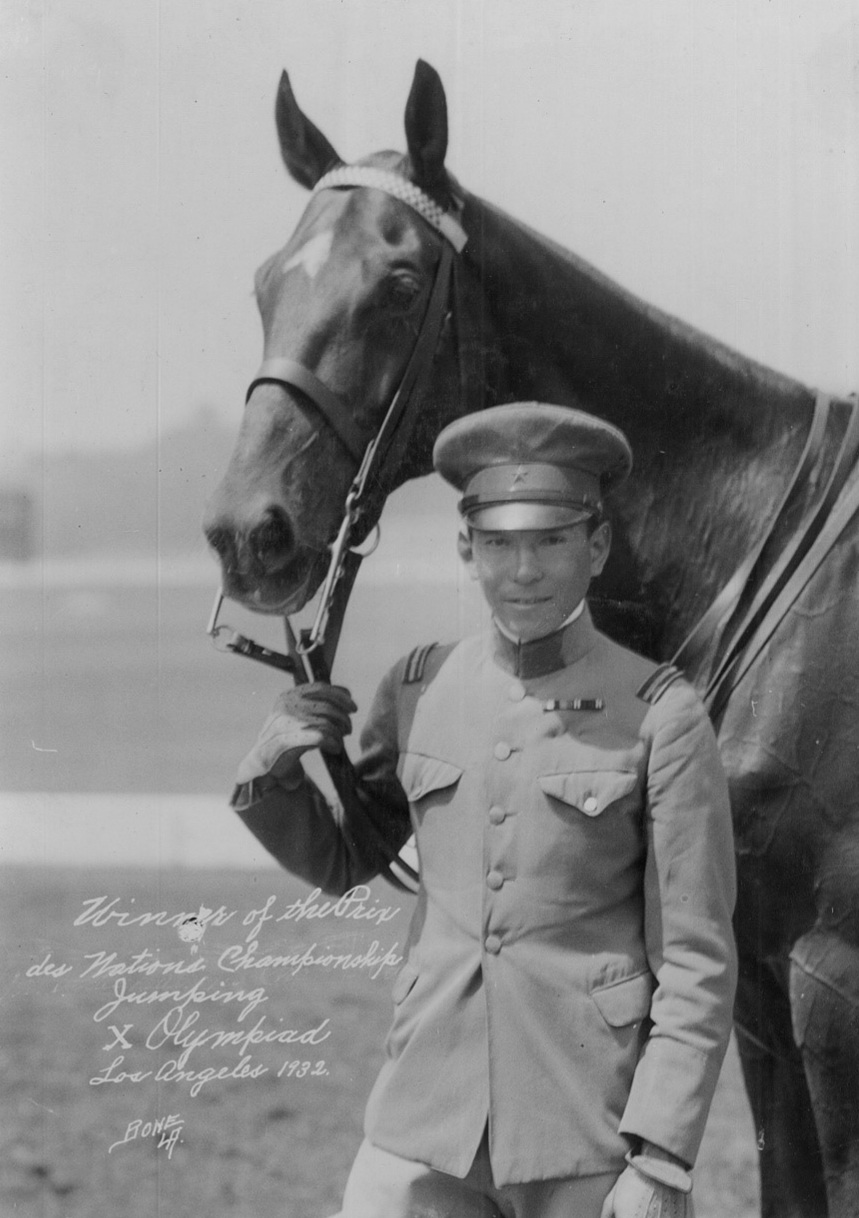
Nishi with Olympic steed, Uranus

Commanding officer; Lieutenant Colonel (Baron) Takeichi Nishi, 600 men and what started as 19 tanks. Many of the tanks were disassembled and the turrets concealed so they could be used with less threat of being destroyed by bombardment.

===== 2nd Mixed Brigade =====
Commanding officer; General Osuga was replaced with Major General Sadasue Senda, approx. 5200 men

- 309th Independent Infantry Battalion; Captain Awatsu
- 310th Independent Infantry Battalion; Major Iwatani
- 311th Independent Infantry Battalion; Major Tatsumi
- 312th Independent Infantry Battalion; Captain Osada
- 314th Independent Infantry Battalion; Captain Hakuda
- Artillery Battalion, Major Kazuo Maeda
- Combat Engineer Battalion, Major Maekawa
- Field Hospital, Major Masaru Inaok

Brigade Artillery Group, Colonel Chosaku Kaido

- Second Mixed Brigade artillery unit; Major Kazuo Maeda
- 20th Independent Artillery Mortar Battalion; Captain Mitsuo Mizutari
- 8th Independent Anti-Tank Battalion; Captain Hajime Shimizu
- 9th Independent Anti-Tank Battalion; Major Okubo
- 10th Independent Anti-Tank Battalion; Major Matsushita
- 11th Independent Anti-Tank Battalion; Captain Node
- 12th Independent Anti-Tank Battalion; Captain Masao Hayauchi
- 1st Independent Machine Gun Battalion; Captain Ko Kawanami
- 2nd Independent Machine Gun Battalion; Major Tokio Kawasaki

===== Navy =====
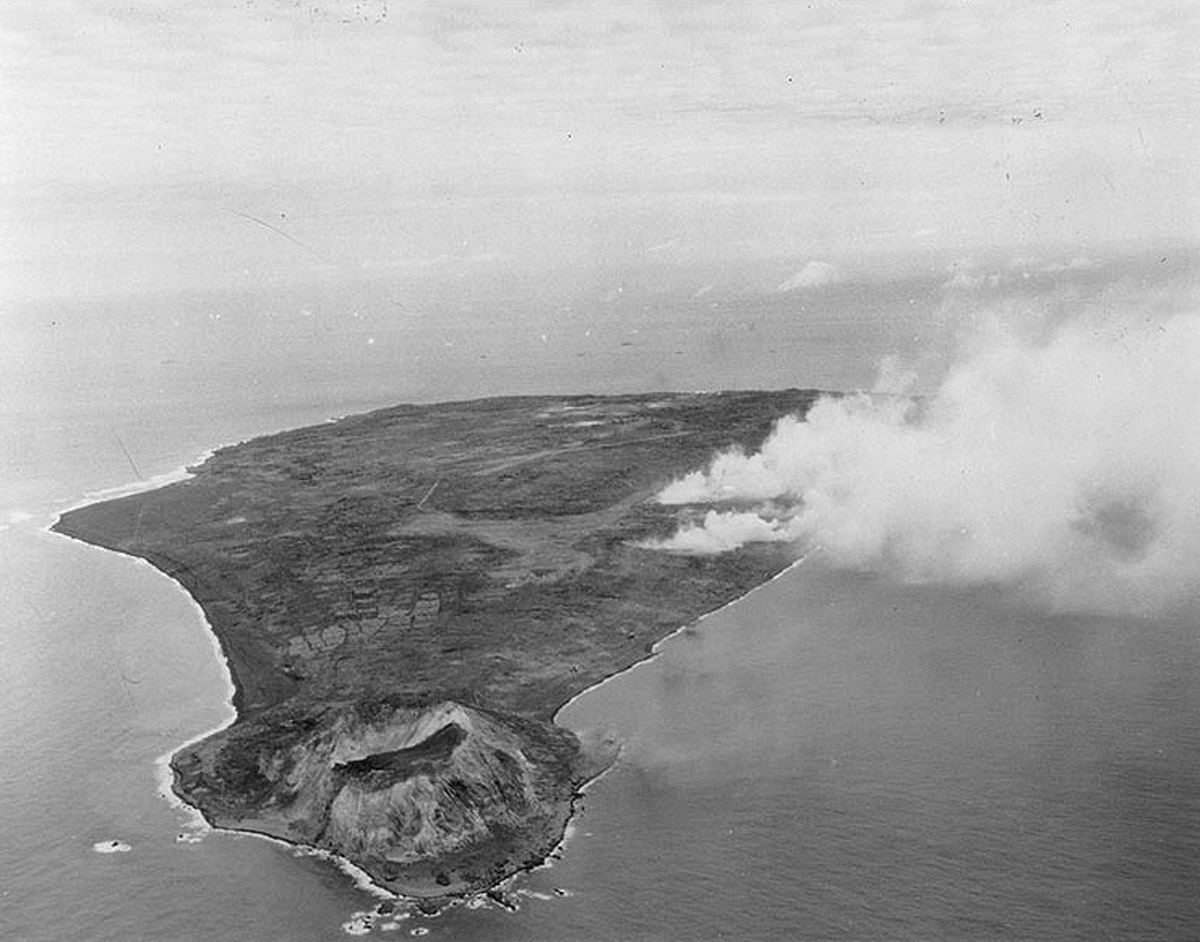
The volcanic island of Iwo Jima being bombarded before its invasion

- Imperial Japanese Navy (IJN); Rear Admiral Rinosuke Ichimaru, arrived with 2,216 naval personnel

Naval Guard Force, Captain Samaji Inoue

- 20th Special Machine Cannon Unit; 2nd Lieutenant Momozaki, attached to IJN Guard Force
- 21st Special Machine Cannon Unit; 2nd Lieutenant Isamu Kondo, attached to IJN Guard Force
- 43rd Special Machine Cannon Unit; 1st Lieutenant Tamara, attached to IJN Guard Force
- 44th Special Machine Cannon Unit; unknown, attached to IJN Guard Force
- Operations, Commander Takeji Mase
- Communications, Lieutenant Commander Shigeru Arioka
- Combat Engineering, Lieutenant Commander Narimasa Okada
- Supply, Lieutenant Commander Okazaki
- Suribachi Commander, Captain Kanehiko Atsuchi
- 125th Anti-Aircraft Defense Unit, Lieutenant (j.g.) Tamura
- 132nd Anti-Aircraft Defense Unit, Ensign Okumura
- 141st Anti-Aircraft Defense Unit, Lieutenant (j.g.) Doi
- 204th Naval Construction Battalion, Lieutenant Fujiro Iida, 1,233 men

===== Other units =====
- Rocket Gun Company; Captain Yoshio Yokoyama
- Fifth Fortress Engineer Company; unknown
- 21st Well Drilling Team; unknown
- Iwo Freight Depot Team; unknown
- Combat Engineer unit, mixed 1st brigade; unknown

The exact strength of Navy personnel is subject to question. With an estimate of approximately 21,000 troops it was reported that the IJA had 17,500 troops and the IJN had 5,500 troops and another report 13,586 IJA and 7,347 IJN troops.

== Knowledgeable predictions ==
During a dinner with Major Yoshitaka Horie (in charge of 109th Infantry Division's Detached Headquarters on Chichi Jima) Kuribayashi asked Horie his opinion for defending Iwo Jima, to which Horie replied it was vulnerable as "a pile of eggs" and better to sink it to the bottom of the ocean with enough explosives. Kuribayashi—who had spent much time in Canada as deputy military attaché and traveled often in America—was in agreement, however they knew that at 628 miles (1,011 km) from Tokyo, Iwo Jima would be "a dagger aimed straight at the heart of the homeland". Before leaving Japan to take up his post, Kuribayashi had informed his wife not to expect him home.

== See also ==
- List of Japanese Infantry Divisions
- Independent Mixed Brigades (Imperial Japanese Army)
