= 1st Independent Mixed Brigade =

The 1st Independent Mixed Brigade or 1st Mixed Brigade (獨立混成第1旅團) was an experimental combined arms formation of the Imperial Japanese Army. In July 1937, at the beginning of the Second Sino-Japanese War, the brigade was known as the Sakai Brigade, for its commander, Lt. General Koji Sakai. The brigade participated in Battle of Taiyuan in late 1937. After being promoted lieutenant general Masaomi Yasuoka took command from 1938 to 1939.

The tank component, all but the 4th Tank Battalion, was pulled from the brigade in 1938. Major General Suzuki Teiji assumed command in 1941. By 1944 defense of the Japanese homeland prompted the creation of the inner line of defense extending northward from the Carolines, the Marianas, and the Ogasawara Islands. The brigade was assigned to the 31st Army under General Hideyoshi Obata. There the 1st Mixed Brigade and the 2nd Mixed Brigade became part of the 109th Division, commanded by General Tadamichi Kuribayashi. The 1st Mixed Brigade was stationed on Chichi-jima with the division headquarters and the 2nd Brigade was moved to Iwo jima overseen by Kuribayashi.

The brigade consisted of the following units:

- 1st Independent Infantry Regiment
- 4th Tank Battalion
  - 12 Type 89 medium tanks
  - 13 Type 95 light tanks
  - 12 Type 94 tankettes
  - 4 armored engineer vehicles
- 1st Independent Artillery Battalion
- 1st Independent Engineer Company

== See also ==
- Independent Mixed Brigades (Imperial Japanese Army)
