= Nobuaki Iwatake =

American drafted into the Imperial Japanese Army during World War II

Nobuaki "Warren" Iwatake (岩竹信明. 1923–2012) was an American citizen who was drafted by the Imperial Japanese Army to serve as a radio operator and communications intercepter.

== Family history ==
Born in Kahului, Hawaii, Iwatake was the eldest son of six children and was raised in Kahului. His father, a Kobayashi store employee, presumed drowned from a fishing trip at Peahi. With the loss of the family breadwinner, his mother, four brothers, and one sister moved to Hiroshima, Japan, to live with an uncle in November, 1940. Warren stayed on Maui to graduate from Maui High School 1941. Six months before Pearl Harbor, he left to rejoin his family in Japan.

== Service in Imperial Japanese Army ==
Iwatake was drafted into the Imperial Japanese Army from a Japanese college in 1943. Iwatake missed the Battle of Iwo Jima due to a submarine attack on his ship's convoy, and was subsequently stationed on Chichi-jima, 150 miles north of Iwo Jima. American forces bombed Chichi-jima to cut radio communications between the islands. He was present when former United States President George H. W. Bush was shot down over the Pacific in his Avenger bomber, in September 1944, and was later rescued by a submarine. Two American crewman with Bush were killed. Bush's task was to bomb the island's communication towers, and any Imperial Japanese forces. Due to the "island hopping" strategy by American forces, the island was spared an invasion.

Iwatake was also present when Japanese Imperial forces captured an American pilot from Texas by the name of Warren Earl Vaughn. Mr. Iwatake was assigned to guard and work with Warren Earl Vaughn on Chichi Jima. Iwatake and Warren Earl spent many hours talking and developed a personal relationship.

According to Iwatake, one evening after a bath, the two were walking back when Iwatake fell into a bomb pit. "It was pitch black and I couldn't get out. He reached to me and said take his hand," and Warren Earl pulled Iwatake out. Shortly after the fall of Iwo Jima in March 1945, the pilot was taken away by other Japanese naval officers and beheaded. Iwatake adopted and kept the name "Warren" in honor and remembrance of his American friend. The story of Warren Earl Vaughn, Iwatake's observation of the rescue of George H.W. Bush, and the experiences of other Americans on the island is recounted in the book Flyboys: A True Story of Courage by James Bradley. Warren Iwatake and President George H.W. Bush met on Chichi Jima in 2002 in a symbolic reunion of veterans from both sides of the conflict.

Iwatake's youngest brother died in the Hiroshima atomic bomb attack, while attending a school about 500 yards from ground zero. Iwatake's uncle, Dr. Hiroshi Iwatake, was badly burned in the atomic explosion, but regained his health and lived into the 1980s. Hiroshi Iwatake's story is recounted in the 1966 (1969 Kodansha English translation by John Bester) historical novel Black Rain by Masuji Ibuse. Though centered around fictional characters, the novel is based on interviews with actual atom bomb survivors, including Hiroshi Iwatake.

After the war, Iwatake served as a translator for the American embassy in Tokyo for 35 years. He died in 2012 at the age of 88.
