= Takeshi Takashina =

Japanese general (1891–1944)

- 高品 彪
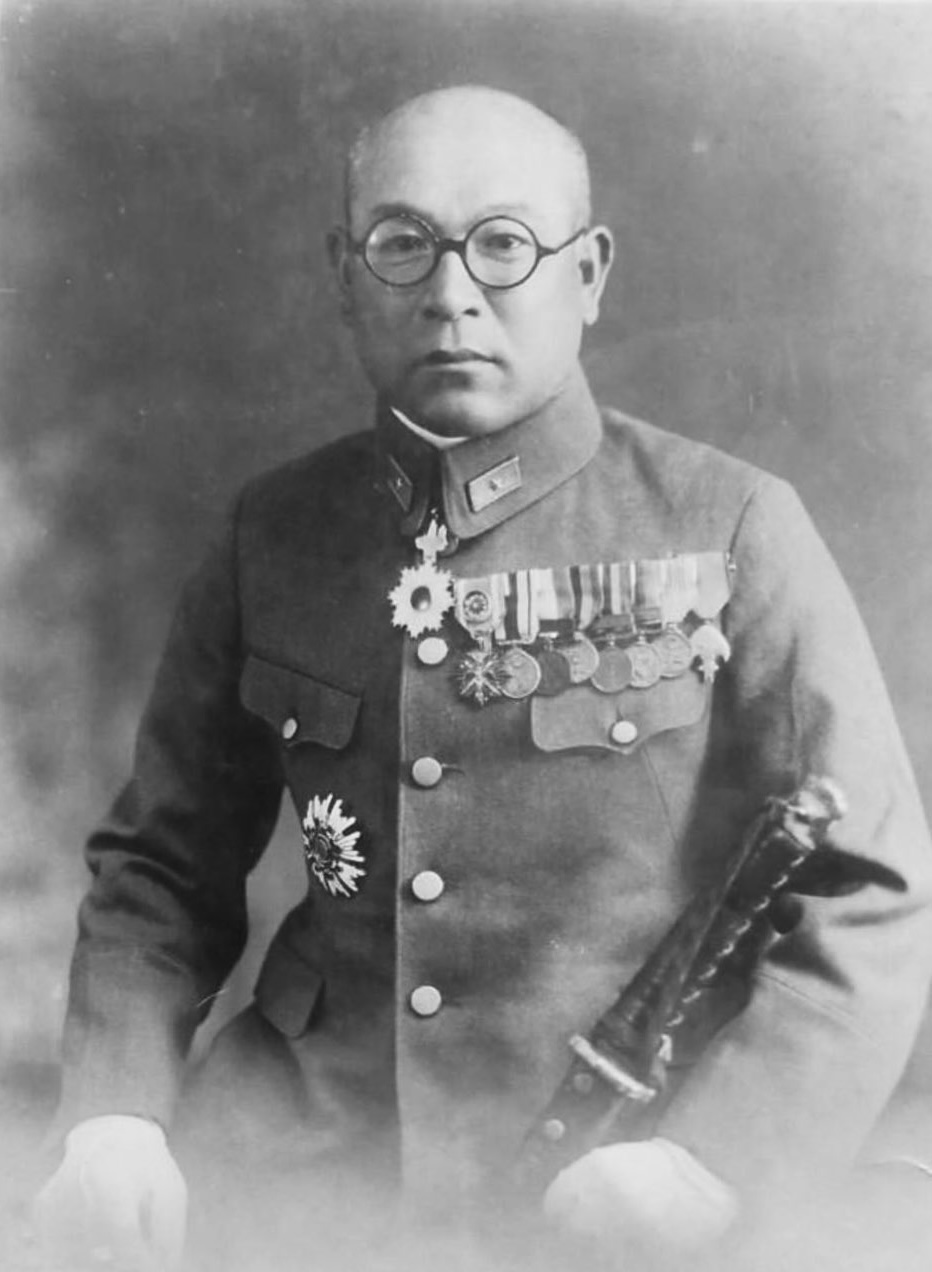
- Born: 25 January 1891; Chiba Prefecture, Japan
- Died: 28 July 1944 (aged 53); Guam
- Military career
- Allegiance: Empire of Japan
- Branch: Imperial Japanese Army
- Service years: 1913–1944
- Rank: Lieutenant General
- Commands: 29th Division
- Conflicts: World War I; World War II; Battle of Guam †

Takeshi Takashina (高品 彪, Takashina Takeshi; 25 January 1891 – 28 July 1944) was an Imperial Japanese Army general during World War II. He was killed in action during the Battle of Guam.

== Biography ==
=== Early military service ===
Takashina was born in Chiba Prefecture and was a graduate of the 25th class of the Imperial Japanese Army Academy in December 1913. He initially served with the IJA 66th Infantry Regiment. In November 1922, he graduated from the 34th class of the Army Staff College. During his early career, he served at the Keelung Fortress in Taiwan, as a battalion commander with the IJA 50th Infantry Regiment, and from August 1933 to August 1934 as instructor at the Army Engineering College. From 1934 to 1935, he was attached to the 4th Guards Regiment, and from 1935 to 1936 was on the staff of the 16th Depot Division in Kyoto. From March 1936 to August 1937, Takashina was attached to the IJA 3rd Infantry Regiment. After his promotion to colonel in August 1937, was made commandant of Takao Fortress in Taiwan.

In July 1938, Takashina became commanding officer of the IJA 60th Infantry Regiment and was promoted to major general in March 1940. He was then assigned command the IJA 27th Infantry Brigade. From September 1940 to September 1942, he was the commanding officer of the infantry group of the IJA 14th Division. From September 1941, this division was stationed at the Mongolian border at Handagai (south-east of Nomonhan). He was reassigned to command the IJA 17th Independent Mixed Brigade from September 1942 to October 1943. In October 1943, he was promoted to lieutenant general. Takashina was then assigned command of the IJA 29th division which was tasked with the defense of the Liaoyang area in Manchukuo, as part of the strategic reserve under direct control of the Kwantung Army.

=== Battle of Guam ===
In early March 1944, the IJA 29th division was taken out of reserve and reassigned to the IJA 31st Army. The bulk of division, comprising 18th and 38th infantry regiments, was sent to Guam island together with 48th Independent Mixed Brigade. Smaller detachments were sent to Tinian and Rota islands. Takashina was overall commander of Guam's defenses from early 1944 onward. Guam had approximately 18,000 Japanese soldiers and marines. On 21 July, Guam was invaded by Allied forces. Two days after the United States 3rd Marine Division landed on Guam, 25 July, Takashina planned a counterattack to push the Americans back into the sea. His strategy was to gather up every available Japanese unit on the island and to make one huge offensive to flush the Americans out of their beachhead positions back into the sea. After unsuccessful attacks on the Japanese positions at Fonte Hill, the Marines' left and right flanks were forced back by the Japanese. Approximately six battalions were ready to attack the Americans by that time, and the offensive occurred in the rain on the night of 25 July. The offensive was made during that weather in order to take the Marines by surprise, but white illumination shells fired by the American fleet enabled the Marines to detect the attack. The Marines were saved by tanks, and the Japanese attack ended early in the morning of 26 July. Over 3,500 Japanese soldiers died in the attempt. After the failure of the counteroffensive, the Japanese began evacuations of their defenses at Fonte Hill, as ordered by Takashina. However, Takashina was killed in action while overseeing the retreat. His superior Hideyoshi Obata assumed command of Japanese forces on Guam, and committed suicide on 11 August, the day after Guam was liberated by American forces.

After the war, Takashina was posthumously implicated in the beheading of Guamanian civilian Vicente Lizama in June 1944. Sergeant Major Akiyoshi Hosokawa, who served as a witness for the prosecution at the war crimes trial of Tadao Igawa, testified that Igawa had beheaded Lizama on the orders of Takashina. Igawa, the inspector of the Japanese civilian police on Guam, was convicted of beheading Lizama, sentenced to death, and executed by hanging by U.S. naval authorities in Guam on September 24, 1947.

== Family ==
Takashina's son, Takehiko Takashina, was also a career military officer. He initially served in the Imperial Japanese Army, and after World War II rose to the rank of general in the Japan Ground Self-Defense Force and from 1978 to 1979 was the Chief of Staff, Joint Staff, the highest-ranking officer in the post-war Japanese military.

== See also ==
- 18th Infantry Regiment
