= The Imperial Cruise =

- Front cover
- Author: James Bradley
- Language: English
- Genre: history non-fiction historical revisionism
- Publisher: Back Bay Books / Little, Brown and Company
- Publication date: November 24, 2009
- Publication place: United States
- Media type: print (hardback & paperback)
- Pages: 400 pp (paperback)
- ISBN: 978-0-316-00895-2 (hardback) / ISBN 978-0-316-01400-7 (paperback)

The Imperial Cruise is a non-fiction book by James Bradley. In the book, Bradley examines American policy in the Pacific during the presidency of Theodore Roosevelt, with a particular focus on the fallout of a secret diplomatic delegation Roosevelt sent to Asia.

The book asserts that Roosevelt's diplomatic mistakes encouraged Japanese imperialism which ultimately backfired on the United States and led to the war in the Pacific. The book also suggests that the mission catalyzed many subsequent events in Asia, including the Chinese Communist Revolution and the Korean War, with lingering effects on U.S.–Asia relations in the 21st century. Bradley's sources include Roosevelt's personal letters and pictures. The book's historical accuracy has proved controversial, with some historians, specialists and reviewers calling Bradley's methods faulty.

== Synopsis ==
The book centers on the diplomatic mission of the SS Manchuria sent by President Theodore Roosevelt in the summer of 1905. On board was the largest diplomatic mission delegation in U.S. history, including some of the highest profile political figures of the time. They included Secretary of War (and future President) William Howard Taft; Roosevelt's daughter, Alice Roosevelt; her future husband, Congressman (and later Speaker of the House) Nicholas Longworth; 29 other members of the House and Senate, and their wives; and an array of additional high-ranking military and civilian officials.

After his initial description and introduction of the SS Manchuria's voyage, the author explores brief excerpts of the history behind the period's American domestic and foreign policy, elaborating on its influence, motivation, and consequences, specifically in regard to American–Japanese, Sino–Japanese, and Russo–Japanese relations.

More broadly, Bradley explores his contention relating to how deep-set racial tendencies, biases and racially deterministic philosophies fueled and undergirded virtually all U.S. foreign and domestic policy-making in that era pertaining to U.S. relations with other nations and to populations of other racial, cultural or religious heritages. This included virtually all peoples of non-Teutonic Anglo-Saxon descent, and resulted, for example, in the slaughter of more than 250,000 Filipinos during the U.S. colonial take-over of the Philippines.

Bradley contends that the actions of one Roosevelt, and the diplomatic cruise in the summer of 1905, lit the fuse that would doom more than 100,000 U.S. military personnel to die in the Pacific theater decades later under another Roosevelt in the 1940s. Through what Bradley describes as their "bumbling diplomacy", he describes how Theodore Roosevelt and his emissary Taft turned previously friendly Japanese sentiment against the United States.

== Critical reception ==
The Imperial Cruise has received mixed reviews. Writing for The New York Times Review of Books, Janet Maslin noted that "The Imperial Cruise is startling enough to reshape conventional wisdom about Roosevelt's presidency." At the same time, she criticized the author, writing that he favors "broad strokes and may at times be overly eager to connect historical dots, but he also produces graphic, shocking evidence of the attitudes that his book describes."

USA Today was neutral, calling it useful for readers who think that history "is the story of good guys and bad guys," and expressing disappointment with the "relentlessly sarcastic" tone and lack of ambiguity. Chiefly, USA Today noted an unresolved historical issue at the heart of Bradley's thesis, which argues that Japan was inspired by the visit of the U.S. delegation to pursue imperialistic expansion in 1905, when Japan had no such ambitions. Bradley's book argues that it was the American delegation's seminal influence that both inspired Japanese imperialistic adventurism, including eventually and ironically, their attack on Pearl Harbor, and also continuing tensions between the United States and Asian nations. While Bradley argues that "the U.S. Army had brought the Aryan to the Pacific coast," USA Today cited his failure to explain how "in the 1930s, imperial Japan would act on the secret words of a man dead for more than a decade and out of office since 1909."

Scholars such as M. Patrick Cullinane of Northumbria University reject Bradley's main themes as extreme exaggerations based on misinterpretations. Cullinane called Bradley's treatment of Roosevelt "grossly unfair" and said that the book ignored the Asian role in the multiple catastrophes which it blamed on Roosevelt.

Professor William N. Tilchin of Boston University attacked "Bradley's stupendously faulty analysis" and called The Imperial Cruise "a profoundly ignorant book even on the basic level of undisputed objective facts." He wrote:

The pomposity and the utter absurdity of The Imperial Cruise are starkly previewed in a single sentence in the book's sixth paragraph: "This book reveals that behind [Roosevelt's] Asian whispers that critical summer of 1905 was a very big stick—the bruises from which would catalyze World War II in the Pacific, the Chinese Communist Revolution, the Korean War, and an array of tensions that inform our lives today." (24) This grandiose, ridiculous assertion is made without even the remotest understanding of Theodore Roosevelt's diplomacy or of either U.S. foreign policy or internal Japanese developments between 1905 and 1941. The central notion that TR "gave" Korea to Japan—when Japan actually had previously secured control of Korea—is preposterous and, moreover, completely fails to explore the president's main alternative to endorsing Japanese rule: TR could have gratuitously antagonized Japan over this matter, thereby endangering the U.S. position in the Philippines and, more generally, signaling the Japanese that they should view the United States as a hostile rival.

Currently, The Imperial Cruise holds a 3.4/5 rating on LibraryThing.

== Other works by James Bradley ==
- Flags of Our Fathers (with Ron Powers). New York: Bantam, 2000. ISBN 0-553-11133-7
- Flyboys: A True Story of Courage. Boston: Little, Brown & Co., 2003. ISBN 0-316-10584-8

== See also ==
- Alice Roosevelt
- Japan–United States relations
- SS Manchuria
