= General Abe =

General Abe may refer to:

- Heisuke Abe (1886–1943), Imperial Japanese Army lieutenant general
- Nobuyuki Abe (1875–1953), Imperial Japanese Army general
- Norihide Abe (1887–1939), Imperial Japanese Army lieutenant general
