= Yoshio Tachibana =

Japanese officer, war criminal (1890–1947)

- 立花 芳夫
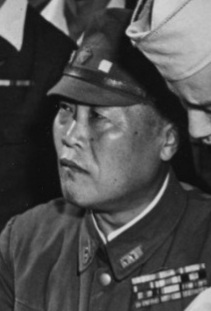
- Tachibana in 1945
- Born: February 24, 1890; Ehime Prefecture, Empire of Japan
- Died: September 24, 1947 (aged 57); Asan-Maina, Guam
- Known for: Chichijima incident
- Status: Executed by hanging
- Conviction: War crimes
- Penalty: Death
- Military career
- Allegiance: Empire of Japan
- Branch: Japanese Imperial Army
- Service years: 1913–1945
- Rank: Lieutenant General
- Commands: 1st Independent Mixed Brigade; 109th Infantry Division
- Conflicts: World War II

Yoshio Tachibana (立花 芳夫, Tachibana Yoshio; 24 February 1890 – 24 September 1947) was a lieutenant general in the Japanese Imperial Army during World War II. He was commander of the Japanese garrison in Chichijima, Ogasawara Islands, and was later tried and executed for the Chichijima incident, a war crime involving torture, extrajudicial execution and cannibalism of American prisoners of war.

== Biography ==
=== Early life and military career ===
Tachibana was a native of Ehime Prefecture. After graduating from a private school, he attended the 25th class of Imperial Japanese Army Academy and graduated in 1913. He had a relatively undistinguished early career as an officer. From September 1916 to January, he studied gymnastics at the Army Toyama School. He was promoted to captain in August 1923 and in March 1924 commanded a battalion of the IJA 12th Infantry Regiment. He subsequently served on the staff of the IJA 11th Division and was sent as an Army representative to the Takamatsu Commercial High School. He became a major in August 1930 and lieutenant colonel in August 1935. During the mid-1930s he was assigned to the Manchukuo Imperial Army as a liaison officer. In August 1939, he was given command of the IJA 65th Infantry Regiment, which saw combat at the Battle of Zaoyang–Yichang in the Second Sino-Japanese War.

=== World War II ===
In 1942, Tachibana was assigned to the staff of the Hiroshima regional defense command, and promoted to major general in March 1943. In May 1944, he became commander of the IJA 1st Independent Combined Brigade, which was tasked with the defense of the Ogasawara Islands against invasion by American forces in the preliminary preparations to Operation Downfall. He was further promoted to lieutenant general on March 23, 1945, and given command of the IJA 109th Division.

By mid-1945, due to the Allied naval blockade, the 25,000 Japanese troops on Chichijima had run low on supplies. However, although the daily ration of rice had been reduced from 400g per person a day to 240g, the troops were in no risk of starvation. In what later came to be called the Chichijima incident, and February/March 1945 Tachibana's senior staff turned to cannibalism. Nine American airmen escaped from their planes after being shot down during bombing raids on Chichijima, eight of whom were captured. The ninth, the only one to evade capture, was future US President George H. W. Bush, then a 20-year-old pilot. Over a period of several months, the prisoners were executed, and allegedly by the order of Major Sueyo Matoba, their bodies were butchered by the division's medical orderlies and the livers and other organs consumed by the senior staff, including Matoba's superior Tachibana.

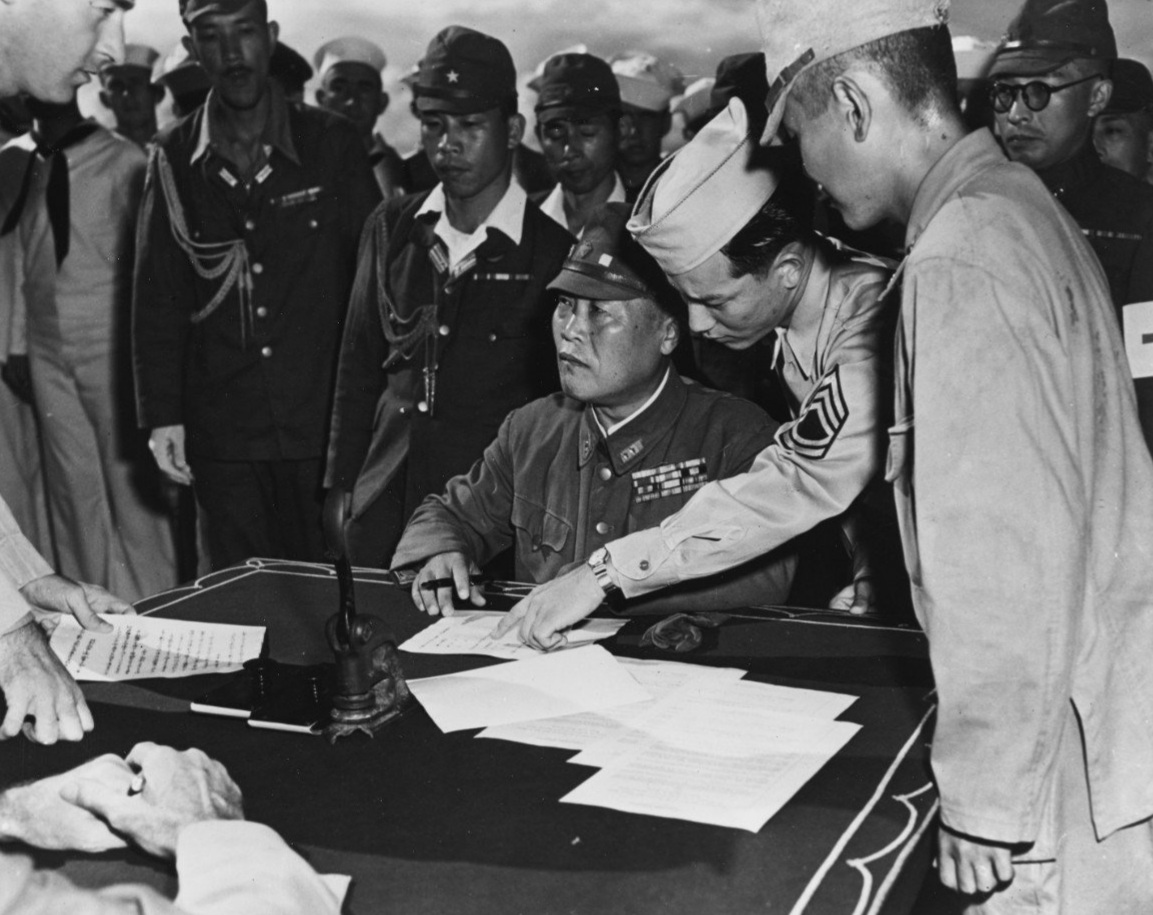
Tachibana prepares to sign documents surrendering the Bonin Islands

At the end of the war, Tachibana and his staff were arrested by the American occupation authorities and were deported to Guam, where they stood trial for war crimes in connection with the Chichijima Incident in August 1946. However, as cannibalism was not covered under international law at the time, Tachibana was charged with "prevention of honorable burial". Tachibana was sentenced to death by hanging along with four other defendants, including Major Matoba. He and the other defendants executed were buried in unmarked graves on Guam.

== Decorations ==
- 1945 – Order of the Sacred Treasure, 2nd class

== See also ==
- Cannibalism in Asia
- Flyboys: A True Story of Courage
- Japanese war crimes
- List of incidents of cannibalism
