= Beiping–Hankou Railway Operation order of battle =

The Order of battle Beiping–Hankou Railway Operation (August 1937 – January 1938)

== Japan ==
=== Order of battle as of mid August – December 1937 ===
North China Front Army – Field Marshal, Count Hisaichi Terauchi, [1]

- China Garrison Army – Lt. Gen. Kiyoshi Katsuki
  - China Stationed Infantry Brigade (Kawabe Brigade) – Major Gen. Masakazu Kawabe [1]
    - 1st China Stationed Infantry Regiment
    - 2nd China Stationed Infantry Regiment
  - China Stationed Cavalry Unit
  - China Stationed Artillery Regiment
  - China Stationed Engineer Unit
  - China Stationed Tank Unit (17 tanks)
  - China Stationed Signal Unit
  - Army Hospital
- 1st Army – Lt. General Kiyoshi Katsuki [1]
  - Detached Regiment of 5th Division [1] Note 1.
  - 14th Division – Gen. Kenji Doihara, 土肥原賢二[1]
    - 27th Infantry Brigade
      - 2nd Infantry Regiment
      - 59th Infantry Regiment
    - 28th Infantry Brigade
      - 15th Infantry Regiment
      - 50th Infantry Regiment
    - 20th Field Artillery Regiment
    - 18th Cavalry Regiment
    - 14th Engineer Regiment
    - 14th Transport Regiment
    - 2nd Tank Battalion – Col. Imada Note 3.
  - 6th Division – Lt. Gen. Hisao Tani 谷寿夫, [6][7]
    - 11th Infantry Brigade
      - 13th Infantry Regiment
      - 47th Infantry Regiment
    - 36th Infantry Brigade
      - 23rd Infantry Regiment
      - 45th Infantry Regiment
    - 6th Field Artillery Regiment
    - 6th Cavalry Regiment
    - 6th Engineer Regiment
    - 6th Transport Regiment
  - 20th Division – Lt. Gen Bunzaburo Kawagishi 川岸文三郎,[6][7] Note 2.
    - 39th Infantry Brigade
      - 77th Infantry Regiment
      - 78th Infantry Regiment
    - 40th Infantry Brigade
      - 79th Infantry Regiment
      - 80th Infantry Regiment
    - 26th Field Artillery Regiment
    - 28th Cavalry Regiment
    - 20th Engineer Regiment
    - 20th Transport Regiment
    - 1st Tank Battalion – Col. Baba, Note 2.
  - 108th Division – Lt-General Kumaya Shimomoto [6][7]
    - 25th Infantry Brigade
      - 117th Infantry Regiment
      - 132nd Infantry Regiment
    - 104th Infantry Brigade
      - 52nd Infantry Regiment
      - 105th Infantry Regiment
    - 108th Field Artillery
    - 108th Cavalry Regiment
    - 108th Engineer Regiment
    - 108th Transport Regiment
- 2nd Army – General Toshizō Nishio (early Oct. 37 from Hsiaofan Chen),[1]
  - 10th Division (Motorized Square Division) – Gen Rensuke Isogai (arrived early September)***?, [1]
    - 8th Infantry Brigade
      - 39th Infantry Regiment
      - 40th Infantry Regiment
    - 33rd Infantry Brigade
      - 10th Infantry Regiment
      - 63rd Infantry Regiment
    - 10th Field Artillery Regiment
    - 10th Cavalry Regiment
    - 10th Engineer Regiment
    - 10th Transport Regiment
  - 16th Division – Gen. Kesago Nakajima, 中島今朝吾[6][7]
    - 19th Infantry Brigade
      - 9th Infantry Regiment
      - 20th Infantry Regiment
    - 30th Infantry Brigade
      - 33rd Infantry Regiment
      - 38th Infantry Regiment
    - 22nd Field Artillery Regiment
    - 20th Cavalry Regiment
    - 16th Engineer Regiment
    - 16th Transport Regiment
  - 109th Division – Maj. General Yamaoka Shigeatsu 山岡重厚 [6][7]
    - 31st Infantry Brigade
      - 69th Infantry Regiment
      - 107th Infantry Regiment
    - 118th Infantry Brigade
      - 119th Infantry Regiment
      - 136th Infantry Regiment
    - 109th Mountain Artillery Regt
    - 109th Cavalry Regiment
    - 109th Engineer Regiment
    - 109th Transport Regiment

Army Airforce [2]

- Rinji Hikodan
  - 1st Hiko Daitai/16th Hiko Rentai – Captain Takeshi Takahashi
    - 1st Chutai (Kawasaki Ki-10)
    - 2nd Chutai (Kawasaki Ki-10)
    - Base: Changpeh (08/37 – 09/37), Hailang (10/37 – 09/38)
  - 2nd Hiko Daitai – Major Saburo Kondo
    - 2nd Chutai (Kawasaki Ki-10)
    - Base: Tientsin (07/37 – 12/37)

Notes:

- 1. Main force of the 5th Division was in Shanxi, involved in the Battle of Taiyuan. The temporarily detached regiment was supporting the attack on the Baoding area in mid September.[1]
- 2. After the Marco Polo Bridge Incident, the conflict between Japan and China became a general war. Japan sent two tank battalions to China from Japan proper in September 1937:
  - 1st Tank Battalion – Col. Baba
  - 2nd Tank Battalion – Col. Imada

These two tank battalions were assigned to the 1st Army in Hebei. The 1st Army started to attack the Chinese in the south of Peking on September 14, and advanced towards the south. Tanks were used for infantry support and tank battalions were attached to the infantry divisions. [3] The 1st Tank Battalion was attached to the IJA 20th Division.[3] 2nd Tank Battalion was attached to IJA 14th Division.[5]

=== Sources ===
[1] Hsu Long-hsuen and Chang Ming-kai, History of The Sino-Japanese War (1937–1945) 2nd Ed.,1971. Translated by Wen Ha-hsiung, Chung Wu Publishing; 33, 140th Lane, Tung-hwa Street, Taipei, Taiwan Republic of China. Pg. 184–191. Map 4

[2] Sino-Japanese Air War 1937–45

[3] Taki's IMPERIAL JAPANESE ARMY PAGE

[4] Madej, W. Victor, Japanese Armed Forces Order of Battle, 1937–1945 [2 vols], Allentown, Pennsylvania: 1981

[5] Forum: Pacific War 1941–1945, discussion about Shanghai Defense force Aug. 11 1937

[6] Generals from Japan

[7] 陸軍師団長一覧 (Generals of Division)

== China ==
=== Order of battle August – September 1937 [1] ===
1st War Area – Chiang Kai-shek [1] August – September 1937

- 2nd Group Army – Gen. Liu Chih, deputy Sun Lien-Chun
  - 1st Army – Sun Lien-chung
    - 27th Division – Fen An-pang [r]
    - 30th Division – Chang Chin-chao
    - 31st Division – Chih Feng-cheng
    - 44th Separate Brigade – Chang Hua-tang
  - 3rd Army – Tseng Wan-cheng
    - 7th Division – Tseng Wan-cheng (concurrent)
    - 12th Division – Tang Huai-yuan
  - 52nd Army – Kuan Lin-cheng
    - 2nd Division – Cheng tung-kuo[r]
    - 25th Division – Kuan Lin-cheng[r]
  - 14th Army – Feng Chien-tsai
    - 42nd Division – Liu Yen-piao
    - 169th Division – Wu Shih-ming
  - 47th Division – Pei Chang-hui
  - 17th Division – Cao Shou-shan
  - 177th Division – Li Hsing-chung
  - 5th Separate Brigade – Cheng Ting-chen
  - 46th Separate Brigade – Pao Kang
  - 14th Cavalry Brigade – Chang Can-Kuei
  - 4th Cavalry Army – Tan Tse-hsin (to Kaifeng mid Oct. 37)
    - 10th Cavalry Division – Tan Tse-hsin (concurrent)
- 14th Group Army – Gen. Wei Li Huang (to 2nd War Area, Oct. 12/ 37)
  - 85th Division – Chen Tieh
  - 14th Army – Li Mo-yen
    - 10th Division – Li Mo-yen (concurrent) [r]
    - 83rd Division – Liu Kan[r]
- 20th Group Army – Shang Chen[4]
  - 32nd Army – Wan Gu-lin
    - 139th Division – Huang Kuang-hun
    - 141st Division – Sung Ken-tang
    - 142nd Division – Lu Chi
- 53rd Army – Wan Fu-lin
  - 116th Division – Chow Fu-cheng
  - 130th Division – Chu Hung-hsun
  - 91st Division – Feng Chan-hai

=== Order of battle October 1937 – January 1937[1] ===
1st War Area – Cheng Qian [1]

- 1st Group Army – Gen. Liu Chih, deputy Sun Lien-Chun
  - 59th Army – Chang Tse-chung
    - 38th Division – Huang Wei-kang
    - 180th Division – Liu Tse-chen
  - 68th Army – Liu Ju-ming
    - 119th Division – Li Chin-tien
    - 143rd Division – Li Tseng-chih
  - 77th Army – Feng Chih-an
    - 37th Division – Chang Ling-yun
    - 179th Division – Ho Chi-feng
    - 132nd Division – Wang Chang-hai
  - 3rd Army – Cheng Ta-chang
    - 4th Cavalry Division – Wang Chi-feng
    - 9th Cavalry Division – Cheng Ta-chang
    - 139th Division – Huang Kuang-hun
  - 181st Division – Shih Yu-san
- 20th Group Army – Shang Chen
  - 32nd Army – Gen. Shan Chen (concurrent)
    - 141st Division – Sung Ken-tang
    - 142nd Division – Lu Chi
  - 46th Separate Brigade – Pao Kang (deactivated after battle of Changting, Oct. 37)
  - 14th Cavalry Brigade – Chang Can-Kuei
- 20th Group Army – Gen. Tang En-po
  - 52nd Army – Kuan Lin-cheng
    - 2nd Division – Cheng tung-kuo[r]
    - 25th Division – Kuan Lin-cheng[r]
  - 13th Army – Tang En-po (concurrent)
    - 4th Division – Chen Ta-ching [r]
    - 89th Division – Wang Chung-lien[r]
- 53rd Army – Wan Fu-lin
  - 116th Division – Chow Fu-cheng
  - 130th Division – Chu Hung-hsun
  - 91st Division – Feng Chan-hai

Airforce [2]

- 28th Pursuit Squadron / 5th Pursuit Group – Captain Chan Kee-Wong
  - Curtiss Hawk II and III Fighters, Gloster Gladiator Fighters

Note:

- [r] - Reorganized Divisions [3]

=== Sources ===
[1] Hsu Long-hsuen and Chang Ming-kai, History of The Sino-Japanese War (1937–1945) 2nd Ed.,1971. Translated by Wen Ha-hsiung, Chung Wu Publishing; 33, 140th Lane, Tung-hwa Street, Taipei, Taiwan Republic of China. Pg. 184–191, Map 4.

[2] Sino-Japanese Air War 1937–45

[3] History of the Frontal War Zone in the Sino-Japanese War, published by Nanjing University Press.

Besides the eight German trained Reorganized Divisions were 12 other Reorganized Divisions with Chinese arms on the reorganized model with two German advisors:

2nd, 4th, 10th, 11th, 25th, 27th, 57th, 67th, 80th, 83rd, 89th Division

These were to be trained by large teams of German advisors like the earlier eight divisions but the start of the war with Japan precluded that.

[4] Generals of World War II, China
