= Kōji Sakai =

Lieutenant general in the Imperial Japanese army and professor of French language

- 酒井 鎬次
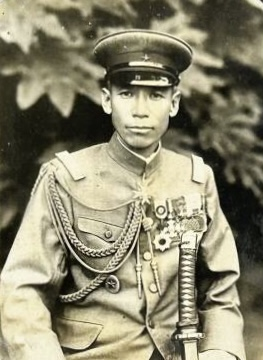
- Born: November 4, 1885; Aichi prefecture, Japan
- Died: March 2, 1973 (aged 87)
- Military career
- Allegiance: Empire of Japan
- Branch: Imperial Japanese Army
- Service years: 1905―1945
- Rank: Lieutenant General
- Commands: IJA 1st Independent Mixed Brigade, IJA 109th Division
- Conflicts: World War I (observer); Second Sino-Japanese War; World War II

Kōji Sakai (酒井 鎬次, Sakai Kōji; 4 November 1885 – 2 March 1973) was a lieutenant general in the Imperial Japanese Army during the Second Sino-Japanese War

== Biography ==
The younger son of a farmer in Aichi Prefecture, Sakai attended military preparatory schools and graduated from the 18th class of the Imperial Japanese Army Academy in 1905. He was commissioned into the Guard's 4th Infantry Regiment. He graduated from the 24th class of the Army Staff College with honors in 1912.

After serving in a staff position within the personnel department of the Imperial Japanese Army General Staff, Sakai was dispatched to France as a military attaché from 1915 to 1917, and was thus able to observe the fighting in World War I firsthand as an official observer from the Japanese government.

On his return to Japan, Sakai was again assigned to staff positions, but due to his fluency in French and European experience, was selected to participate in the Japanese delegation to the Versailles Peace Treaty negotiations. His rise through the ranks was steady and rapid thereafter: major in 1921, lieutenant colonel in 1925, colonel in 1929, and major general in 1931.

From 1927 to 1929, Sakai served on Japan's delegation to League of Nations. On his return to Japan, he was given command of the IJA 22nd Infantry Regiment from 1929 to 1931 and served as an instructor at the Army War College from 1931 to 1934. He was Commandant of the Imperial Japanese Army Academy from 1934 to 1936.

In 1936, Sakai was appointed commander of the IJA 24th Infantry Brigade, and was assigned to China with tensions rising in the prelude to the Second Sino-Japanese War. From 1937 to 1938, he was commander of the IJA 1st Independent Mixed Brigade under the Kwantung Army, which participated in Operation Chahar to seize Chahar Province from China. This brigade, with 744 vehicles, consisted of two tank battalions, a mechanized infantry regiment, field artillery, and engineering battalion, and was Japan's first mechanized brigade. However, during the Chahar campaign, the brigade was split into numerous small detachments for infantry support and was unable to achieve its full potential as an assault brigade. The small detachments suffered extensive damage and Sakai was in frequent conflict with the chief of staff of the Kwantung Army, Genera; Hideki Tojo over the strategy which the Kwantung army headquarters dictated. After the end of the operation, the brigade was dissolved and Sakai was transferred to rear echelon operations as commander of the IJA 7th Depot Division in 1938 and the IJA 109th Division in 1939.

He retired from active service in 1940. During the final stages of the Pacific War, he was recalled to active duty, but served in an advisory capacity to the Army General Staff from November 1943. Although not a member of the Imperial Way Faction, he had close ties to Genera Heisuke Yanagawa and provided information to Fumimaro Konoe and others who were attempting to remove Prime Minister Hideki Tojo from power.

After the end of the war, he worked as a professor at Ritsumeikan University, where he was known for his thesis on French President Georges Clemenceau and for war theory and strategy.
