= Chichijima incident =

1944 killing and cannibalization of American airmen

- Part of the Pacific Theatre of World War II
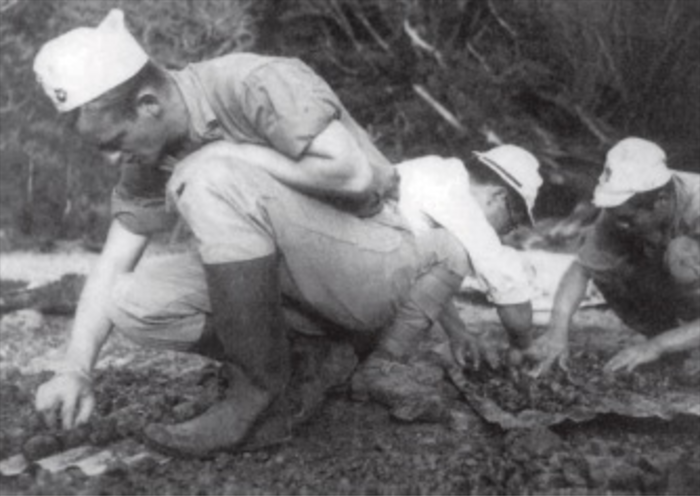
- US Marines searching for remains of killed POWs on Chichijima Island, 1946
- Date: September 1944
- Location: Chichijima, Bonin Islands, Empire of Japan; 27°05′00″N 142°11′30″E
- Also known as: Ogasawara incident
- Type: War crime, massacre, cannibalism
- Perpetrators: Imperial Japanese Army; Yoshio Tachibana
- Deaths: 8

The Chichijima incident (Japanese: 父島事件), also known as the Ogasawara incident (小笠原事件), was the 1944 murder of eight American prisoners of war on Chichijima, in the Bonin Islands, by their Japanese captors. The massacre was ordered by Lieutenent General Yoshio Tachibana. Japanese officers later cannibalized four of the victims, believing it would provide them health benefits.

== Incident ==
In September 1944, nine American aviators escaped from their planes after being shot down during bombing raids on Chichijima, the largest island in the Japanese archipelago of the Bonins. Eight of the airmen, Lloyd Woellhof, Grady York, James "Jimmy" Dye, Glenn Frazier Jr., Marvell "Marve" Mershon, Floyd Hall, Warren Earl Vaughn, and Warren Hindenlang were captured and eventually murdered. The ninth, and only one to evade capture, was future U.S. President George H. W. Bush, then a 20-year-old pilot. (Note: During an attack on a Japanese installation in Chichijima, Bush's aircraft successfully attacked several targets but was downed by enemy fire. Though both of Bush's fellow crew members died, Bush successfully bailed out from the aircraft and was rescued by the submarine USS Finback.)

After the war, it was discovered that the captured airmen had been beaten and tortured before being executed. The airmen were beheaded on the orders of Lt Gen. Yoshio Tachibana. Japanese officers then ate parts of the bodies of four of the men.

== Trials ==
Tachibana, alongside 11 other Japanese personnel, were tried in August 1946 in relation to the execution of U.S. Navy airmen, and the cannibalism of at least one of them, during August 1944. Because military and international law did not specifically deal with cannibalism, they were tried for murder and "prevention of honorable burial".

This case was investigated in 1947 in a war crimes trial, and of the 30 Japanese soldiers prosecuted, four officers (including Lieutenant General Tachibana, Major Matoba, and Captain Yoshii) were found guilty and hanged. All enlisted men and Probationary Medical Officer Tadashi Teraki were released within eight years.

Vice Admiral Mori Kunizo, who commanded Chichijima air base at the time of the incident, was of the belief that consumption of human liver had medical benefits. He was initially sentenced to life imprisonment for his involvement in the incident. However, after his subordinates were convicted of slaughtering prisoners during their time on the Southern Front, he was sentenced to death and subsequently hanged in a separate trial organized by the Netherlands for war crimes committed in the Dutch East Indies.

== Book ==
In the best-selling book Flyboys: A True Story of Courage, American author James Bradley details several instances of cannibalism of World War II Allied prisoners by their Japanese captors. Bradley claims that this included not only ritual cannibalization of the livers of freshly killed prisoners, but also the cannibalization-for-sustenance of living prisoners over the course of several days, amputating limbs only as needed to keep the meat fresh.

== See also ==
- Cannibalism in Asia
- Japanese war crimes
- List of incidents of cannibalism
