= Beiping–Hankou Railway Operation =

1937 Second Sino-Japanese War battle

- Part of the Second Sino-Japanese War and the interwar period
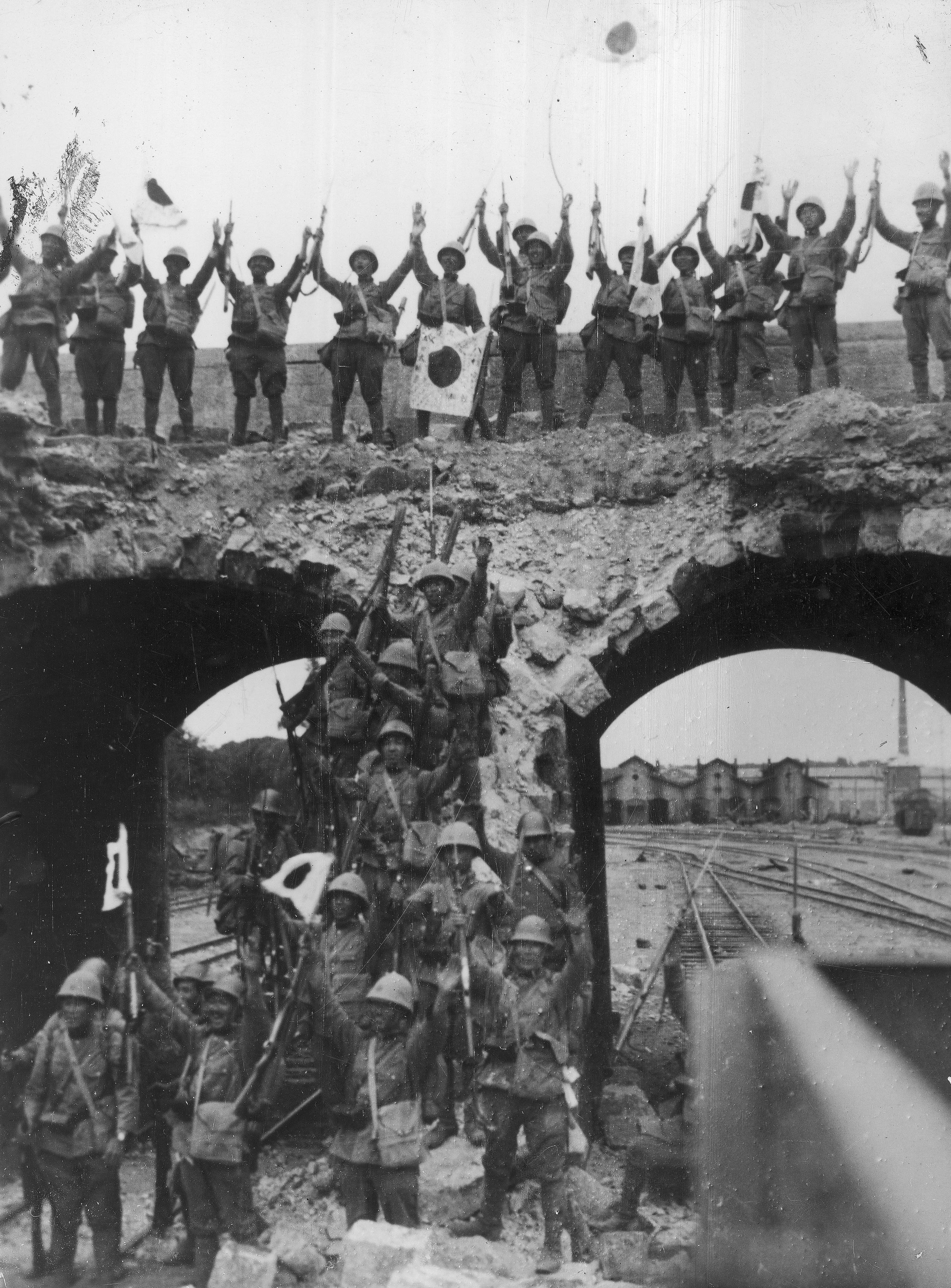
- Japanese soldiers after capturing one of the railway viaducts.
| Date | Mid-August – December 1937 |
| Location | Beiping–Hankou Railway, Republic of China |
| Result | Japanese victory |

Belligerents
| Japan | China |

Commanders and leaders
| (Empire of Japan) Hisaichi Terauchi (Empire of Japan) Kiyoshi Katsuki (Empire of Japan) Toshizō Nishio | (Republic of China (1912–1949)) Song Zheyuan |

Units involved
| Imperial Japanese Army; 5th division; 6th division; 14th division; 16th division; 20th division; 108th division; 109th division; Kawabe brigade | National Revolutionary Army Ground Forces: First Military Front : 30 divisions, 5 brigades, and 3 regiments (Note: The number of troops from many of the units in the battle order were based on their establishment strength, not their actual strength; Not including in the battle order were three divisions of the 14th army group, one division of the 3rd army corps, and two divisions of the 13th army corps) |

Strength
| 78,000; Chinese Claim : 192,400 | 297,347 |

Casualties and losses
| According to statistics of the First and Second Armies in major battles : Battles of Zhuozhou and Baoding (14 until 24 September 1937) : 1,047 killed and 3,083 wounded; Battles of Shijiazhuang and Fuyang River (late September until late October 1937) : First Army : 329 killed and 1,002 wounded Second Army : 82 killed and 235 wounded; Mopping-up operation against Song Zheyuan's army (4 November until 15 December 1937) : 264 killed and 996 wounded | From 14 September until 28 December 1937 : (Note: Based on very incomplete statistics, with only less than half of the units (totaling 5,934 officers and 100,141 soldiers) having reported their strength and losses); 467 officers and 13,932 soldiers killed 585 officers and 13,336 soldiers wounded 153 officers and 5,693 soldiers missing |

The Beiping–Hankou Railway Operation (Japanese: 京漢線作戦; Mid August – Dec. 1937) was a follow-up to the Battle of Beiping–Tianjin of the Japanese army in North China at the beginning of the 2nd Sino-Japanese War, fought simultaneously with Tianjin–Pukou Railway Operation. The attack was not authorized by the Imperial General Headquarters. The Japanese advanced to the south along the Beiping–Hankou Railway until the Yellow River, capturing Linfen along the way. After the Imperial General Headquarters wrestled control over troops from local commanders, the majority of participating Japanese units were transferred to participate in the concurrent Battle of Taiyuan. These units were replaced by newly formed 108th and 109th divisions.

== Operations ==
In September after securing Beijing and its surrounding area the Japanese army moved south in 2 armies. Their main objective was to secure the major cities and the railway lines connecting them.

=== Battle of Baoding ===
Japanese forces approached Baoding, which boasted a sixty-foot wall, two successive moats, and considerable amounts of barbed wire. If properly defended, the city could have held for weeks. Instead, it fell in a single day. The Japanese, as was to become commonplace, committed atrocities within the city after its fall. Acts of rape and murder were committed at the medical college of the city, which was burned, with many of its faculty thrown into the blazing fires.

The Japanese First Army recorded the battles of Zhuozhou and Baoding as a bloody and hard-fought one with losses at its highest of all battles in the Beiping-Hankou Railway Operation. The First Army suffered over 4,000 casualties while claiming enemy losses at 26,000.

=== Battle of Cheng'an and the Cheng'an Massacre ===
After the Marco Polo Bridge Incident, county magistrate Li Xizhang conscripted all able-bodied young men in Cheng'an county and organized his staff and police and local militias in the event of a Japanese assault, gathering over 8,000 guns. On October 17, the defenders were bolstered with Yao Zishou's battalion of the former 29th Army, a cavalry company of the 53rd Army, and some Chahar police officers. In the early morning of October 24, a Japanese unit attacked the northern wall of the county but was met with fierce machine gun fire from the defending soldiers and civilians. As the Japanese soldiers were thrown into chaos, Chinese soldiers, militia troops, and civilians descended from the walls and engaged the enemy in close combat. In the end, the Chinese claimed that, except for twenty to thirty Japanese soldiers who managed to escape, five hundred Japanese soldiers were killed.

After the battle, all the militia units withdrew from the county with the captured weapons and ammunition. That evening, more Japanese troops arrived and began bombarding the west gate. At that moment, the Kuomintang troops also retreated without organizing an evacuation. With the other gates already sealed off, except for some who were able to scale the walls and escaped, most of the civilians especially the women, elderly, and the children were left at the mercy of the Japanese Army. By the time the Japanese troops left the county to pursue the retreating Chinese Army, a large portion of the county population, less than 5,000 before the battle, had been massacred, with many being rounded up and machine-gunned in large-scale executions and atrocities, assaults, and murders committed against the women and children.

According to divisional commander Motojirō Taniguchi's situation report in February 1940, the Japanese 108th Division suffered 150 killed and 150 wounded at Cheng'an on October 24, 1937 while claiming 100 abandoned enemy corpses.

== Aftermath ==
After the stalemate at Yellow River from December 1937 to March 1938, the fighting resumed resulting in Battle of Xuzhou.

== See also ==
- Order of Battle Beiping–Hankou Railway Operation
