= Norihide Abe =

Imperial Japanese Army lieutenant general (1887–1939)

- 阿部 規秀
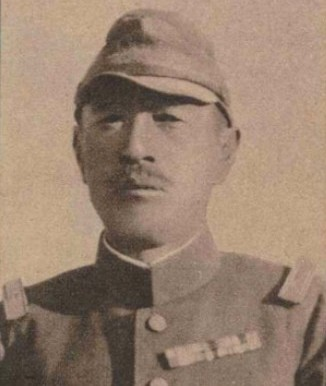
- Born: September 8, 1887; Goshogawara, Aomori, Japan
- Died: September 15, 1939 (aged 52); Laiyuan County, Hebei, China
- Burial place: Tama Cemetery, Tokyo
- Education: Imperial Japanese Army Academy
- Military career
- Allegiance: Empire of Japan
- Branch: Imperial Japanese Army
- Service years: 1907–1939
- Rank: Lieutenant general
- Units: 32nd Infantry Regiment, 8th Division, 1st Division, Kwantung Army, Mongolia Garrison Army, Japanese North China Area Army
- Commands: Sendai Army Training School, 32nd Infantry Regiment, 1st Infantry Brigade, 2nd Independent Mixed Brigade
- Conflicts: Second Sino-Japanese War †
- Awards: Order of the Golden Kite, 3rd Class; Order of the Rising Sun, 1st Class

Norihide Abe (阿部 規秀, Abe Norihide; September 8, 1887 – November 7, 1939) was a career officer and lieutenant general in the Imperial Japanese Army who was the highest-ranking Japanese officer killed in combat during the Second Sino-Japanese War.

== Biography ==
Abe was born in Nanawa Village, Kitatsugaru District, Aomori (present-day city of Goshogawara, Aomori). He graduated from the Imperial Japanese Army Academy on May 31, 1907, and served in the IJA 32nd Infantry Regiment, the IJA 8th Division and on the staff of the IJA 18th Division. From April 11, 1932, to August 1, 1935, he was commandant of the Sendai Army Training School. He commanded the IJA 32nd Infantry Regiment from August 1, 1935, to August 2, 1937, and was commander of the IJA 1st Infantry Brigade of the 1st Division, which was attached to the Kwantung Army in Japanese-occupied Manchuria, where he was promoted to major general, from August 2, 1937, to June 1, 1939. On June 1, 1939, he became commander of the 2nd Independent Mixed Brigade, which was attached to the Mongolia Garrison Army of the Japanese North China Area Army, and was promoted to lieutenant General on October 2, 1939.

On October 26, 1939, Abe led 1,500 men from the 2nd and 4th Regiments of the 2nd Independent Mixed Brigade out of its garrison at Kalgan south for a counterinsurgency operation against the Chinese 120th Division of the Communist Eighth Route Army under General He Long in Hebei Province. However, operations were quickly bogged down by the guerrilla warfare tactics employed by the Chinese, who made good use of the rugged terrain of the Taihang Mountains and were able to encircle the Japanese forces. In the afternoon of November 7, his camp headquarters was attacked by a mortar shell fired by Chinese guerrillas and Abe was severely wounded in the legs and abdomen. Refusing to order a withdrawal, he died later that night of his injuries. Following Abe's death, Japanese reinforcement rescued the remainder of his command and forced the Eighth Route Army to retreat.

After the battle, Mao Zedong personally issued a telegram praising the 18-year-old soldier Li Erxi (李二喜, 1920–2010), who fired the mortar, and proclaimed him to be a hero of the anti-Japanese resistance. The mortar itself is listed as a First-Class Cultural Artefact and is displayed at the Military Museum of the Chinese People's Revolution in Beijing.

Abe was posthumously awarded the Grand Cordon of the Order of the Rising Sun. His cremated ashes were buried at the Tama Cemetery in Tokyo.

== Military career ==
From	To	Appointment
-	31.05.1907	Military Academy
11.04.1932	01.08.1935	Commandant of Cadets Sendai Army Training School
01.08.1935	02.08.1937	32nd Infantry Regiment Commander
02.08.1937	01.06.1939	1st Brigade Commander
01.06.1939	03.11.1939	2nd Independent Mixed Brigade Commander
03.11.1939	-	Killed in action

== Promotions ==
Date of Award	Military Rank
26.12.1907	2nd Lieutenant
01.08.1933	Colonel
02.08.1937	Major General
02.10.1939	Lieutenant General
