= Chichijima Airfield =

Airfield on the island of Chichi-jima, Japan

- IATA: none; ICAO: RJAO

Summary
- Airport type: Military
- Operator: Japan Maritime Self-Defense Force
- Location: Chichi-jima
- Coordinates: 27°05′23″N 142°11′29″E
- Interactive map of Chichijima Airfield

Runways
Direction	Length		Surface
Direction	m	ft	Surface
	80	262	Asphalt concrete

Chichijima Airfield (父島飛行場, Chichijima Hikōjō) (ICAO: RJAO) is an airfield on the island of Chichi-jima in Japan. It has a landing slope facility for flying boats (e.g. Shin Meiwa US-1A/US-2) and a heliport for the Japan Maritime Self-Defense Force (JMSDF) Chichijima Naval Base.

Both bases were under the control of the United States Navy from shortly after Japan's surrender in 1945 up to 1968. During that time the naval base was known as Chichi Jima Naval Base.

Plans to build a full airport have been created and withdrawn several times, because of environmental concerns.
