= James Bradley (American author) =

American author (1954–2026)

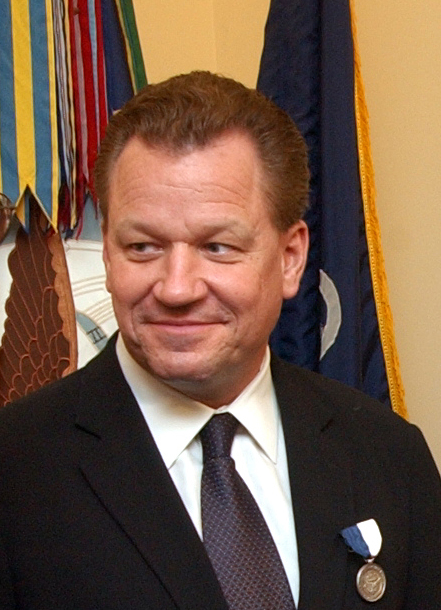
Bradley being presented with the Department of the Navy Superior Public Service Medal, November 2003

James Joseph Bradley (February 18, 1954 – June 5, 2026) was an American author from Antigo, Wisconsin, specializing in historical non-fiction chronicling the Pacific theater of World War II. His father, John Bradley, was involved in the first raising of the American flag on Mount Suribachi during the Battle of Iwo Jima in February 1945.

== Early life and education ==
James Bradley was born in Antigo, Wisconsin, on February 18, 1954, and grew up in that state. After studying at the University of Notre Dame in Notre Dame, Indiana, and the Sophia University in Tokyo, he earned a degree in East Asian History from the University of Wisconsin-Madison.

== Career ==
External videos
- Booknotes interview with Bradley on Flags of Our Fathers, July 9, 2000, C-SPAN

In 2000, Bradley published Flags of Our Fathers, written with Ron Powers, which tells the story of five U.S. Marines and a U.S. Navy corpsman attached to the Marines Corps (his father, John Bradley, who did not raise the second, larger flag), raising the American flag during the Battle of Iwo Jima and the Seventh War Loan Drive after the battle. In the book, which spent 46 weeks on the New York Times bestseller list and was made into a film directed by Clint Eastwood, Bradley took great care to locate and speak with family and friends who actually knew the men depicted. In doing so, he received praise for his realistic portrayals and bringing the men involved to life.

The book and the film are in-depth looks at those involved and their war-time service. Of the six men who raised the second and larger replacement flag on Mount Suribachi on February 23, 1945, PhM2c. John Bradley, although he had been involved in only the first raising of a smaller flag hours before, was not involved in the second flag raising, Pfc. Ira Hayes and Pfc. Rene Gagnon were the only survivors of the battle. Sgt. Michael Strank, Cpl. Harlon Block, and Pfc. Franklin Sousley were killed in action later on in the battle. The book and film tell the story in a before, during, and after format and both were well received. An impromptu speech Bradley, who did not raise the flag, gave at the Marine Corps War Memorial (sometimes called the Iwo Jima memorial) was transcribed by Michael T. Powers in October 2000, and widely circulated on the Internet. On June 23, 2016, the United States Marine Corps identified Cpl. Harold Schultz as the sixth flag raiser for the second flag.

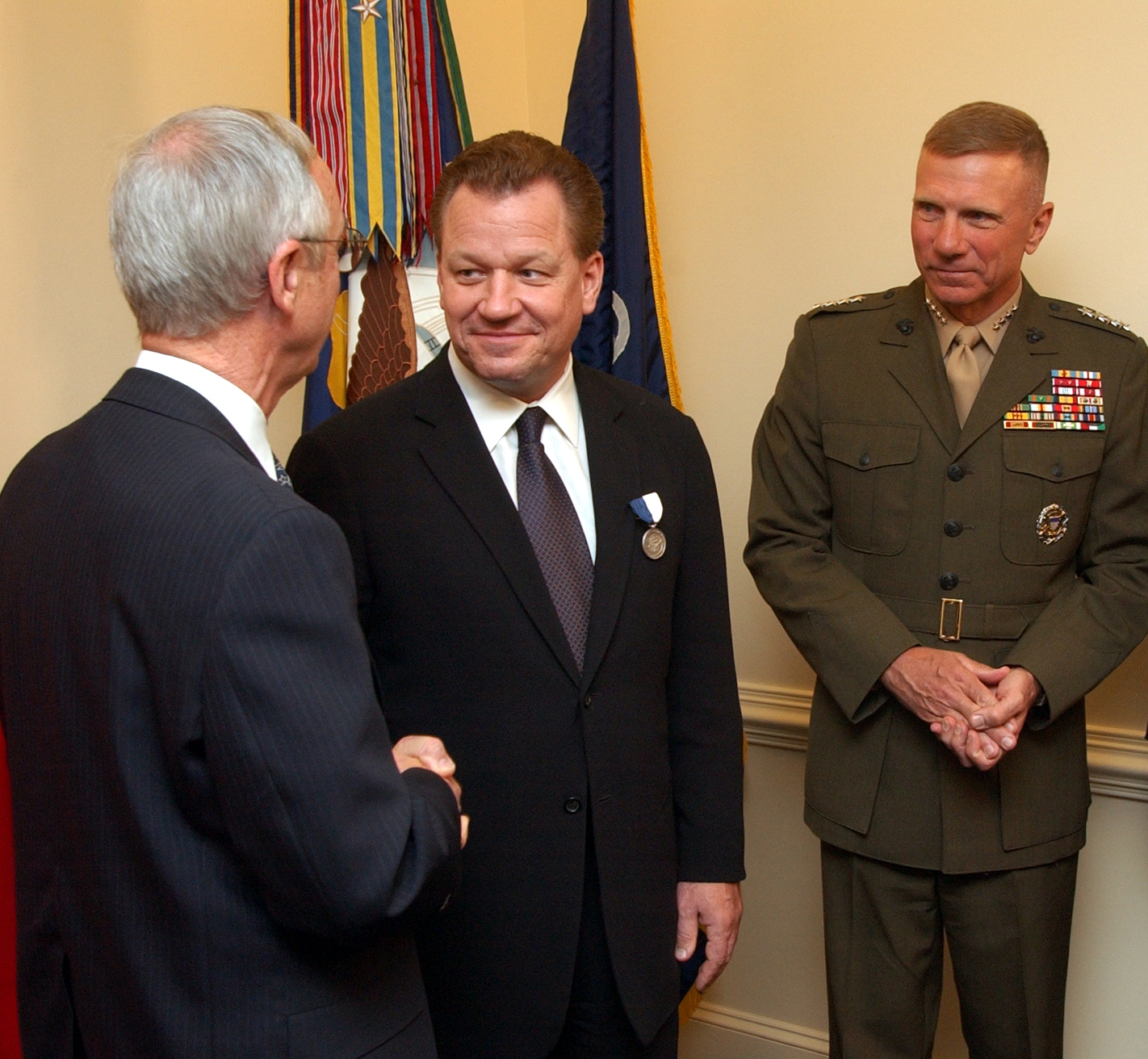
Secretary of the Navy Gordon R. England presents Bradley with the Department of the Navy Superior Public Service Award for his contributions in keeping alive the history of the Navy and Marine Corps, November 18, 2003.

In 2003, Bradley published Flyboys: A True Story of Courage. The book tells the story of an air raid which took place during the Battle of Iwo Jima, some 150 miles away, when United States warplanes bombed the small communications outpost on Chichi Jima. While Iwo Jima had Japanese forces numbering 22,000, Chichi Jima's forces numbered 25,000. Nine American crewmen survived after being shot down in the raid. One was picked up by the American submarine USS Finback. That was Lieutenant George H. W. Bush, who later became the 41st President of the United States. The other eight were captured as POWs by the Japanese and were executed and eaten, in an incident which remained hidden until much later. Like Flags of Our Fathers, Flyboys: A True Story of Courage also topped the New York Times Bestseller list when it came out.

In 2009, he published his third New York Times best selling book, The Imperial Cruise. It concerns the 1905 diplomatic mission led by Secretary of War William Howard Taft and Alice Roosevelt, as well as the larger implications of President Theodore Roosevelt's foreign policy, particularly with regard to Japan. The New York Times published a complimentary review, writing, "His thesis in 'The Imperial Cruise' is startling enough to reshape conventional wisdom about Roosevelt's presidency." The book exposes the blatantly racist and exploitative policy of the United States in its attempt to extend its influence into the Pacific rim, acquiring Hawaii by conquest and the Philippines by purchase from the Spanish after ostensibly having entered the conflict to aid the Filipino freedom fighters. The American occupation was marked by torture and repression of the very people they had come to help.

The China Mirage: The Hidden History of American Disaster in Asia is James's fourth book, detailing America's involvement in China since the early 19th Century during the heights of opium trade, through the conclusion of World War II and Mao Zedong's rise to power. The premise of the book is how the U.S. failed to understand Asian cultures which led to poor decision-making by policy makers in the U.S. State Department as well as by both President Theodore Roosevelt and Franklin Roosevelt. Ultimately, Bradley makes the suggestion that the War in the Pacific, the Korean War, and the Vietnam War would have been avoided had President Franklin Roosevelt not been unduly influenced by the China Lobby which supported Chiang Kai-shek.

== Death ==
Bradley died on June 5, 2026, at the age of 72.

== Publishing details ==
- Flags of Our Fathers; (with Ron Powers). New York: Bantam, 2000; ISBN 0-553-11133-7 OCLC 43555111
- Flyboys: A True Story of Courage; Boston: Little, Brown, and Co., 2003; ISBN 0-316-10584-8 OCLC 52071383
- The Imperial Cruise: The Secret History of Empire and War; Boston: Little, Brown & Co., 2009; ISBN 0-316-00895-8 OCLC 430522360
- The China Mirage: The Hidden History of American Disaster in Asia; Boston: Little, Brown & Co., 2015; ISBN 0-316-19667-3 OCLC 870199580
