= 108th Division (Imperial Japanese Army) =

- Active: 1937 - 1945
- Country: Empire of Japan
- Branch: Imperial Japanese Army
- Type: Infantry
- Size: 18141
- Garrison/HQ: Hirosaki
- Nickname: "Help/Divine Protection" Division
- Engagements: Second Sino-Japanese War; Soviet invasion of Manchuria

Commanders
- Notable commanders: Koyama Shimomoto

The 108th Division (第108師団, Dai-hyakuhachi Shidan) was an infantry division of the Imperial Japanese Army. Its call sign was the Help/Divine Protection Division (祐兵団, Yū Heidan). It was formed on 24 August 1937 in Hirosaki as a square division. The nucleus for the formation was the 8th Division headquarters. It was subordinated from the beginning to the 1st Army in North China. Part of the personnel served a second tour in 1942 with the 69th Division.

== Action ==
=== First formation ===
The 108th Division was sent to the ongoing Beiping–Hankou Railway Operation in October 1937 and had the distinction of capturing Linfen from Chinese forces. Later it was responsible for security in Shanxi province. The division returned to Japan in January 1940 and was dissolved in February 1940. From the start of the Second Sino-Japanese War until its return to Japan in January 1940, the 108th Division suffered 2,205 killed, 452 dead from illnesses, and 5,575 wounded.

=== Second formation ===
As the situation in the Pacific War deteriorated, the 108th Division was re-established 12 July 1944 in Chengde as a triangular division. It was assigned directly to the Kwantung Army, fighting Chinese Communist forces in the Chengde area. In early 1945, the 171st Cavalry Regiment joined the division.

On 23 May 1945, the division was reassigned to the 3rd Area Army, and reinforced by a veterinary detachment plus an ordnance company. Gradually, during June 1945 the 108th Division was re-deployed to counter the Soviet threat. Some elements of the division were left behind in Chengde for a planned anti-communist offensive. On 1 August 1945, the most capable men of the infantry and cavalry regiments were assembled into an assault battalion, leaving vacancies behind. At the same time, the divisional artillery battalion was expanded to an artillery regiment. The majority of men drafted during this wave of expansion were not armed (not even with rifles or bayonets), and did not have uniforms. The 108th Division was still drafting as late as 13 August 1945.

With the start of the Soviet invasion of Manchuria, the 108th Division was at Jinzhou. On 10 August 1945, the Mizunuma detachment, comprising an infantry battalion and an artillery battalion, was reassigned to the 136th Division. At the same time, the rest of the 108th Division was reassigned to the 44th Army. The Soviet invasion of Manchuria finished with the surrender of Japan before the 108th Division saw any major combat. At the termination of hostilities, the 108th Division was at Liaoyang. A total of 110 men from the 108th Division were killed during the service.

== See also ==
- List of Japanese Infantry Divisions

== Notes ==
- This article incorporates material from Japanese Wikipedia page 第108師団 (日本軍), accessed 14 June 2016

== Reference and further reading ==
- Madej, W. Victor. Japanese Armed Forces Order of Battle, 1937-1945 [2 vols]

Allentown, PA: 1981
