= 312th Independent Infantry Battalion (Imperial Japanese Army) =

The 312th Infantry Battalion of the Imperial Japanese Army participated in the Battle of Iwo Jima as part of the 2nd Mixed Brigade. Its job was to defend Mount Suribachi and the approaches to Mount Suribachi. By D+4 of the battle most of the men in the unit were killed, wounded and/or captured. On the night of February 22, 1945 (D+3) some 100-120 men of the battalion attempted to escape from Mount Suribachi to join the rest of the troops in the north.

The battalion also saw action in China earlier in the war (before the battle of Iwo Jima).
