= 29th Division (Imperial Japanese Army) =

- Active: 1 April 1941 – September 1945
- Country: (Empire of Japan) Japan
- Branch: Imperial Japanese Army
- Type: Infantry
- Role: reserve
- Size: 20,060 men
- Garrison/HQ: Liaoyang
- Nickname(s): Thunder Division
- Engagements: World War II: Battle of Guam (1944); Battle of Tinian

Commanders
- Notable commanders: Takeshi Takashina

The 29th Division (第29師団, Dai-nijukyū Shidan) was an infantry division in the Imperial Japanese Army. Its call sign was the Thunder Division (雷兵団, Ikazuchi Heidan), also Ikazuchi 3200 and Ikazuchi 3229 was used. The 29th Division was formed on 1 April 1941 as a standard (Type B) triangular division in Nagoya city.

== Action ==
The 29th division was tasked with the defense of the Liaoyang area in Manchukuo state, as part of the strategic reserve under direct control of the Kwantung Army. In early March 1944, the division was taken out of reserve and assigned to the 31st Army. The bulk of the division, comprising the 18th and 38th infantry regiments, was sent to Guam island together with the 48th Independent Mixed Brigade. Smaller detachments were sent to Tinian and Rota islands.

Battle of Guam (1944) started on 21 July 1944. On the evening of 25 July 1944 General Takeshi Takashina ordered several banzai charges, all of which were repulsed with the Japanese suffering heavy losses. Takashina himself was mortally wounded 28 July 1944, and the division ceased to function as an organized unit. All resistance to US forces ceased 10 August 1944.

The island of Tinian was protected by 8039-strong Japanese force, including 50th infantry regiment and a 29th tank company. The Battle of Tinian have started 24 July 1944, and by 30 July the remnants of the Japanese forces were holed up in the caves on the north of the island. Resistance on Tinian ended by 3 August 1944. Only about 200 men of the Japanese garrison survived the fighting.

The Rota island was never invaded, although it was sporadically bombed by the US aircraft until the surrender of Japan 15 August 1945.

The 29th division was officially dissolved in September 1945.

== See also ==
- List of Japanese Infantry Divisions
- This article incorporates material from the Japanese Wikipedia page 第29師団 (日本軍), accessed 10 March 2016

== Reference and further reading ==
- Madej, W. Victor. Japanese Armed Forces Order of Battle, 1937-1945 [2 vols]

Allentown, PA: 1981
