= Hideyoshi Obata =

Imperial Japanese Army general (1890–1944)

- 小畑 英良
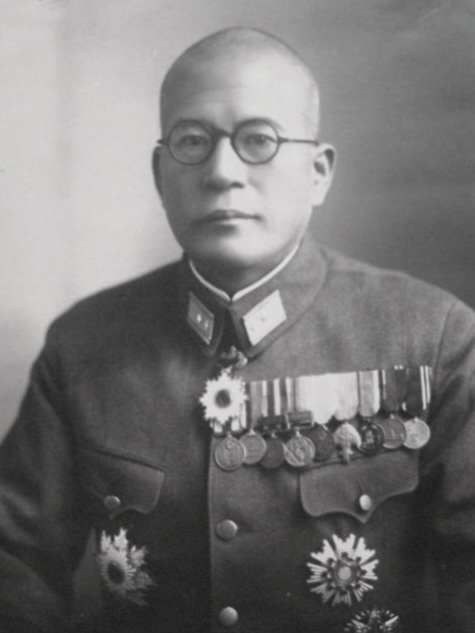
- Born: 2 April 1890; Osaka, Japan
- Died: 11 August 1944 (aged 54); Guam
- Military career
- Allegiance: Empire of Japan
- Branch: Imperial Japanese Army
- Service years: 1911–1944
- Rank: General (posthumous)
- Commands: 5th Air Division; 3rd Air Army; Thirty-First Army
- Conflicts: World War I; World War II; Battle of Guam ‡‡

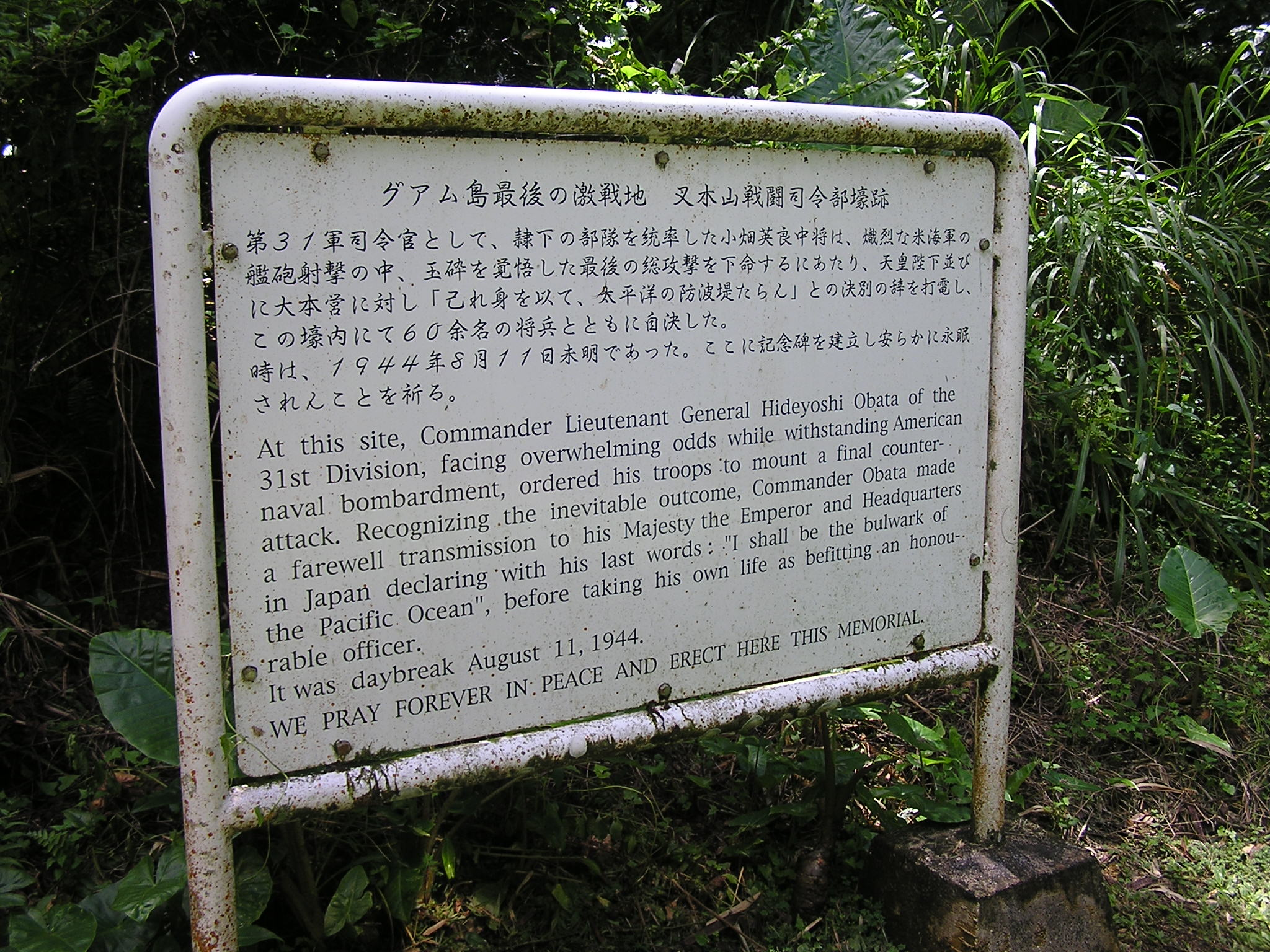
Marker at site of Obata's death in Yigo, Guam

Hideyoshi Obata (小畑 英良, Obata Hideyoshi; 2 April 1890 – 11 August 1944) was a general in the Imperial Japanese Army in World War II.

== Biography ==
Obata was the fifth son of a Chinese language scholar from Osaka Prefecture. He attended military preparatory schools and graduated from the 23rd class of the Imperial Japanese Army Academy in December 1911, specializing in cavalry operations. In 1919, he graduated from the 31st class of the Army War College and was promoted to the rank of captain in the cavalry.

From April 1923, Obata was assigned as a military attaché to the United Kingdom and from November 1927 to August 1934 as military attaché to British India. In August 1934, he was promoted to colonel in the cavalry and recalled to Japan for staff postings within the Imperial Japanese Army General Staff.

Obata was promoted to major general in March 1938, and was reassigned from cavalry to army aviation. He was appointed Commandant of the Akeno Army Air School in August 1938. In December 1940, he was promoted to lieutenant general and commander of the IJA 5th Air Group in Taiwan, where he was stationed at the start of the Pacific War. His command was subsequently assigned to the Burma front in 1942. In May 1943, he became commander in chief of the IJA 3rd Air Army but was recalled to Tokyo in December.

On 18 February 1944, Obata was assigned command of the Thirty First Army, with the IJA 29th Division and IJA 53rd Division in charge of the defense of the Mariana Islands from the approaching Allied forces. He was away from his headquarters on Saipan at the time of the American invasion and established his new command post on Guam. However, at the Battle of Guam he ordered an all-out attack at midnight, 25 July 1944, but was soon overwhelmed by superior American numbers and firepower, losing more than 80% of his men. He retreated with his forces to the northern end of the island, and most of these men were killed in attacks on American armored forces in early August. Obata committed seppuku on 11 August 1944 in Yigo, Guam, ending Japanese attempts to hold the island. Obata was promoted posthumously to the rank of general.

His wife was a daughter of Field Marshal Kawamura Kageaki.
