= 2nd Independent Mixed Brigade =

2nd Independent Mixed Brigade (Imperial Japanese Army)
- Active: 1938-1945
- Country: Japan
- Allegiance: Emperor of Japan
- Branch: Imperial Japanese Army
- Type: Mixed brigades
- Part of: 109th Division (Imperial Japanese Army)
- Garrison/HQ: Mongolia Garrison Army
- Engagements: World War II

The 2nd Independent Mixed Brigade or 2nd Mixed Brigade of the Imperial Japanese Army was formed in March 1938, from five battalions already attached to the Mongolia Garrison Army, of the 109th Division (first formation).

== Organization ==
2nd Independent Mixed Brigade

- 2nd Independent Infantry Battalion
- 3rd Independent Infantry Battalion
- 4th Independent Infantry Battalion
- 5th Independent Infantry Battalion
- 312th Independent Infantry Battalion (Imperial Japanese Army)
- Artillery Troops
- Signal Troops

== See also ==
- Independent Mixed Brigades (Imperial Japanese Army)
