= Flyboys: A True Story of Courage =

2003 book by James Bradley

- Hardcover edition
- Author: James Bradley
- Subject: World War II
- Publisher: Little, Brown
- Publication date: 2003
- ISBN: 978-0-316-10584-2
- Dewey Decimal: 940.54/05/09528 21
- LC Class: D804.J3 B73 2003

Flyboys: A True Story of Courage is a 2003 nonfiction book by writer James Bradley, and was a national bestseller in the US. The book details a World War II incident of the execution and cannibalism of five of eight American POWs on the Pacific island of Chichi-jima, one of the Ogasawara Islands (Bonin Islands). This event is now known as the Chichijima incident.

== Overview ==
The book documents the backgrounds of several American airmen who flew raids over Japan during World War II, and includes interviews with Japanese veterans of the conflict as well as the family and friends of some of the American airmen. It describes an air raid over the island of Chichi-jima in which nine crewmen survived being shot down, with eight captured and subsequently killed and cannibalized by their captors. The ninth crewman and future US president, Lieutenant George H. W. Bush, eluded capture. These atrocities were discovered in late 1945 following the conclusion of the war and were investigated as part of the war crimes trials. In 1946, 30 Japanese soldiers were court-martialed on Guam and four officers (Maj. Matoba, Gen. Tachibana, Adm. Mori and Capt. Yoshii) were found guilty and hanged.

Bradley also devotes part of the book to describing the advance of military airpower during World War II, and describing the American bombardment of Japanese cities with napalm, which brought more death and devastation than the atomic bombs dropped on Hiroshima and Nagasaki.
