= Thirty-First Army (Japan) =

Japanese Thirty First Army
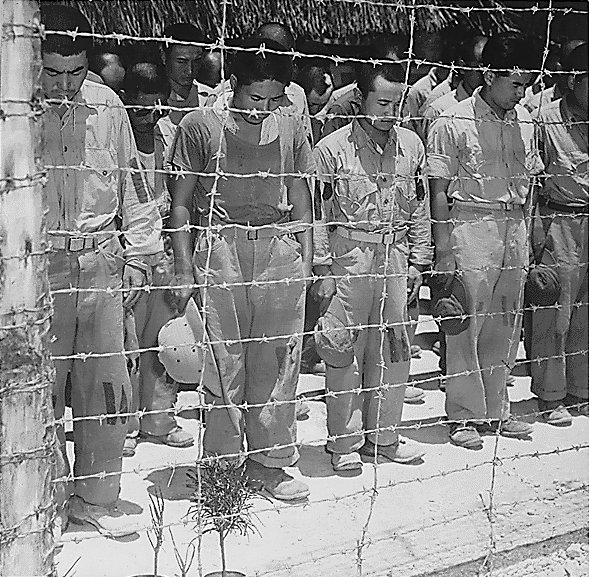
- Japanese POWs at Guam at time of the surrender of Japan
- Active: February 18, 1944 - August 15, 1945
- Country: Empire of Japan
- Branch: Imperial Japanese Army
- Type: Infantry
- Role: Corps
- Garrison/HQ: Truk
- Engagements: Operation Hailstone; Battle of Saipan; Battle of Guam

The Japanese 31st Army (第31軍, Dai-sanjyū-ichi gun) was an infantry army corps of the Imperial Japanese Army (IJA) during World War II that specialized in coastal defence in the responsible areas and combat in tropical rainforest environments using combined arms.

== History ==
The Japanese 31st Army was formed on February 18, 1944 under the Imperial General Headquarters as a garrison force to contest landings by Allied forces in the Japanese South Seas Mandate island-by-island, and to inflict such losses in a war of attrition that it would deter an American invasion of the Japanese home islands. The South Seas Mandate was divided into three sections (Northern Mariana Islands, southern Mariana Islands, and Truk). The 80,000 man Japanese 31st Army was initially headquartered on Truk.

After Operation Hailstone, the Japanese garrison on Truk was isolated as American forces continued their advance towards Japan by invading other Pacific islands. Cut off, the Japanese forces on Truk and other central Pacific islands ran low on food and faced starvation before Japan surrendered in August 1945. (Stewart, 1986)

The garrisons in the Marianas were largely annihilated at the Battle of Saipan and Battle of Guam.

== Structure ==
Thirty-First Army

- Southern Marianas Force
  - 29th Infantry Division
  - 48th Independent Infantry Brigade
- Northern Marianas Force
  - 43rd Infantry Division
  - 47th Independent Infantry Brigade
- Truk Garrison Force
  - 52nd Infantry Division
  - 50th Independent Infantry Brigade
  - 51st Independent Infantry Brigade
  - 52nd Independent Infantry Brigade

== List of commanders ==
=== Commanding officer ===
	Name	From	To
1	General Hideyoshi Obata	25 February 1944	11 August 1944
2	Major General Yoshitomo Tamura	11 August 1944	22 August 1944
3	Lieutenant General Toshisaburo Mugikura	22 August 1944	1 September 1945

=== Chief of Staff ===
	Name	From	To
1	Major General Keiji Igeta	25 February 1944	6 July 1944
2	Major General Yoshitomo Tamura	14 July 1944	11 August 1944
