= Absolute National Defense Zone =

The Absolute National Defense Zone (Japanese: 絶対国防圏, Hepburn: Zettai Kokubōken) was a grand strategic concept established by Japanese elite leadership during World War II to guide decision-making. After Japan had lost the ability to carry out offensive operations, the concept defined a geographic perimeter (zone) to be held at any cost, established on 30 September, 1943, by the Japanese cabinet and subsequently affirmed in an Imperial Conference (Gozen Kaigi) to guide military planning. It was not part of the propaganda used to motivate the general public, but served to coordinate efforts between the Imperial Army and Navy and government ministries. For example, the Imperial Army reassigned two divisions from China to western New Guinea, which was within the Absolute Zone (see: Take Ichi convoy). After the Absolute Zone was breached by the successful Allied invasion of Saipan in June 1944, the Tōjō cabinet lost credibility and fell, replaced by the Koiso cabinet.

== Definition ==
The defense zone was established in the "Outline for Future War Guidance," a policy decided upon during a Cabinet meeting and an Imperial Conference held on September 30, 1943. The outline stipulated: "Regarding the conduct of the Imperial War, the vital regions that must be absolutely secured in the Pacific and Indian Ocean theaters shall constitute a zone encompassing the Kuril Islands, the Bonin Islands, the Inner South Seas (central and western sectors), Western New Guinea, the Sunda Islands, and Burma". Specifically, the designated scope encompassed the Inner South Seas—excluding the eastern sector (the Marshall Islands)—namely the Mariana Islands and the Caroline Islands, as well as the territories extending westward from New Guinea, beginning at Geelvink Bay (present-day Cenderawasih Bay).

== Background ==
During World War II, Japan's military responsibilities were divided between the Navy—which focused primarily on the Pacific Ocean as its main theater of operations—and the Army, which focused on mainland China and Southeast Asia. The specific regions designated as the "Absolute National Defense Zone" closely aligned with the strategic priorities established by the Army. However, while the zone was successfully designated on paper, the practical means required to realize and maintain it—including offensive capabilities, defensive fortifications, supply lines, strategic doctrine, and the capacity to defend sea lanes—were already so deficient that conducting military operations across such a vast geographical area had, in reality, become virtually impossible.

The Imperial Army expressed confidence that the Absolute National Defense Zone could be held, but the Chief of the Imperial Japanese Navy General Staff, Admiral Osami Nagano, was much less certain. The Imperial Japanese Navy planned to hold the national defense zone by defeating the United States fleet in a decisive battle.

== Implementation ==
The zone was to be held at all costs if Japan were to win the war. However, even after the Zone was established, the Navy remained fixated on securing points situated outside the designated zone—specifically during the battles in the Solomon Islands. Consequently, the construction of defensive fortifications within the designated zone was often relegated to a lower priority. This neglect extended even to Saipan Island—a critical strategic point where, if captured by U.S. forces, it would enable conventional air raids against the Japanese home islands using B-29 bombers.

In the case of Saipan, it was the Army's turn to remain fixated on its own operations in China (specifically, Operation Ichi-Go); as a result, the necessary strengthening of defensive capabilities did not proceed as planned, and the island ultimately fell to a U.S. invasion before its defensive infrastructure could be fully completed. Facing an American invasion force that outnumbered the Japanese garrison by two to one, Japanese soldiers—despite being woefully short on equipment and provisions—waged a desperate, unyielding struggle to the very end. Having already lost control of both the air and the sea—and having suffered crushing defeats in the battles for the Mariana and Palau Islands (most notably the Battle of the Philippine Sea and the Battle of Saipan)—Japan lost the Mariana Islands; consequently, all strategic preparations for future offensives were rendered futile, and Japan was forced onto the defensive.

With the breach of the "Absolute National Defense Zone," Japan's ultimate defeat became virtually inevitable; on July 18, 1944, Hideki Tōjō resigned as Prime Minister to accept responsibility for the outcome. Concurrently, Tōjō also stepped down from his post as Minister of the Army—a position he had held since before assuming the premiership. Thereafter, a campaign of air raids against the Japanese home islands commenced, carried out by B-29 bombers operating primarily from Tinian Island, located adjacent to Saipan.

== Criticism ==
Regarding this grand strategic concept, at the time of its announcement in 1943, Kumaichi Teramoto—Commander of the Fourth Air Army—remarked: "In September, the Operations Division of Imperial General Headquarters declared that they would draw a single line—dubbed the 'Absolute National Defense Zone'—extending from the Kuril Islands through the Mariana Islands to Western New Guinea, and vowed to defend it absolutely. But is this truly a line, or merely a series of points? [...] In short, without air superiority, all these locations simply become isolated points (solitary islands); they do not constitute a line. [...] Even a large island—if cut off from reinforcements and supplies—is reduced to nothing more than a solitary point within the vast expanse of the Pacific Ocean, serving merely as a place where soldiers happen to be stationed."

Similarly, Atsushi Ooi—who served as Chief of the War Guidance Section within the Naval General Staff at the time—recalled in the postwar period: "As was patently obvious to everyone, the key to any military operation was perceived to lie in air power. The primary reason we were currently struggling so desperately—suffering under intense pressure from the enemy along the front lines in Rabaul and the Solomon Islands—was precisely this: our own air power was insufficient. Furthermore, even if we were to retreat to a defensive line spanning the Marianas and Carolines, without adequate air power, there would be no realistic prospect of halting the enemy there either. To give this new defensive strategy a grandiose title like the 'Absolute National Defense Zone' is utterly futile; it would prove as useless as a tiger drawn on paper."
