= Robert B. Sheeks =

American intelligence officer in World War II

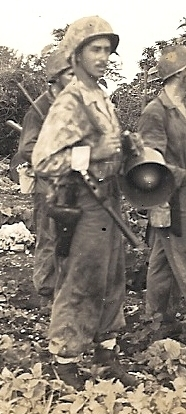
- Robert Sheeks on Saipan, 1944
- Born: 8 April 1922 Shanghai, China
- Died: 4 July 2022 (aged 100) Santa Rosa, California, U.S.
- Branch: United States Marine Corps
- Known for: Saving lives of civilians and Japanese soldiers

Robert Bruce Sheeks (April 8, 1922 – July 4, 2022) was an American combat intelligence and Japanese-language officer in the United States Marine Corps Reserve who played an important role in saving the lives of Japanese, Korean and Chamorro people during the invasions of Saipan and Tinian in June–August 1944.

Sheeks was born in Shanghai, China in 1922. He lived there during the Japanese invasion of Manchuria in 1931 and the 1932 Shanghai incident. In 1935, his family returned to the United States. In January 1942, Sheeks was recruited by the Office of Naval Intelligence after the attack on Pearl Harbor in World War II to become a Japanese-language and intelligence officer. During the invasion of Saipan in June 1944, Sheeks was one of a number of Japanese-language officers whose mission was focused on getting civilians and Japanese soldiers to surrender. He used innovative techniques to encourage surrender, including the use of jeep-mounted speakers and "surrender passes", which instructed Japanese soldiers how to surrender. The work of Sheeks and his fellow officers was responsible for convincing a large number of Japanese soldiers to surrender and saving thousands of civilian lives. Sheeks was awarded a Bronze Star Medal for his efforts in getting civilians and Japanese civilians to surrender.

For the remainder of the war, Sheeks spent much of his time overseeing the welfare of the civilians on Saipan. After the war, he was involved in projects in Asia, working for the U. S. Government, the Committee for a Free Asia, and the National Academy of Sciences. Later he created his own consulting firm that focused on economic development in Asia. He died on 4 July 2022.

Sheeks challenged the idea that Japanese civilians would fight to the death. In the last year of the war, he wrote an article responding to one written by the journalist Robert Sherrod, which implied that Japanese civilians would fight to the death or commit suicide. Sheeks argued against seeing the Japanese as inhuman fanatics who would choose suicide over surrender, pointing out that most civilians surrendered and the majority of those who died during the Battle of Saipan had been caught in the fighting between combatants.

== Early years ==
Sheeks was born on 8 April 1922 in Shanghai, China, where his father worked as a Ford Motor Company executive. He had one older brother, George; his mother died of cancer when he was 10 years old in 1932. During childhood, he learned to speak some Chinese. Sheeks was living in Shanghai when Japan invaded Manchuria in 1931, and lived through the 1932 Shanghai incident, witnessing the violence of its aftermath. Sheeks and his family returned to the United States in 1935 when he was 13 years old.

== World War II ==
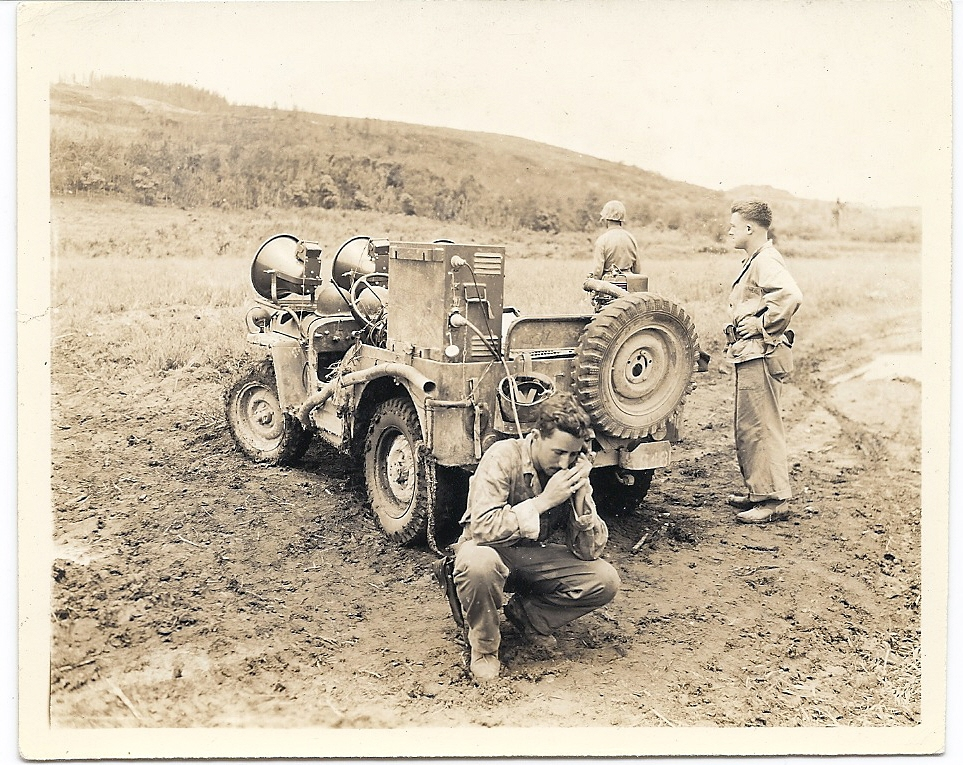
Sheeks testing his jeep-mounted speakers, Saipan 1944

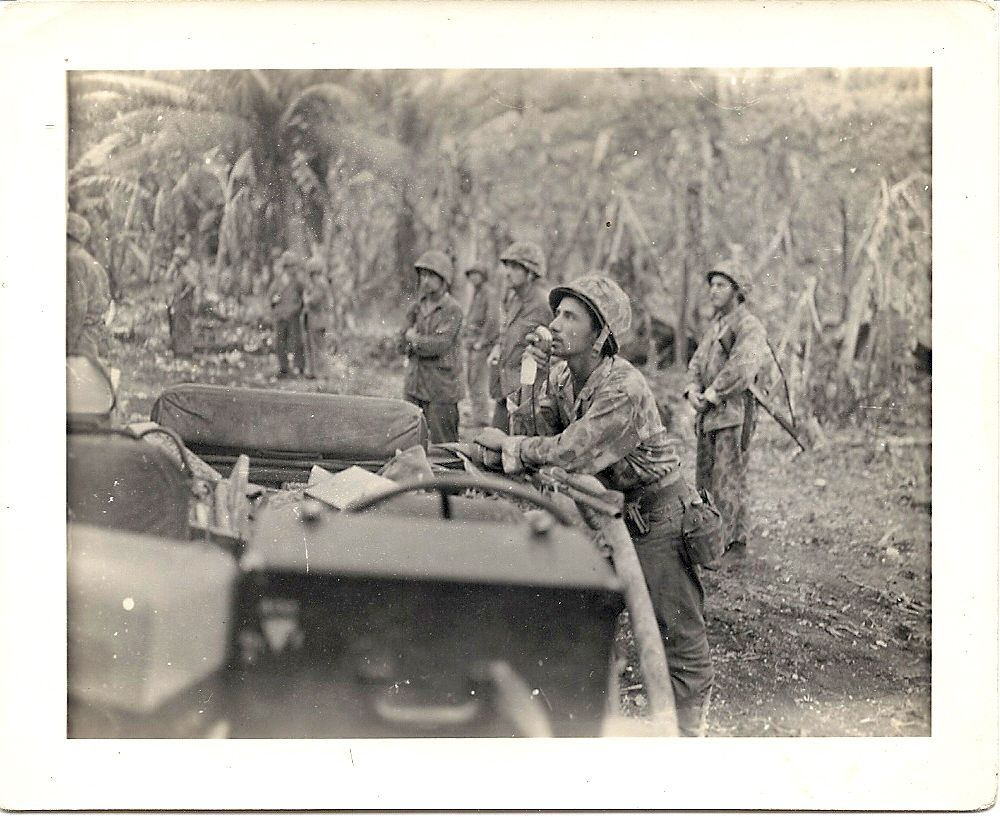
Sheeks using jeep-mounted speakers in the field, Saipan 1944

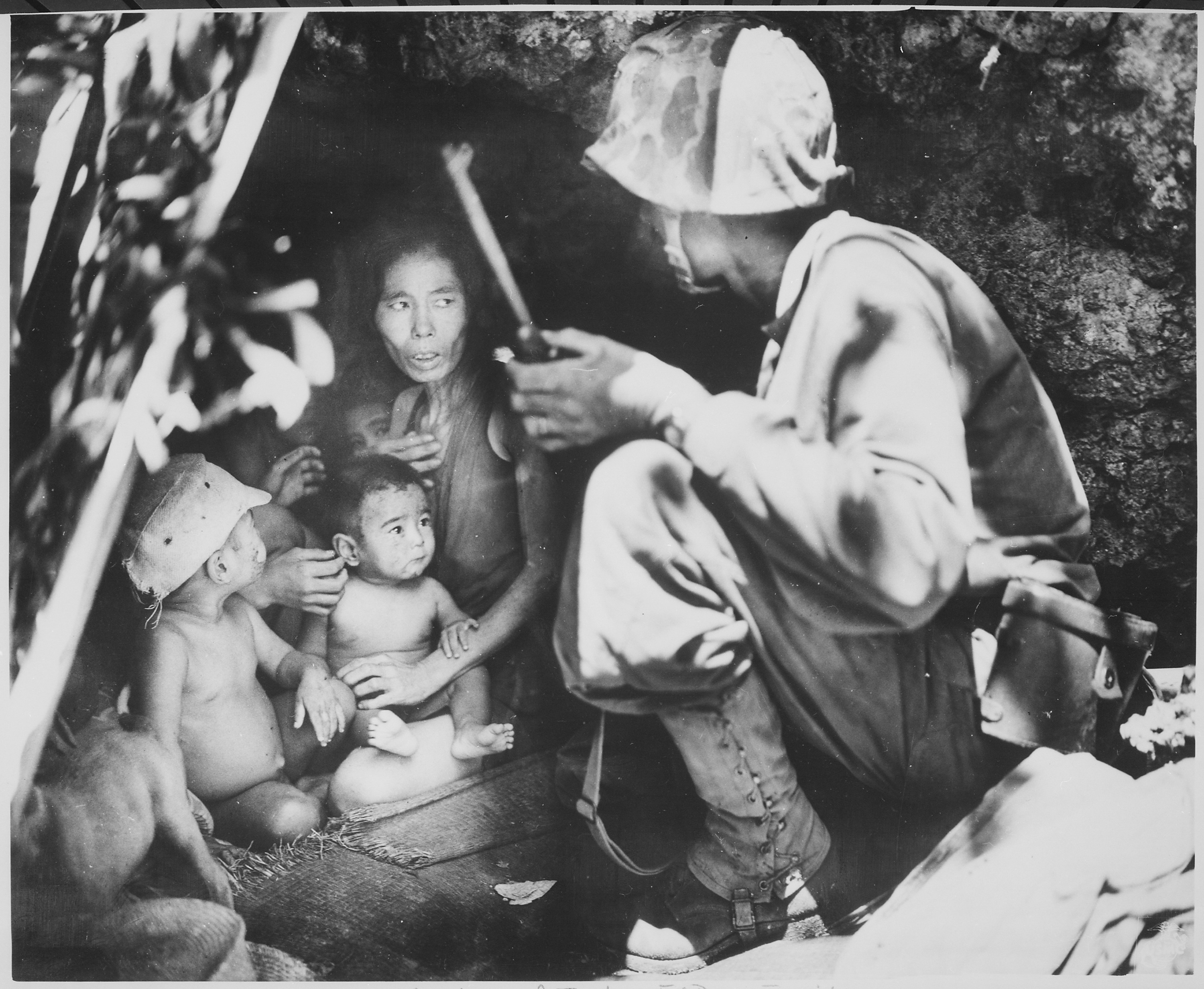
Sheeks talks a woman with children and a dog into leaving a hillside, June 21 on Saipan

Sheeks entered Harvard University in 1940 on a scholarship. During his third semester in January 1942, the month after the attack on Pearl Harbor, the Office of Naval Intelligence recruited him to become a Japanese-language and intelligence officer because they thought he might have some knowledge of kanji, which was common to both the Chinese and Japanese languages. Between February 1942 and January 1943, he received intensive instruction in Japanese through language immersion at the United States Navy Japanese Language School, which was taught by Nisei instructors. It was first located at the University of California, Berkeley but moved to University of Colorado, Boulder when the instructors were forced to evacuate the West Coast because of their Japanese ancestry.

After graduating from language school in January 1943, Sheeks was commissioned as a second lieutenant in the United States Marine Corps and assigned to Nouméa, New Caledonia to interrogate survivors of sunken Japanese submarines, from whom he gained intelligence about the new I–15-class submarines His first combat assignment was at the Battle of Tarawa in November 1943, where he carried out intelligence-gathering operations. In the battle, the Americans took very few prisoners, most were Korean laborers. Only 17 were Japanese soldiers, most of whom were badly wounded.

Sheeks's next assignment was Saipan, which had a large Japanese civilian population. He and his fellow Japanese-language officers had orders to collect intelligence and convince as many civilians as possible to surrender. Based his experience at Tarawa, Sheeks came to the conclusion that many Japanese did not understand how to surrender because of their military indoctrination, which emphasized an imperial cult loyal to the Japanese emperor that emphasized death over surrender. To address this problem, he and his fellow Japanese language officers created "Surrender Passes" in Japanese with instructions on how to surrender. The creation of these passes was not directly supported by the military but they got help before the invasion from The Honolulu Advertiser, who printed thousands free of charge. Sheeks also put together jeep-mounted loudspeakers, funding the project by diverting funds from the unused recreation budget of his unit, the 2nd Marine Division.

Sheeks landed on the beaches of Saipan with the first wave of the invasion. He and the other Japanese language officers used a combination of leaflets, speakers, and patrol work to convince people to surrender. The leaflets would be dropped out over enemy territories by artillery spotters who did it as a personal favor. The loudspeakers were more successful than many of the other methods, and eventually higher-ranked intelligence officers would urge that more units have them. Nevertheless, after Saipan, many American soldiers were skeptical about trying to get civilians and Japanese soldiers to surrender, but they let him try. When approaching a potential surrender group, he had the American soldiers put their rifles over their shoulders to avoid looking threatening, and sometimes approached them unarmed. If he wasn't successful, the Marines would continue their assault. Sheeks and his fellow Japanese-language officers not only saved civilian lives, but captured twice the Japanese soldiers than had been captured by U. S. Marines in the previous two years of the Pacific War. They also convinced many ordinary American soldiers that they did not have to kill every Japanese or civilian they encountered.

Sheeks participated in the Battle of Tinian, saving more civilians, and briefly worked with a Japanese soldier who had surrendered to get other soldiers to give themselves up. He returned to Saipan afterwards, where he and the other Japanese language officers effectively became civil affairs officers who had to oversee the internment camps that the civilians were put in. Once the civilians were separated from the Japanese soldiers, received medical care, and got shelter, they needed work. He convinced his superiors to allow them to work and to feed themselves by collective farming and fishing. The resultant fishing industry was able to feed the civilians, the Japanese prisoners of war, and supply fish to the military.

Soon after the battle, Sheeks tried to change public attitudes about the Japanese, contesting an article on the final days at Saipan by the journalist Robert Sherrod. In an article in Time Magazine, Sherrod had implied that almost every Japanese citizen would fight to the death rather than surrender, (Note: Sherrod wrote the editors of Time "The only phrase applicable to this war from now on is the ‘War of Extermination...That is why I stress the difficulty of fighting people who won't give up, and I am convinced no Japanese man, woman or child will give up this side of extermination.") using the image of the mass suicides that occurred in the last days of battle to make his point. Sheeks wrote an article in response arguing against the idea that Japanese civilians were inhuman fanatics, who would fight to the last person. He pointed out that most civilians surrendered. Suicides accounted for only a minority of deaths, and most of the deaths were due to the fighting between combatants. Because the military didn't want to publish a work contradicting Sherrod, Sheek's article wasn't released for publication until May 1945. The battles of Peleliu and Iwo Jima, in which less than four percent of the Japanese soldiers surrendered and the Americans suffered a high casualty rate, made Sheeks's message unpopular.

Three of the Japanese language officers–Lieutenants Sheeks, Charles T. Cross, and Raymond V. Luthy–were awarded a Bronze Star Medal for their work in broadcasting surrender instructions and rescuing civilians. They, along with others such Army Technical Sergeant Hoichi Kubo and Marine Corporal Guy Gabaldon, collectively saved thousands of civilians. Sheeks later commented that he was "one of the few people who was decorated during the war in the Pacific for saving enemy lives."

== Post-War Years ==
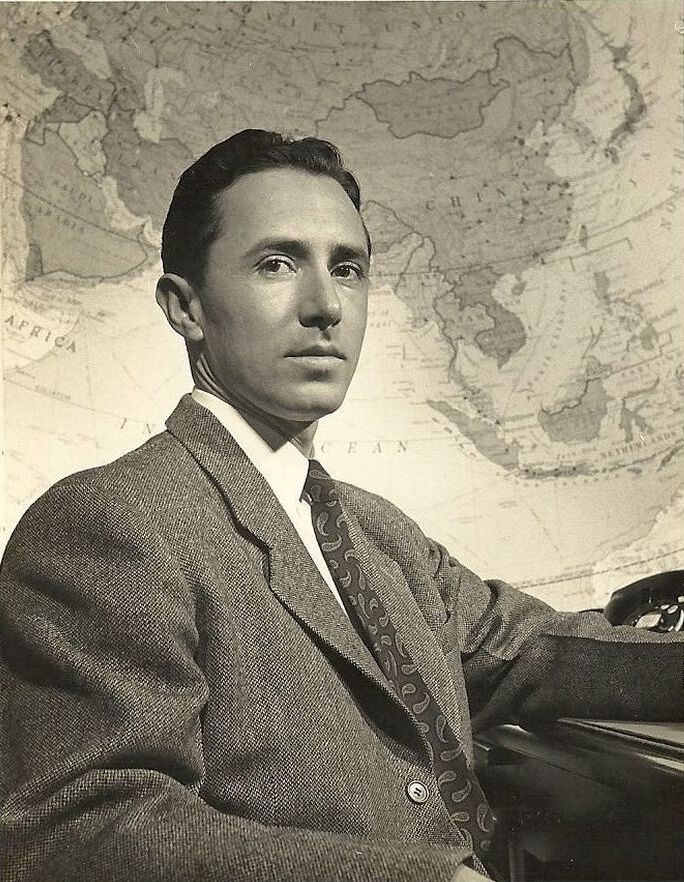
Sheeks in 1952

After the war, Sheeks retired from active duty, but remained in the United States Marine Corps Reserve, eventually earning the rank of major. He returned to Harvard to complete his bachelor's degree. In 1948, he earned his master's degree in China regional studies. He became a civilian analyst for the U. S. government during the final collapse of the Chinese Kuomintang government at the end of the Chinese Communist Revolution. During that time, he worked in mainland China and then moved to Taiwan He later worked for the Committee for a Free Asia in Southeast Asia. He also worked for the National Academy of Sciences to promote scientific cooperation in Asia, and became a private consultant for developing resources in Asia. Sheeks died on 4 July 2022.

== Bibliography ==
Books and journal articles

- Astroth, Alexander (2019). Mass Suicides on Saipan and Tinian, 1944: An Examination of the Civilian Deaths in Historical Context. McFarland. ISBN 9781476674568. OCLC 1049791315.
- Boomhower, Ray E. (2017). Dispatches from the Pacific: The World War II Reporting of Robert L. Sherrod. Indiana University Press. ISBN 9780253029607. OCLC 991535997.
- Borrowman, Jerry (2017). "Robert Sheeks: Saving Enemy Civilians and Soldiers in the Pacific". Compassionate Soldier : Remarkable True Stories of Mercy, Heroism, and Honor from the Battlefield. Shadow Mountain. pp. 93–107. ISBN 9781629722924. OCLC 1391286167.
- Dingman, Roger (2009). Deciphering the Rising Sun: Navy and Marine Corps Codbreakers, Translators, and Interpreters in the Pacific War. Naval Institute Press. ISBN 9781591142119. OCLC 859252011.
- Dingman, Roger (2004). "Language at War: U.S. Marine Corps Japanese Language Officers in the Pacific War". Journal of Military History. 68 (3): 853–883. JSTOR 3396730.
- Hallas, James H. (2019). Saipan: The Battle That Doomed Japan in World War II. Stackpole. ISBN 9780811768436. OCLC 1052877312.
- Hoyt, Edwin P. (1986). Japan's War : The Great Pacific Conflict, 1853 to 1952. McGraw-Hill. ISBN 0070306125. OCLC 1150117881.
- Meehl, Gerald A. (2012). One Marine's War : A Combat Interpreter's Quest for Humanity in the Pacific. Naval Institute Press. ISBN 9781612510927. OCLC 811408315.
- Smith, Rex A.; Meehl, Gerald A. (2002). Pacific Legacy: Image and Memory from World War II in the Pacific. Abbeville Press. ISBN 9780789207616. OCLC 1409455818.
- Toll, Ian W. (2015). The Conquering Tide: War in the Pacific Islands, 1942–1944. W. W. Norton. ISBN 978-0393080643. OCLC 902661305.

Online Sources

- "Obituary: Major Robert Bruce Sheeks". Daniels Chapel of the Roses Funeral Home and Crematory. 2022. Archived from the original on 18 Feb 2024.

Primary Sources

- Sheeks, Robert B. (1945). "Civilians in Saipan". Far Eastern Survey. 14 (2): 109–113. doi:10.2307/3022063. JSTOR 3022063.
- Sherrod, Robert L. (24 July 1944). "World Battlefronts: Battle of the Pacific: Last Charge". Time Magazine.
