= Battle of Saipan =

1944 battle during the Pacific Campaign of World War II

Coordinates: 15°11′N 145°45′E

- Part of the Mariana and Palau Islands campaign of the Pacific Theater (World War II)
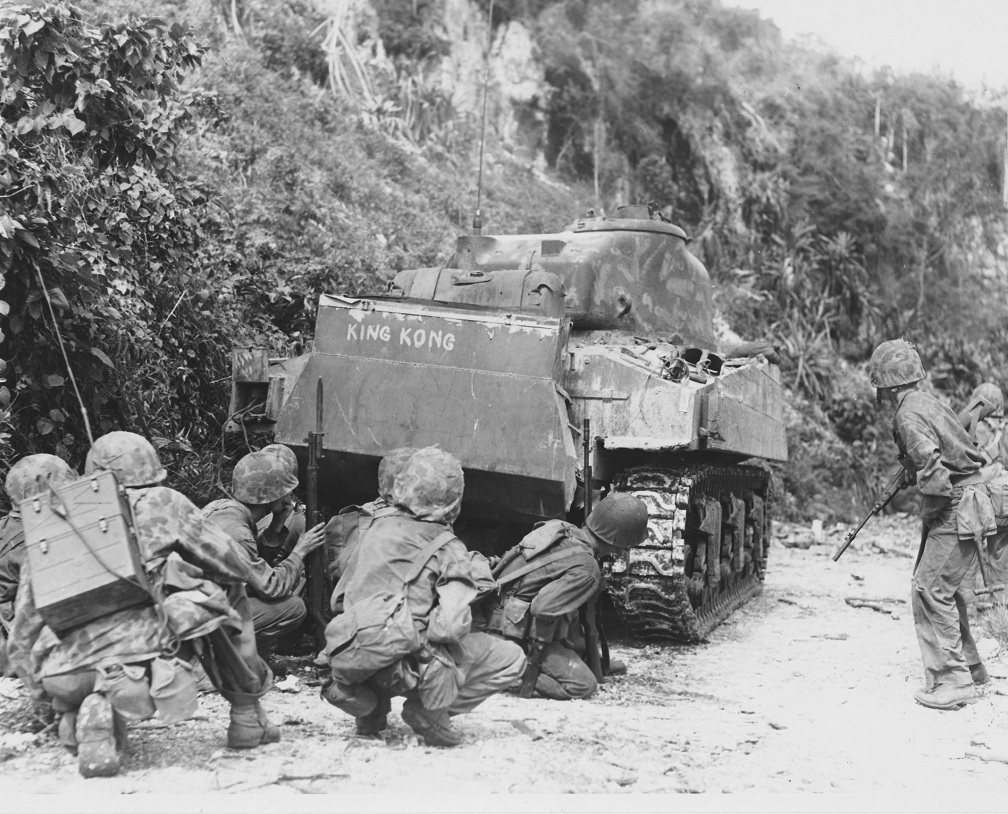
- Marines take cover behind an M4 Sherman tank while clearing Japanese forces in northern Saipan, 8 July 1944.
Date	15 June – 9 July 1944 (24 days)
Location	Saipan, Mariana Islands
Result	American victory

Belligerents
United States	Japan

Commanders and leaders
Chester W. Nimitz; Raymond Spruance; Richmond K. Turner; Holland Smith	Hideyoshi Obata; Yoshitsugu Saitō ‡‡; Chūichi Nagumo ‡‡

Units involved
V Amphibious Corps	31st Army

Strength
Assault: 71,034; Garrison: 23,616; Total: 94,650	Army: 25,469; Navy: 6,160; Total: 31,629

Casualties and losses
Land forces 3,100–3,225 killed 326 missing 13,061–13,099 wounded Ships' personnel 51+ killed 32+ missing 184+ wounded	25,144+ dead (buried by 15 August); 1,810 prisoners (as of 10 August); Remaining ~5,000 committed suicide, killed/captured later, or holding out
- 8,000–10,000 civilian deaths

The Battle of Saipan was an amphibious assault launched by the United States against the Empire of Japan during the Pacific campaign of World War II between 15 June and 9 July 1944. The initial invasion triggered the Battle of the Philippine Sea, which effectively destroyed Japanese carrier-based airpower, and the battle resulted in the American capture of the island. Its occupation put the major cities of the Japanese home islands within the range of B-29 bombers, making them vulnerable to strategic bombing by the United States Army Air Forces. It also precipitated the resignation of Hideki Tōjō, the prime minister of Japan.

Saipan was the first objective in Operation Forager, the campaign to occupy the Mariana Islands that got underway at the same time the Allies were invading France in Operation Overlord. After a two-day naval bombardment, the U.S. 2nd Marine Division, 4th Marine Division, and the Army's 27th Infantry Division, commanded by Lieutenant General Holland Smith, landed on the island and defeated the 43rd Infantry Division of the Imperial Japanese Army, commanded by Lieutenant General Yoshitsugu Saitō. Organized resistance ended when at least 3,000 Japanese soldiers died in a mass gyokusai attack, and afterward about 1,000 civilians committed suicide.

The capture of Saipan pierced the Japanese inner defense perimeter, and forced the Japanese government to inform its citizens for the first time that the war was not going well. The battle claimed more than 46,000 military casualties and at least 8,000 civilian deaths. The high percentage of casualties suffered during the battle influenced American planning for future assaults, including the projected invasion of Japan.

== Background ==
=== American strategic objectives ===
Map showing strategic implication of Saipan's fall: Japanese Absolute National Defense Zone would be pierced and the Japanese home islands be within the 1,600 mi (2,600 km) range of the B-29 bomber

Up to early 1944, Allied operations against the Japanese military in the Pacific were focused on securing the lines of communication between Australia and the United States. These operations had recaptured the Solomon Islands, eastern New Guinea, western New Britain, the Admiralty Islands, and the Gilbert and Marshall Islands.

To defeat Japan, Admiral Ernest J. King, Commander in Chief, United States Fleet, sought to execute War Plan Orange, which the Naval War College had been developing for four decades in the event of a war. The plan envisioned an offensive through the Central Pacific that originated from Hawaii, island-hopped through Micronesia and the Philippines, forced a decisive battle with the Japanese Navy, and brought about an economic collapse of Japan.

As early as the Casablanca Conference in January 1943, King presented the case to the Combined Chiefs of Staff for an amphibious offensive in the Central Pacific – including the Marshall Islands and Truk – that would capture the Mariana Islands. He stated that the occupation of the Marianas – specifically Saipan, Tinian, and Guam – would cut the sea and air route from the Japanese home islands to the western Pacific, but the Combined Chiefs of Staff made no commitment at the time. General Douglas MacArthur, Supreme Commander of Allied Forces in the Southwest Pacific Area, objected to King's proposed Central Pacific offensive. He argued that it would be costly and time-consuming and would pull resources away from his drive in the Southwest Pacific toward the Philippines.

At the Quebec Conference in August 1943, King continued to advocate for including the Marianas in a Central Pacific offensive. He suggested that the strategic importance of the Marianas could draw the main Japanese fleet out for a major naval battle. King's advocacy gained support from General Henry H. Arnold, Chief of the Army Air Forces, who wanted to use the newly developed B-29 bomber. The Marianas could provide secure airfields to sustain a strategic bombing offensive as the islands put much of Japan's population centers and industrial areas within the B-29's 1,600 mi (2,600 km) mile combat radius. At the Cairo Conference in November 1943, the Combined Chiefs of Staff supported both MacArthur's offensive in the Southwest Pacific and King's in the Central Pacific, adding the Marianas as an objective for the Central Pacific offensive and setting 1 October 1944 as the date for their invasion.

Map of Saipan showing the progress of the battle

Admiral Chester Nimitz, Commander-in-Chief, Pacific Ocean Areas, led the Central Pacific offensive. In January–February 1944, the Marshall Islands were quickly captured and a massive American carrier-based air attack on Truk demonstrated that it could be neutralized and bypassed. On 12 March 1944, the Joint Chiefs of Staff moved the date of the invasion up to 15 June with the goal of creating airfields for B-29s and developing secondary naval bases. Nimitz updated the plans for the Central Pacific offense, codenamed Granite II, and set the invasion of the Marianas, codenamed Forager, as its initial objective. Saipan would be the first assault.

=== Japanese strategic plan ===
The Japanese Imperial War Council established the "Absolute National Defense Zone", Zettai Kokubōken) in September 1943, which was bounded by southern half of Sakhalin and the Kuril Islands, the Bonin Islands, the Marianas, Western New Guinea, Malaya, and Burma. This line was to be held at all costs if Japan were to win the war. The Marianas were considered particularly important to protect, as their capture would put Japan within bombing range of the B-29 bomber and allow the Americans to interdict the supply routes between the Japanese home islands and the western Pacific.

The Imperial Japanese Navy planned to hold the defense line by defeating the United States fleet in a single decisive battle, after which, the Americans were expected to negotiate for peace. The Japanese Submarine Fleet (6th Fleet), commanded by Vice Admiral Takeo Takagi, whose headquarters was on Saipan, would screen the line. Any American attempt to breach this line was to serve as the trigger to start the battle. The defense forces in the attacked area would attempt to hold their positions, while the Japanese Combined Fleet struck the Americans, sinking their carriers with land-based aircraft and finishing the fleet off with surface ships. As part of this plan, the Japanese could deploy over 500 land-based planes – 147 of them immediately in the Marianas – that made up the 1st Air Fleet under the command of Vice Admiral Kakuji Kakuta, whose headquarters were on Tinian.

== History and geography ==
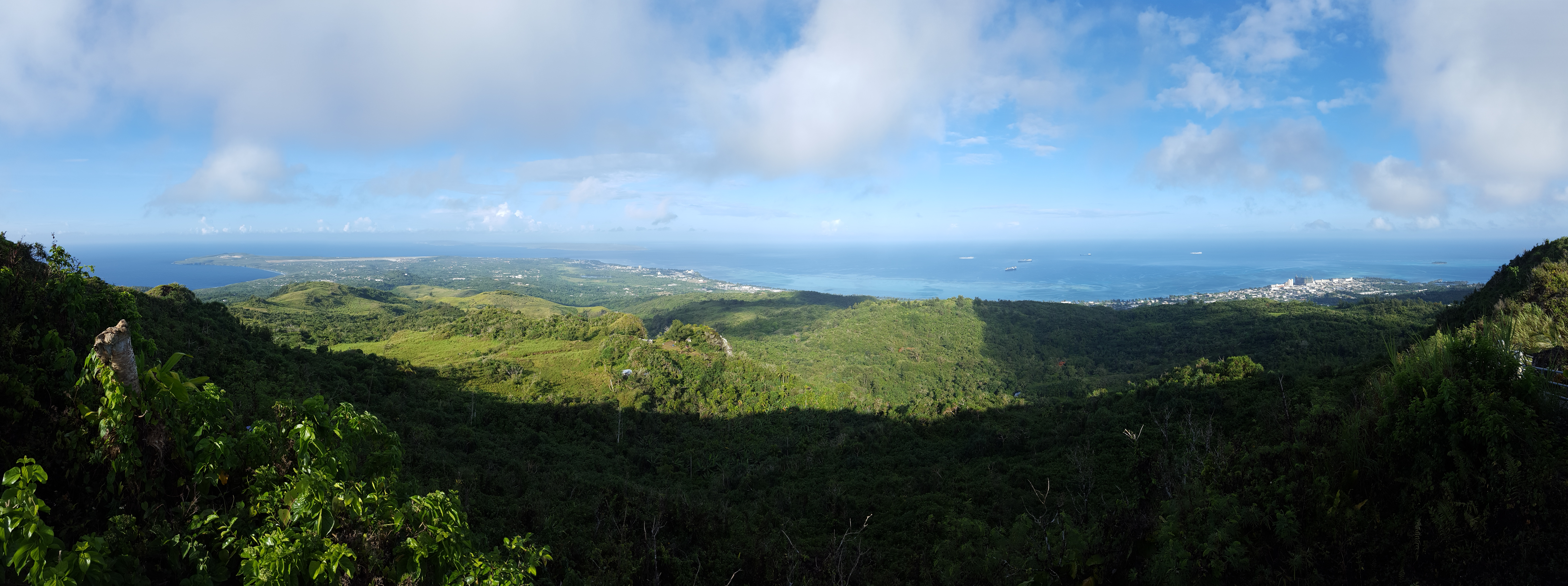
Panorama from Mount Tapotchau looking southwest, 2017: Aslito Field is on the left, Charan Kanoa and invasion beaches are left of center, and Garapan is on the right

Saipan and the other Mariana Islands were claimed as Spanish possessions by conquistador Miguel López de Legazpi in 1565. After Spain's defeat in the Spanish-American War, Saipan was sold to Germany in 1899. The island was occupied by the Japanese in 1914 during World War I, who made it the administrative center for the Mariana Islands – Saipan, Tinian, and Rota – that were part of Japan's South Seas Mandate.

Saipan has a tropical marine climate with a mean annual temperature of 85 °F (29 °C) in the lowlands and 78 °F (26 °C) in the highlands. Though the island has a mean rainfall between 81 inches (210 cm) and 91 inches (230 cm) per year, the rainy season does not begin until July. Unlike the small, flat coral atolls of the Gilberts and Marshalls, Saipan is a volcanic island with diverse terrain well suited for defense. It is approximately 47 sq mi (122 km^{2}), (Note: Post-war estimates range from 46 square miles to 48. Hallas 2019, p. 479, fn 5 points out that most historians describing the battle state that the island is substantially larger. For example, McManus 2021, p. 339, Shaw, Nalty & Turnbladh 1989, p. 238 state that it is 72, Goldberg 2007, p. 38 says 75, and Crowl 1993, p. 29 says 85 square miles.) and has a volcanic core surrounded by limestone. In the center of the island is Mount Tapotchau, which rises to 1,554 ft (474 m). From the mountain, a high ridge ran northward about 7 miles (11 km) to Mount Marpi. This area was filled with caves and ravines concealed by forest and brush, and the mountainous terrain would force tanks to stay on the island's few roads, which were poorly constructed.

The principal airfield of the Marianas, Aslito Field, was located on the southern half of the island. It served as a repair stop and transit hub for Japanese aircraft headed toward other parts of the Pacific. This half of the island was flatter, but covered with sugarcane fields because the island's economy became focused on sugar production after the Japanese government had taken over Saipan from Germany in 1914. About 70% of Saipan's acreage was dedicated to sugarcane. It was so plentiful that a narrow-gauge railway was built around the perimeter of the island to facilitate its transportation. These cane fields were an obstacle to attackers; they were difficult to maneuver in and provided concealment for the defenders.

Saipan was the first island during the Pacific War where the United States forces encountered a substantial Japanese civilian population, and the first where U. S. Marines fought around urban areas. About 26,000 to 28,000 civilians lived on the island, primarily serving the sugar industry. Most of them were Japanese subjects, primarily from Okinawa and Korea; a minority was Chamorro people. The largest towns on the island were the administrative center of Garapan, which had a population of 10,000, Charan Kanoa, and Tanapag. They were on the western coast of the island, which was where the best landing beaches for an invasion were located.

== Opposing forces ==
=== American invasion force ===
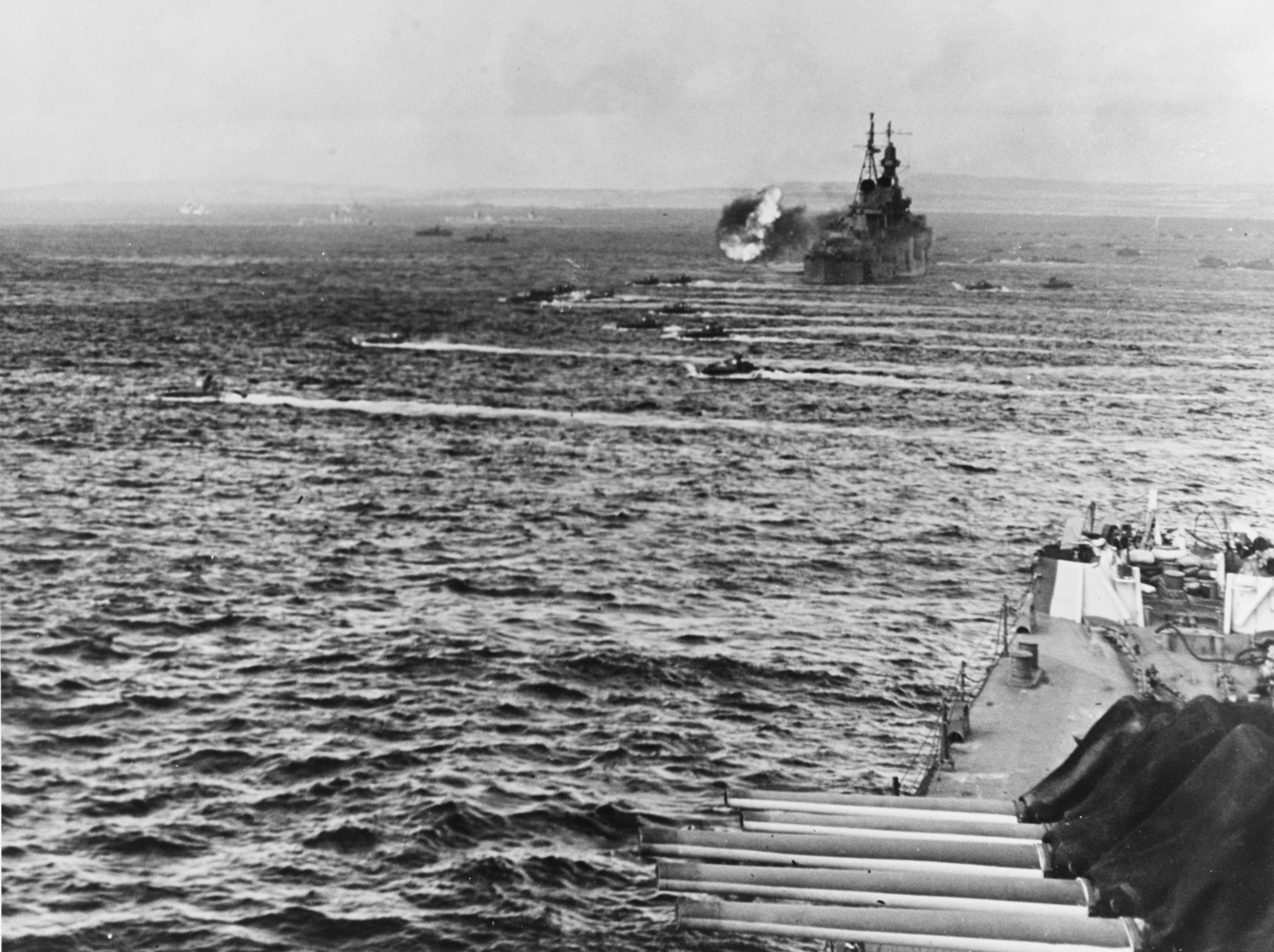
LVTs heading for shore on 15 June. Birmingham in foreground; the cruiser firing in the distance is Indianapolis

Nimitz, the commander of the Pacific Fleet, assigned Admiral Raymond Spruance, commander of the Fifth Fleet, to oversee the operation. Vice Admiral Richmond K. Turner, Commander, Joint Amphibious Forces (Task Force 51) oversaw the overall organization of the amphibious landings of the Mariana Islands; he also oversaw the tactical command of the landing on Saipan as Commander, Northern Attack Force (TF 52). Once the amphibious landings were completed, Lieutenant General Holland M. Smith, Commanding General, Expeditionary Troops (Task Force 56), would oversee the ground forces for all of Forager; he would also oversee the ground combat on Saipan as Commander, Northern Troops and Landing Force.

The Northern Troops and Landing Force was built around the V Amphibious Corps, which consisted of the 2nd Marine Division commanded by Major General Thomas E. Watson and 4th Marine Division commanded by Major General Harry Schmidt. The 27th Infantry Division commanded by Major General Ralph C. Smith was held as the Expeditionary Troops reserve for use anywhere in the Marianas. Over 60,000 troops were assigned to the assault. (Note: Crowl 1993, p. 36 puts the total at 66,779; Shaw, Nalty & Turnbladh 1989, p. 253 put it at 71,034) Approximately 22,000 were in each Marine division and 16,500 were in the 27th Infantry Division.

The invasion fleet, consisting of over 500 ships and 300,000 men, (Note: Morison 1981, pp. 160–162 puts the number of ships at 535 and mentions that the four and a half divisions of ground combat troops numbered 127,571; Toll 2015, p. 457 puts the number of ships at 600 and the number of men at 600,000, which may include naval personnel.) got underway days before the Allied forces in Europe invaded France in Operation Overlord on 6 June 1944. It was launched from Hawaii, briefly stopping at Eniwetok and Kwajalein before heading for Saipan. The Marine divisions left Pearl Harbor on 19–31 May and met at Eniwetok on 7–8 June; the 27th Infantry Division left Pearl Harbor on 25 May and arrived at Kwajalein on 9 June. The 15 aircraft carriers of the Fast Carrier Task Force (Task Force 58) commanded by Vice Admiral Marc A. Mitscher, which would provide support for the invasion, left Majuro for Saipan on 6 June.

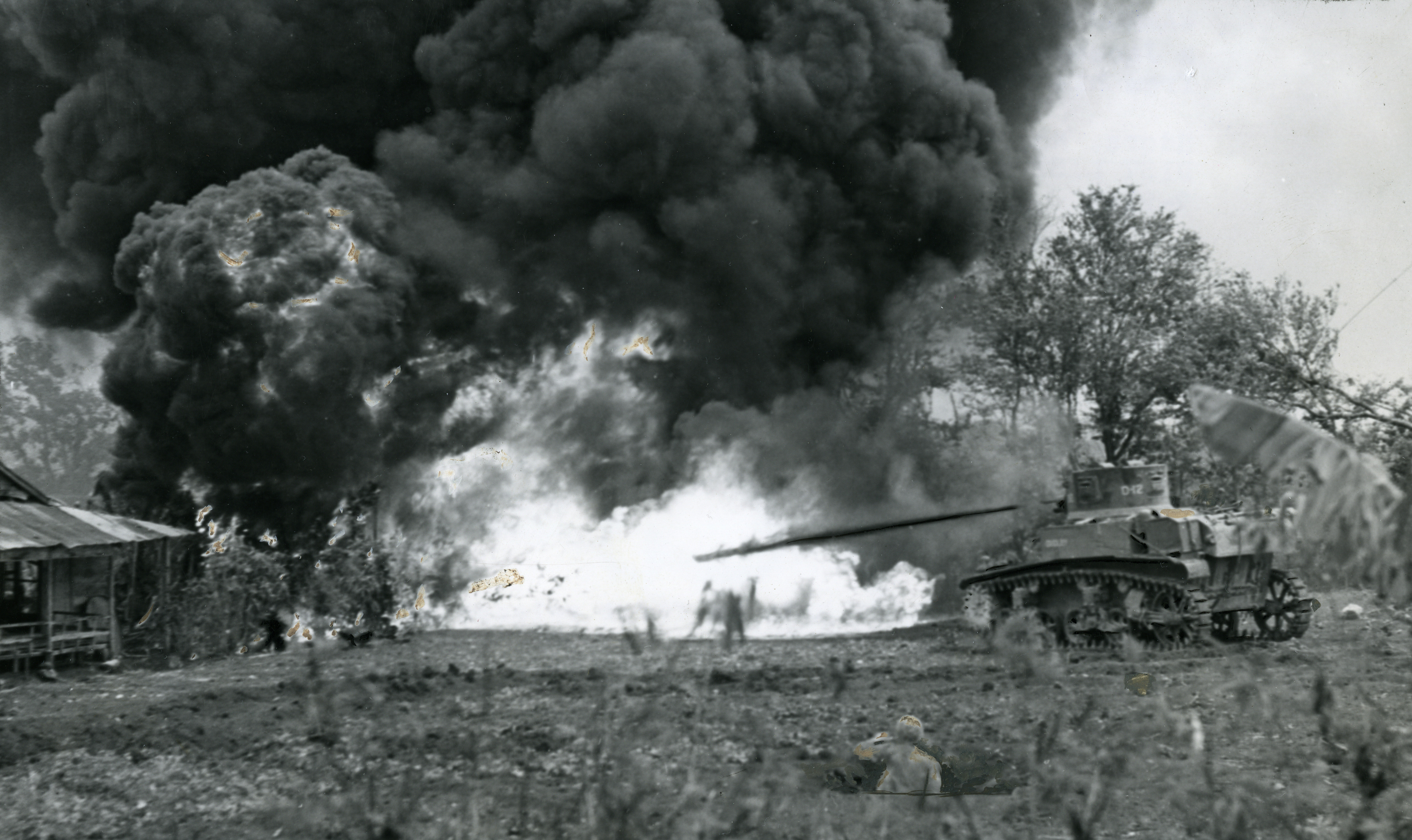
A "Satan", an M3 Stuart tank with a Ronson flamethrower, incinerates a Japanese pillbox on Saipan, June 1944.

The invasion force included 150 tanks, over 100 of which were M4 Shermans. The M4 Sherman tank was superior to the medium tank used by the Japanese, the Type 97. Shermans were primarily used to support infantry and was considered one of the most effective weapons for destroying enemy emplacements. Flamethrowers were extensively used. Smith had seen the need for motorized flamethrowers and had requested that the Army's Chemical Warfare Service (CWS) in Hawaii install them in M3 Stuart tanks. Seabees with the CWS had 24 tanks, nicknamed "Satans", converted to flamethrowing in time for the invasion. They were very effective for destroying pillboxes, cave defenses, buildings, cane fields, and brush.

=== Japanese defense preparations ===
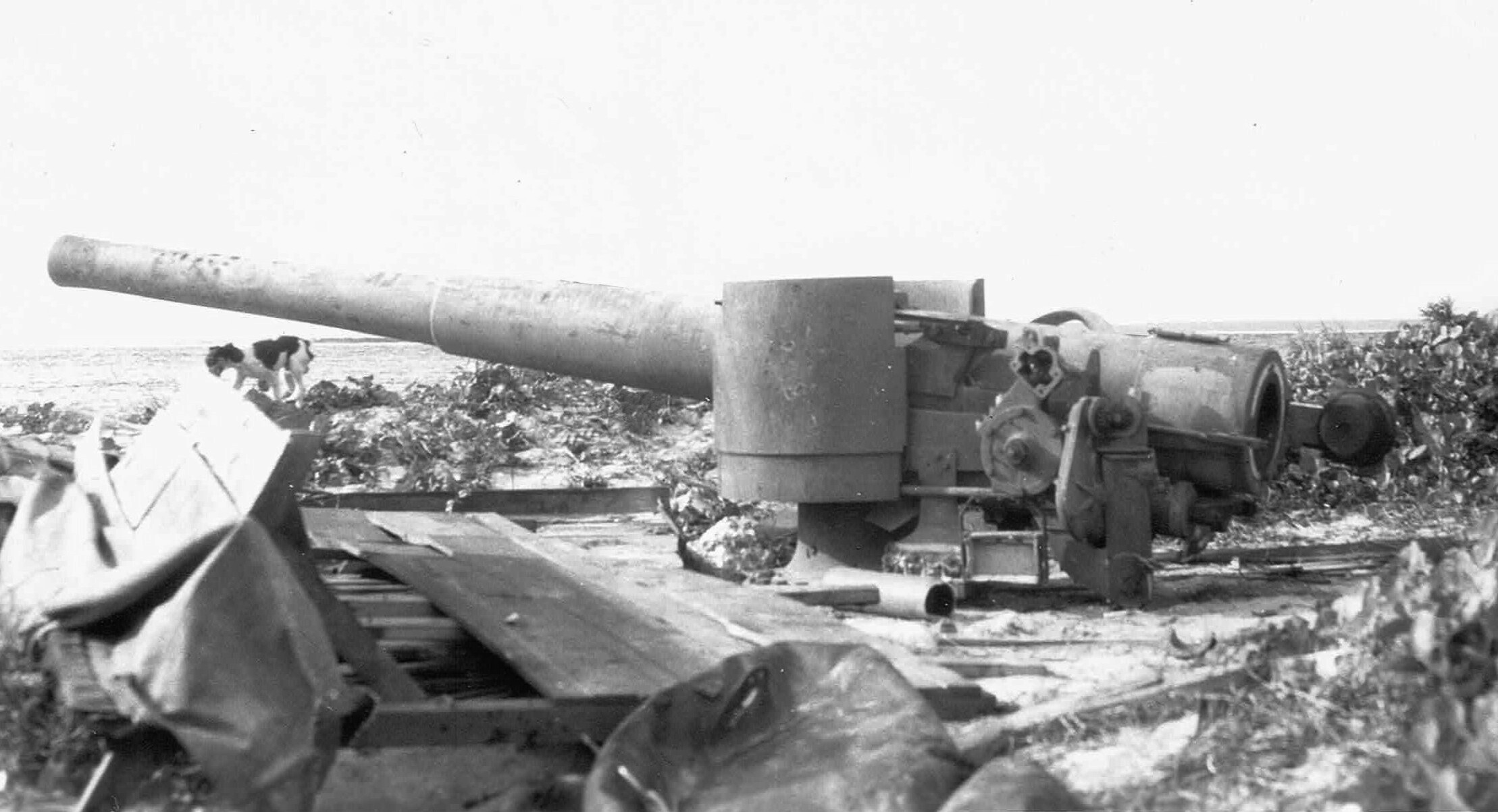
Japanese 6-inch (152 mm) coastal defense gun found on Saipan after the battle

American intelligence had estimated that there would be between 15,000 and 18,000 Japanese troops on Saipan at the time of the invasion. In actuality, there were double that number. Nearly 32,000 Japanese military personnel were on the island, including 6,000 naval troops. The two major army units defending the island were the 43rd Division commanded by Lieutenant General Yoshitsugu Saitō and the 47th Independent Mixed Brigade commanded by Colonel Yoshira Oka. Both units were assigned to the Thirty-First Army under the overall command of Lieutenant General Hideyoshi Obata.

The Japanese hurriedly reinforced the island before the invasion, but many of the troop transports were sunk by U.S. submarines. For example, five of the seven ships transporting the 43rd Division were sunk. Most of the troops were saved, but the majority of their equipment–including hats and shoes–was lost, reducing their effectiveness. Many soldiers were the stranded survivors of sunken ships headed to other islands. About 80 tanks were on the island, substantially more than the Americans had encountered in previous battles with the Japanese.

Japanese defensive doctrine sought to destroy an invading force when it was most vulnerable, at the shoreline before the invaders were able to form a beachhead, and most of their defenses focused on the most likely invasion locations, the western beaches south of Garapan. The original plans also called for a defense in depth that fortified the entire island, but the Japanese were unable to complete their defenses by the time of the invasion. Much of the building material sent to Saipan, such as concrete and steel, had been sunk in transit by American submarines, and the timing of the invasion surprised the Japanese, who thought they had until November to complete their defense. As of June, many fortifications remained incomplete, available building materials were left unused, and many artillery guns were not properly deployed. This left the island's interior defenses weak. If an invading force broke through the beach defenses, no organized fallback position remained; the Japanese troops would have to rely on Saipan's rough terrain, especially its caves, for protection.

Japanese leadership on the island suffered from poor command coordination. Although Vice Admiral Chūichi Nagumo, Commander of the Central Pacific Area Fleet, had nominal oversight of the defenses in the Central Pacific, Obata refused to subordinate his army command to a naval officer. Because Obata was on Guam and away from his Saipan headquarters when the invasion started, command of Saipan's army units fell to Saitō, who was the senior army officer on the island. Obata's chief of staff, Major General Keiji Igeta, maintained a separate headquarters that was often out of touch with Saitō.

== Battle ==
=== 11–14 June: Preparatory attacks ===
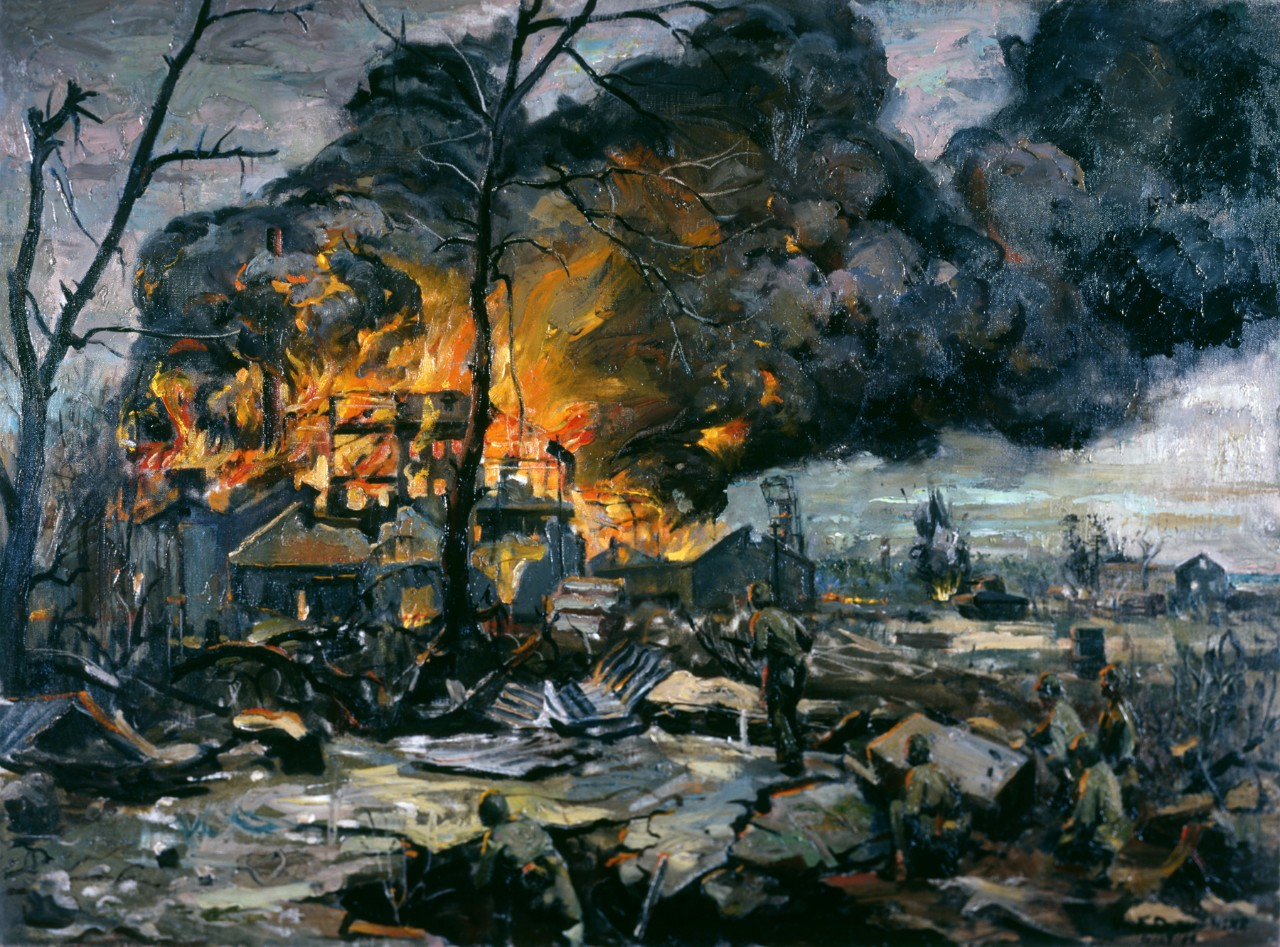
Inferno, a 1944 oil painting by William Franklin Draper of the destruction of the sugar mill at Charan Kanoa on 15 June (Navy Art Collection, Naval History and Heritage Command)

On 11 June, over 200 F6F Hellcats from the Fast Carrier Task Force launched a surprise attack on Japanese airfields in Saipan and Tinian, putting roughly 130 Japanese aircraft out of operation at the cost of 11 American aircraft. The attack destroyed most of the 1st Air Fleet's land-based planes that had been deployed to defend the Marianas, and gave the Americans air superiority over Saipan. Planes from the task force continued their attacks until 14 June, harassing fields, bombing military targets, and burning cane fields on the southern half of Saipan. By the end of the week, the 1st Air Fleet had been reduced to about 100 aircraft.

On 13 June, seven fast battleships and 11 destroyers under Vice Admiral Willis Lee began the naval bombardment of Saipan. Most of these battleships' crews had not been trained in shore bombardment, and the ships fired from more than 5.5 miles (8.9 km) to avoid potential minefields. The bombardment damaged much of Garapan and Charan Kanoa, but it was relatively ineffective at destroying the island's defenses. The following day, seven older battleships, 11 cruisers, and 26 destroyers commanded by Rear Admiral Jesse B. Oldendorf continued the shelling. These crews were trained in shore bombardment, and moved closer to shore because the sea was found to be free of mines. This bombardment eliminated many emplaced antiaircraft positions, but it, too, failed to destroy most of the beach defenses.

=== 15 June: D-Day ===
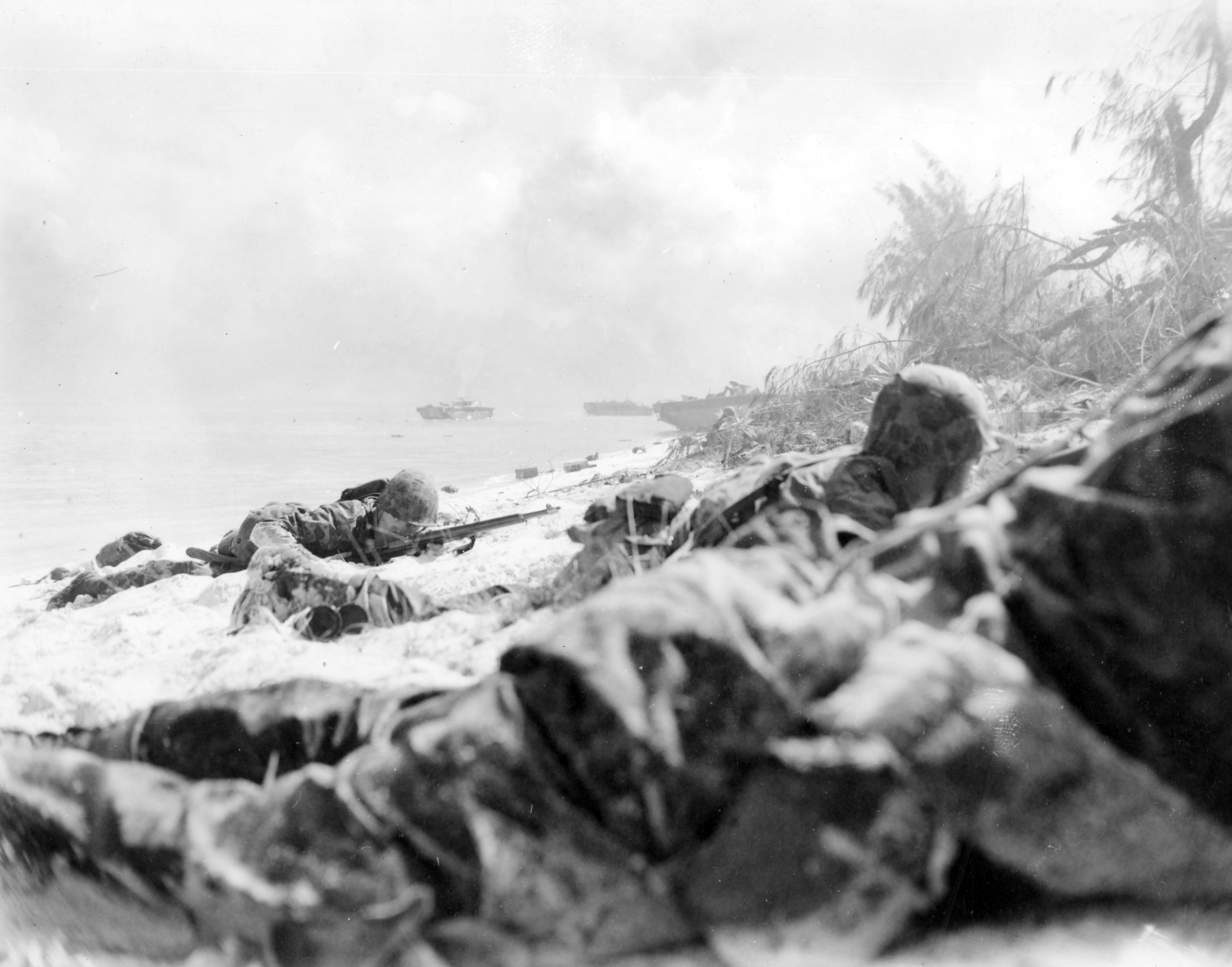
Marines hug the beach under enemy fire.

The D-Day for the amphibious landing was 15 June, beginning around 08:40. Naval and aerial bombardments in preparation for the landings began earlier in the morning, disrupting the Japanese communications network. The guns of the warships provided continuous supporting fire throughout the day.

The V Amphibious Corps landed on the southwest beaches of Saipan. The 2nd Marine Division landed on two beaches, named Red and Green, of Charan Kanoa, and the 4th Marine Division landed on the beaches named Blue and Yellow, south of the town. Approximately 700 amphibious vehicles participated in the assault, including 393 amphibious tractors (LVTs) and 140 amphibious tanks. Within 20 minutes, around 8,000 men were on the beaches.

The beaches were fortified by trenches and a few pillboxes, but the landings were mainly contested by constant and intensive fire by Japanese artillery, mortars, and machine guns. The Japanese had concentrated at least 50 large artillery pieces on the high ground—including at least 24 105-mm howitzers and 30 75-mm field pieces—around the invasion beaches. Many were deployed on reverse slopes, and pennants had been placed on the beach for accurate ranging. The Americans suffered over 2,000 casualties, (Note: McManus 2021, p. 350 estimates 2,500, Heinrichs & Gallicchio 2017, p. 95 put the estimate near 3,500. In his after-battle report, Major General Harry Schmidt, Commander of the 4th Marine Division, put the casualties for the first two days at 3,500, which is about 20% of the casualties suffered during the entire battle.) the majority was due to the artillery and mortar fire. Additionally, 164 amphibious tractors and amphibious tanks, about 40% of those engaged during the day, had been destroyed or damaged.

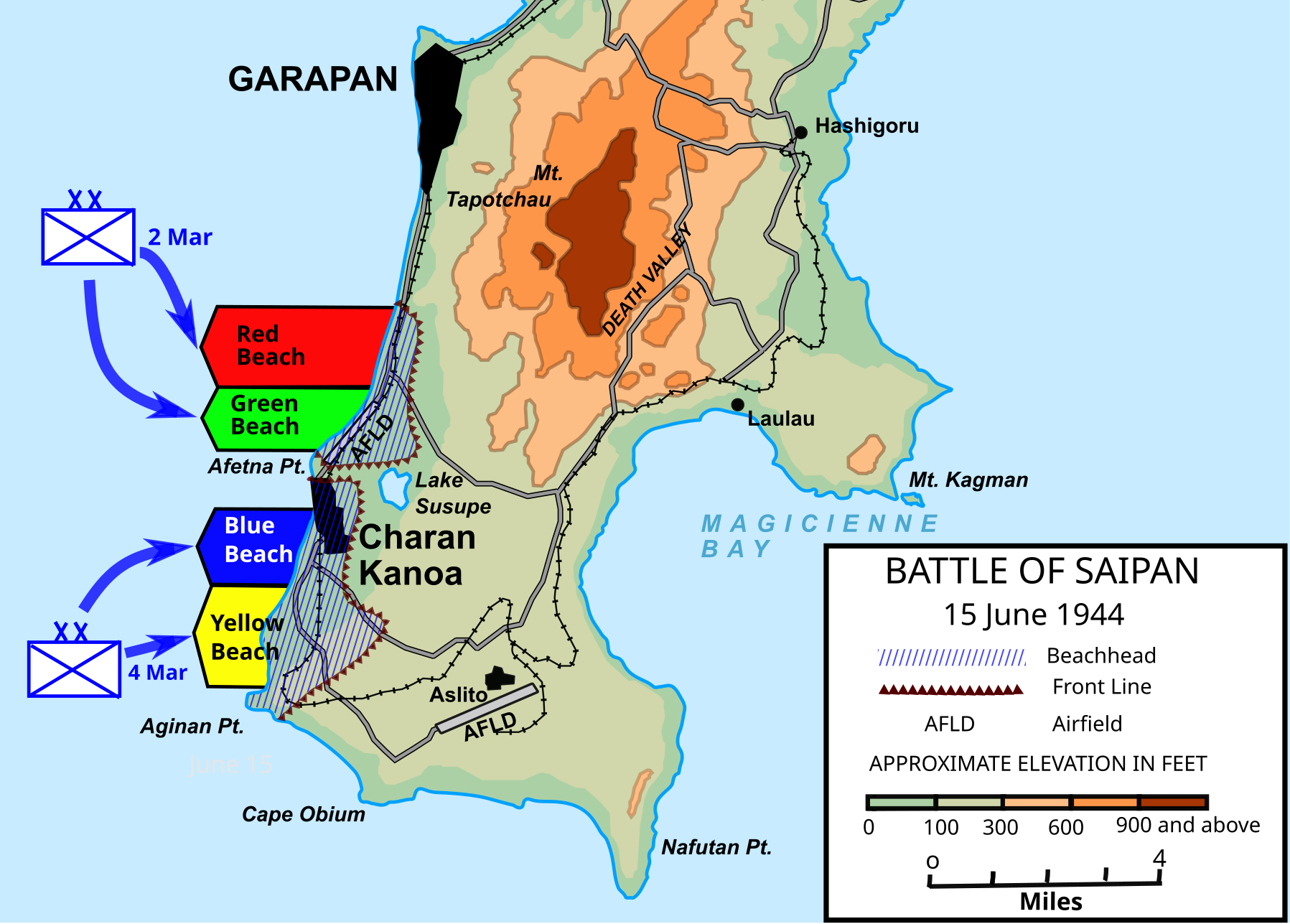
American beachheads on Saipan at the end of 15 June

By the end of the day, the Marines managed to establish a bridgehead about 5.5 mi (9 km) along the beach and 0.5 mi (1 km) inland, and had unloaded artillery and tanks. The bridgehead was only about two-thirds the size of the planned objective, the two Marine divisions were separated by a wide gap just north of Charan Kanoa, and the Japanese artillery remained intact on the high ground surrounding the beach.

When darkness fell, Saito launched a series of night attacks to push the Americans back into the sea. The Japanese launched repeated counterattacks during the night and the early hours of the following morning, mostly by poorly coordinated small units. All the attacks were repulsed, partly by the firepower provided by the tanks and artillery that had been unloaded during the day, as well as by American warships that illuminated the combat areas with star shells.

=== 16–20 June: Southern Saipan ===
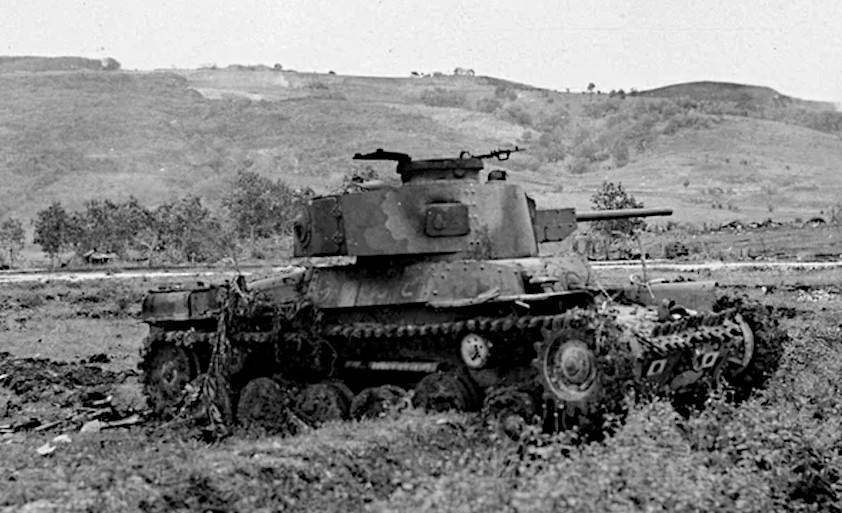
Japanese Type 97 medium tank knocked out in 17 June attack

On 16 June, Holland Smith committed his reserves to reinforce the beachhead, ordering two of the three regiments of the 27th Infantry Division—the 165th and the 105th—to land. He proposed to indefinitely postpone the 18 June invasion of Guam. (Note: The invasion of Guam did not occur until 21 July.) The two Marine divisions on Saipan spent most of the day consolidating the beachhead. The 2nd Marine Division began to close the gap between the two divisions north of Charan Kanoa, and the 4th Marine Division cleared the area around Aginan point on the southwest of the Island.

During the night, Saitō launched a tank assault on the flank of the beachhead just north of Charan Kanoa with around 35 Type 97 medium tanks and Type 95 light tanks (Note: Hallas 2019, p. 165 puts the number between 24 and 32; Crowl 1993, p. 98 puts the number at no less than 37; Hoffman 1950, p. 86, Morison 1981, p. 202 and Shaw, Nalty & Turnbladh 1989, p. 284 put the number at 44.) and about 1,000 soldiers. The attack was poorly coordinated. Nagumo's naval troops, who were supposed to be part of the attack, did not cooperate. The attack was broken up by bazookas, 37 mm anti-tank guns, M4 Sherman tanks, and self-propelled 75 mm howitzers. Around 31 Japanese tanks were knocked out.

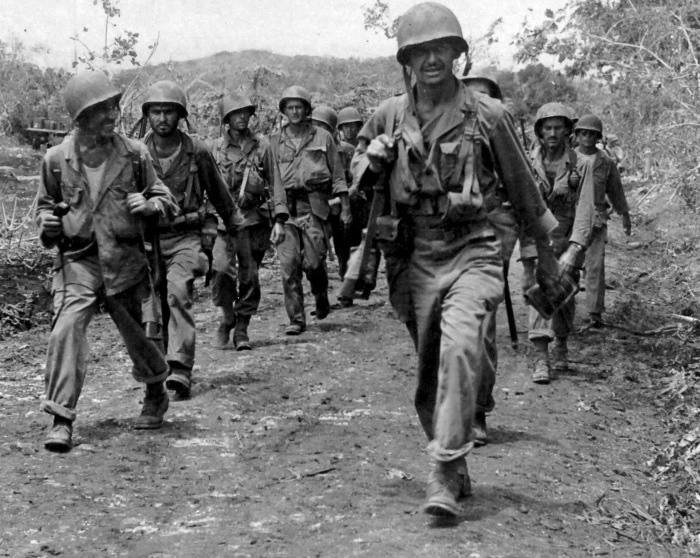
Soldiers of 27th Infantry Division moving inland after landing on 16 June

In the following days, the 2nd Marine Division on the northern half of the bridgehead cleared the area around Lake Susupe and reached the objectives for the first day of the invasion, and slowly moved north toward Garapan and Mount Tapotchou. In the southern half of the bridgehead, the 4th Marine Division began their advance on Aslito Field. On 18 June, the two regiments of the 27th Infantry Division, which was now fighting as a unit, captured the field as the Japanese withdrew to Nafutan Point in the southeast of the island. The 4th Marine Division had reached the island's eastern coast, cutting off the Japanese troops at Nafutan Point from the north. During this time, Saitō was falsely rumored to have been killed. Igeta erroneously reported Saitō's death to Tokyo, though he corrected the report later.

Holland Smith ordered the 27th Infantry Division to quickly capture Nafutan Point, but it was unable to do so. Smith had estimated that no more than 300 Japanese soldiers were in the area, but more than 1,000 were defending the rough terrain. The battle for the point continued for over a week.

By 19 June, the Japanese forces on the island had been reduced by about half. Saitō began withdrawing his troops to a new defensive line in the center of the island. By this time, the Americans had suffered over 6,000 casualties. The Marine divisions headed north toward the new Japanese defenses, and Holland Smith called for the final reserve of the Expeditionary Forces, ordering the last regiment of the 27th infantry Division, the 106th, to land on Saipan on 20 June.

=== Battle of Philippine Sea ===
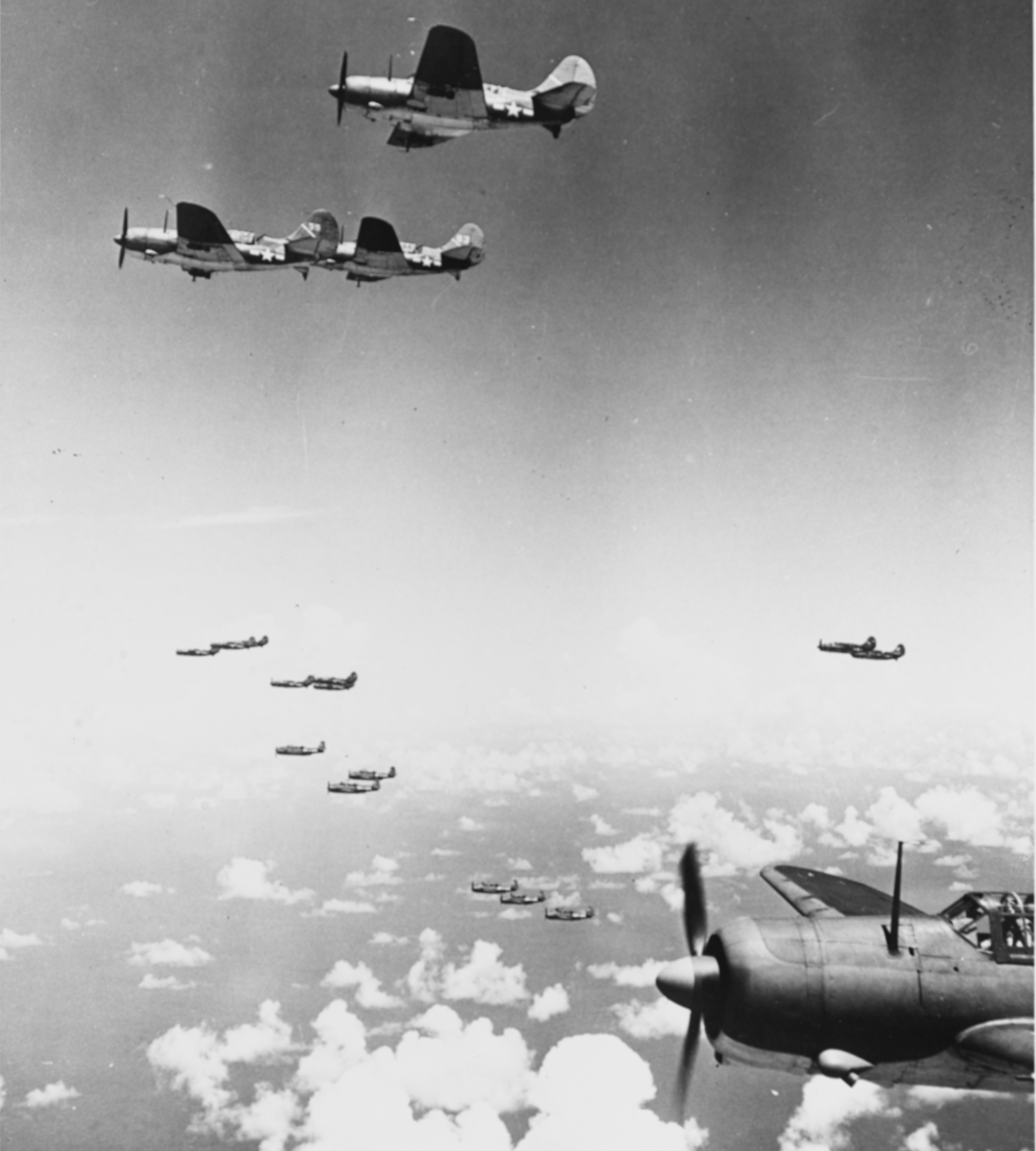
TBF Avenger torpedo planes and SB2C Helldiver dive bombers from the Fast Carrier Task Force en route to attack the 1st Mobile Fleet, June 1944 during the Battle of the Philippine Sea

Once Admiral Soemu Toyoda, Commander-in-Chief of the Combined Fleet, was certain that Saipan was the target of an invasion, he initiated his response. Less than a half hour after the start of the amphibious invasion, he announced the implementation of Operation A-Go, the Japanese Navy's current plan to destroy the American fleet. He then sent a message to the entire fleet that repeated Admiral Heihachirō Tōgō's speech before Japan's decisive naval battle against Russia at Tsushima in 1905, which in turn echoed Horatio Nelson's signal at the Battle of Trafalgar in 1805: "The fate of the Empire rests upon this single battle. Every man is expected to do his utmost."

Originally, the Japanese Navy sought to have the battle take place in the Palaus or Western Carolines, and MacArthur's invasion of Biak had led them to believe that they could lure the American fleet there. After the preinvasion bombardment of Saipan, Toyoda guessed Saipan was the target and ordered Vice Admiral Matome Ugaki who commanded the super battleships Yamato and Musashi to rendezvous with Vice Admiral Jisaburō Ozawa, commander of the 1st Mobile Fleet and to rendezvous in the Philippine Sea to attack the American fleet around Saipan. The Japanese fleet, which had 9 aircraft carriers, 5 battleships, and nearly 500 airplanes was outnumbered by the American fleet, which had 16 aircraft carriers, seven battleships, and almost 1,000 airplanes. The Japanese thought they had some advantages: the longer range of the Japanese planes would allow them the opportunity to strike the Americans without fear of immediate retaliation, the availability of airbases on the Marianas would give the carrier planes a place to land and quickly rearm, and Kakuta was incorrectly assumed to have 500 additional land-based planes available.

The American transports continued to unload supplies and reinforcements throughout 17 June. The following day, the transports sailed east toward safety, while the warships set off for battle with the Japanese fleet. On 19–20 June, the fleets fought an aircraft carrier battle. The Japanese struck first, launching four large air attacks on the American fleet. The Japanese aviators were inexperienced and outnumbered; very few of the anticipated land-based planes were available, and those that were had little effect.

The Japanese lost almost 500 planes and almost all their aviators; their carrier forces were left with only 35 operable aircraft. The Americans lost about 130 planes and 76 aviators. An American counterstrike sank a Japanese carrier, and American submarines sank two others, including Ozawa's flagship Taihō. The Japanese submarine fleet failed to play a significant role as well. The invasion forced Takagi to move his headquarters from Garapan into the mountains of Saipan, making his command ineffective. Out of 25 submarines deployed for the battle, 17 were sunk. Though defenders on the island did not know it at the time, the defeat of the Japanese fleet ensured that they would not be reinforced, resupplied, or receive further military support. The Japanese command was determined to hold the island at all costs, but it would be fighting a losing battle of attrition.

=== 21–24 June: Central Saipan, initial attack ===
Marines confronting rough terrain with a limestone cave typical of central and north Saipan, June 1944

Saitō's new defense line stretched from Garapan on the west coast to the southern slopes of Mount Tapatchou across to Magicienne Bay on the east coast. It held most of the island's high ground, which allowed the Japanese to observe American movements, and the rough terrain was filled with caves concealed by brush.

The American forces prepared for a frontal assault on Saitō's line using all three divisions. The attack began on 22 June. The 2nd Marine Division which was on the western coast moved toward Garapan and Mount Tapatchou; the 4th Marine Division advanced along the eastern coast, which created gaps in the lines in the hilly ground between the two divisions. That evening, the 27th Infantry Division, less the regiment left to reduce Nafutan point, was ordered to move up into the difficult terrain between the two Marine divisions.

The next day, the Marine divisions on the flanks made progress, but the 27th Infantry Division, which started its attack late, stalled in its assault on a valley surrounding a low-lying ridge that was defended by about 4,000 Japanese soldiers. The battle around these features, which American soldiers nicknamed the "Death Valley" and "Purple Heart Ridge", began to bend the line of the American advance into a horseshoe, creating gaps in the Marine divisions' flanks and forcing them to halt.

Frustrated by what he saw as lack of progress by the 27th Division, Holland Smith relieved its commander, Major General Ralph Smith, and temporarily replaced him with another Army officer, Major General Sanderford Jarman. The debate over the appropriateness of Holland's Smith action–a Marine general dismissing an Army general–immediately created an inter-service controversy. (Note: The controversy continues to be debated. See Crowl 1993, pp. 191–201 for a detailed discussion; see Lacey 2013, pp. 157–161 and McManus 2021, pp. 363–371 for more recent discussions.) Despite the replacement of the 27th Infantry Division's commander, six more days were needed for the valley to be captured.

=== 25–30 June: Central Saipan, breakthrough ===
==== American firepower ====
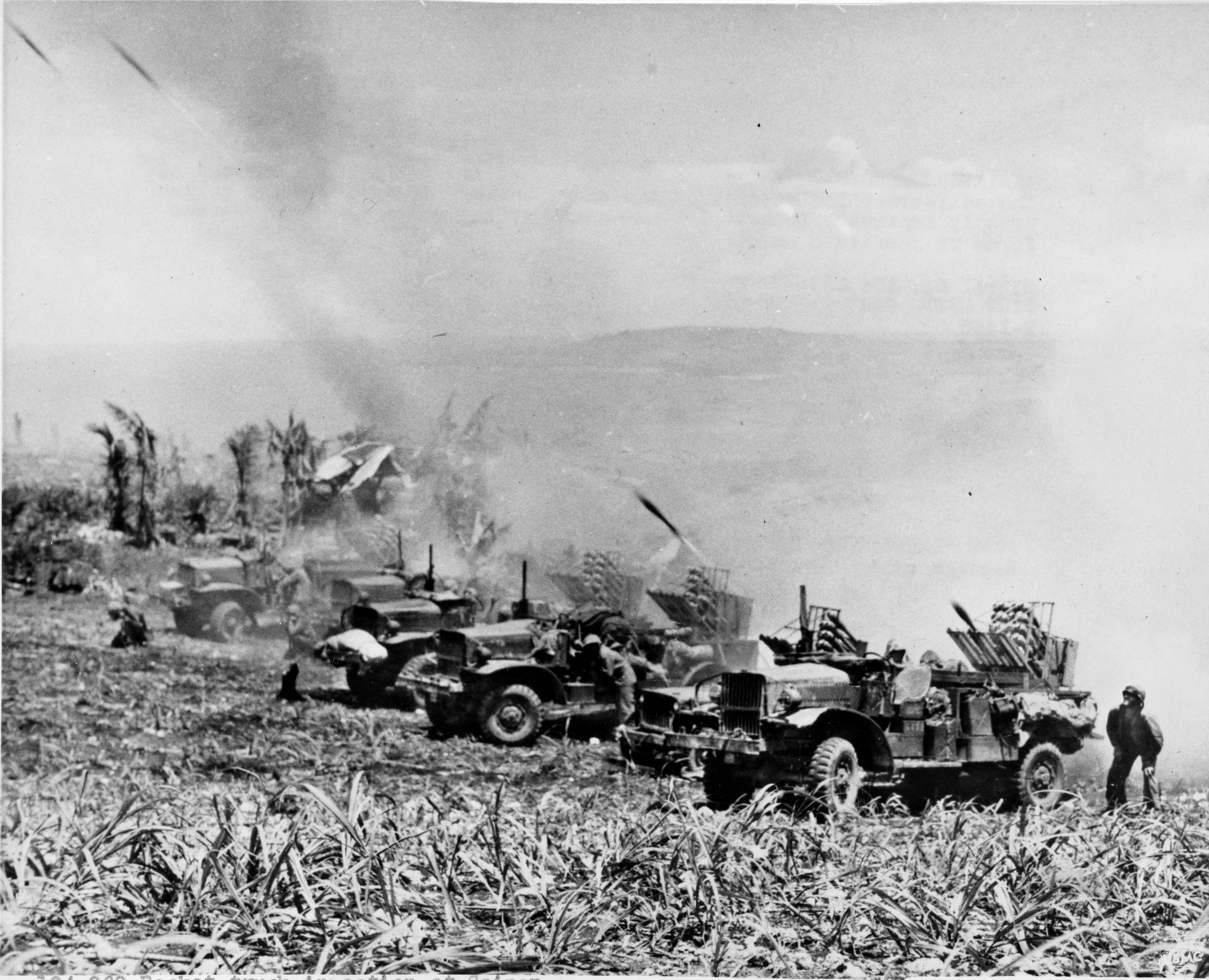
IHC M–2–4 rocket trucks on Saipan firing a barrage, June 1944

The United States forces had built up substantial firepower to continue their northward drive. On 22 June, P-47s from the Seventh Air Force landed on Aslito Field and immediately began launching ground assault missions. On the same day, the XXIV Corps Artillery commanded by Brigadier General Arthur M. Harper moved 24 155 mm field guns and 24 155 mm howitzers into place to fire on Japanese positions. The Americans also used truck-launched rockets for saturation barrages. Spotters flying in L-4 Grasshoppers helped direct ground artillery, and Navajo code talkers relayed information about Japanese troop movements. In the hills, soldiers relied on personal flamethrowers, particularly in locations where the motorized flamethrowers could not reach. They gradually developed tactics for effectively reducing caves, using a combination of flamethrowers and demolition charges to clear them, or sometimes using demolitions to seal them off.

By 24 June, the American warships that had returned from the Battle of Philippine Sea were once more available to provide fire support. Ship fire was particularly feared by the Japanese because it could strike from almost any direction. Saitō singled out naval gunfire undermining the Japanese' ability to fight successfully against the Americans. The ships were also well-supplied with star shells, providing illumination that disrupted Japanese night movements and counterattacks. This naval support was facilitated by joint assault signal companies that directed both naval and aerial firepower to where it was needed by the ground forces.

==== American advance and Japanese break out at Nafutan Point ====
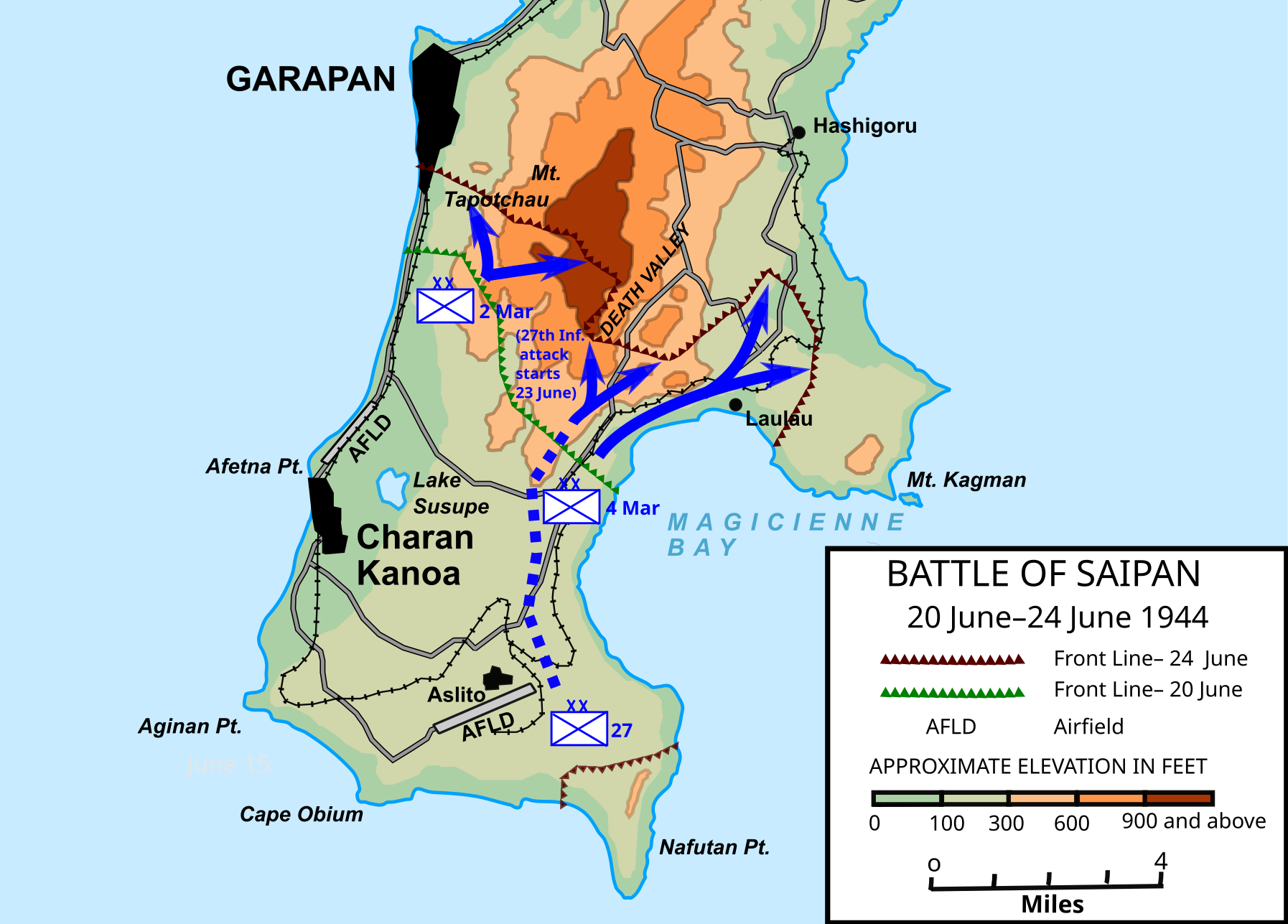
American advance in central Saipan between 20 and 24 June

On 25 June, the 27th Infantry Division was not able to make much headway in their fight for Death Valley, but the 2nd Marine Division to the west gained control of Mount Tapotchau, the key artillery observation posts in central Saipan. On the east coast, the 4th Marine Division quickly occupied most of the Kagman peninsula, meeting little organized resistance because the Japanese had evacuated the peninsula. Between 26 June and 30 June, the 2nd Marine Division and the 27th Infantry Division made little progress. The 2nd Marines remained south of Garapan, slowly fighting their way north of Mount Tapotchau. The 4th Marine Division was able to advance up the eastern coast to a line just north of the village of Hashigoru.

About 500 Japanese soldiers broke out of Nafutan Point on the night of 26 June. They headed toward Aslito Field, destroying one P-47 and damaging two others. They then ran into a unit of Marines, who were in reserve, and a unit of Marine artillery. Almost all the Japanese soldiers were killed in the ensuing firefight. The next day, the elements of the 27th Infantry Division that had been fighting at the point moved in to occupy the area, no survivors were found.

Igeta's 31st Army Headquarters sent a telegram from the island on 27 June, stating the Japanese would not be able to hold due to the American preponderance in artillery, sea and air power, as well of a lack of equipment and supplies, including food and water. Water shortages were particularly acute in the limestone caves the Japanese soldiers used for defense. Igeta reported that some soldiers had not had water for three days and were surviving on snails and tree leaves. Japanese communications were so disrupted that at one point during the week, Igeta could only account for 950 of the Japanese soldiers.

On 28 June, Army Major General George Griner, who had been sent for from Hawaii, took over command of the 27th Infantry Division. Jarman, whose command had been temporary, returned to his assigned role as garrison commander of the island. On 30 June, the 27th Infantry Division captured Death Valley and Purple Heart Ridge, and advanced far enough to re-establish contact with the two Marine divisions on their flanks. Saitō's main line of defense in Central Saipan had been breached, and the Japanese began their retreat north to their final defensive line. To date, American casualties were about 11,000.

=== 1–6 July: Pursuit into northern Saipan ===
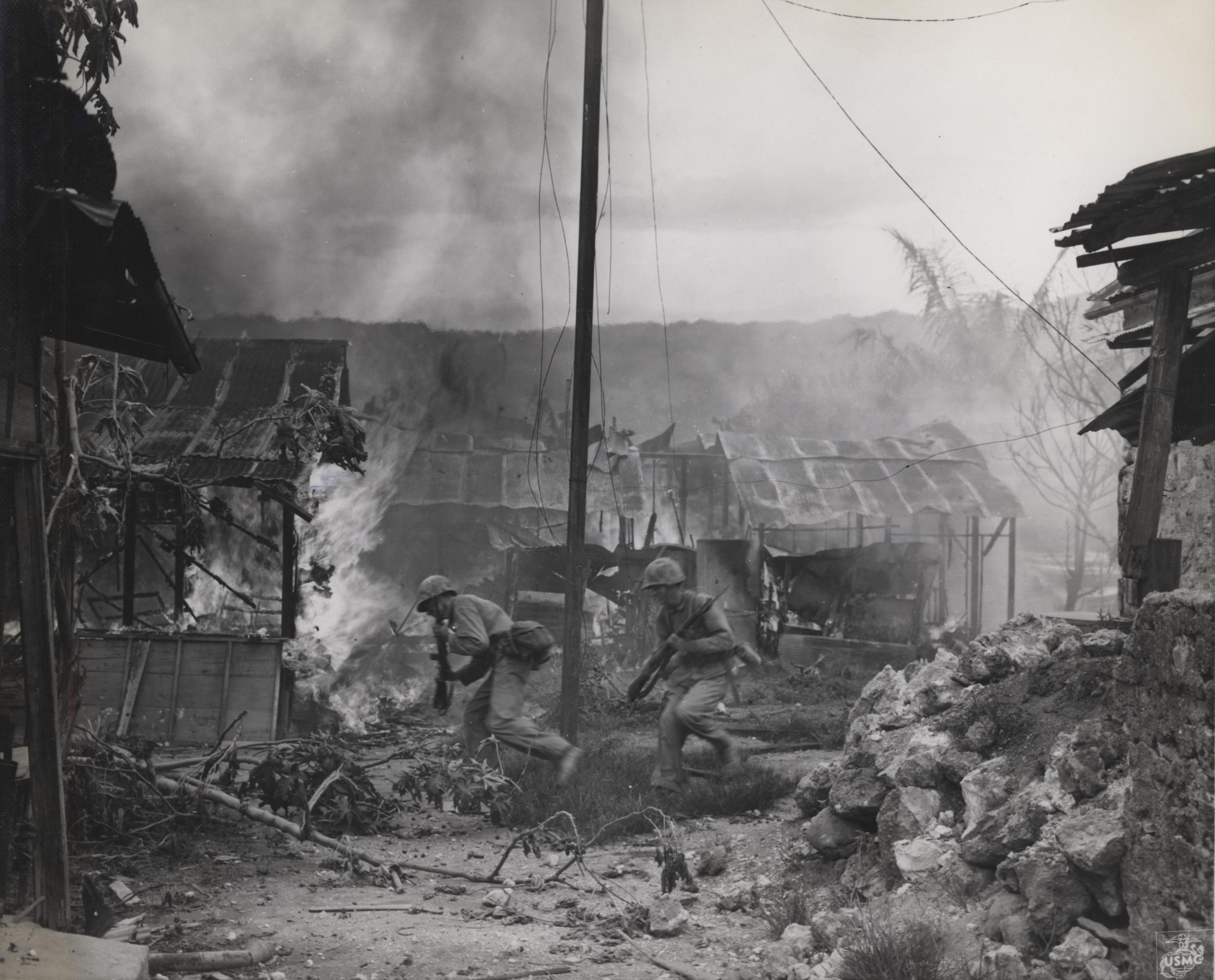
Marines advancing through the ruins of Garapan on 3 July

Saitō intended to form a new line in northern Saipan that would be anchored on Tanapag on the west, running southeast to a village called Tarahoho, and through to the east coast. He was not able to. His army's cohesion was disintegrating. Some of the remaining forces retreated north, some holed up in whatever caves they could find, and others put up disorganized resistance where they were. During 2–4 July, the 2nd Marine Division took the ruins of Garapan and its harbor. The 4th Marine Division quickly moved north on the west coast in the face of light resistance. As Saitō's attempt to form the defense line collapsed, he eventually moved his final headquarters near Makunsha village on the west coast north of Tanapag.

On 4 July, the 27th Infantry Division and 4th Marine Division headed northwest. The 27th division reached the west coast at Flores Point, south of Tanapag, cutting off any Japanese retreating from Garapan. The 2nd Marine Division no longer faced organized resistance, and went into reserve. The 27th Infantry Division was to move up the east coast toward Tanapag, and the 4th Marine Division would advance northwest. On 5 July, the 27th Infantry Division encountered strong resistance in a narrow canyon on the east coast north of Tanapag that they dubbed "Harikari Gulch", which expanded into a two-day battle.

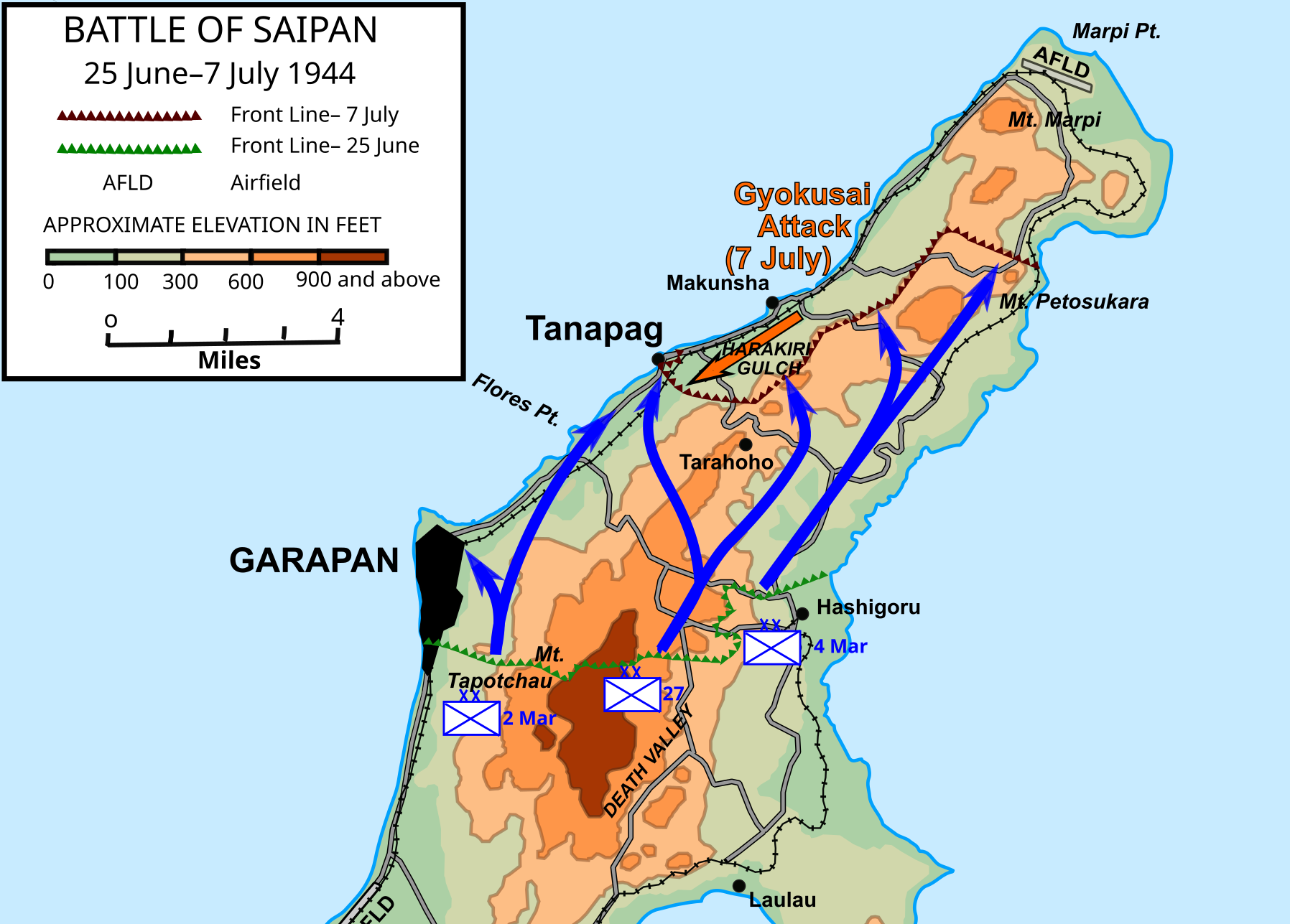
American advance between 30 June–6 July, showing the 7 July gyokusai assault

The 4th Marine Division continued to make rapid progress north during 4–5 July, and on 6 July, Holland Smith ordered them to head toward the eastern coast near Makunsha to cut off the Japanese forces fighting the 27th Infantry Division, then the Marines would complete the occupation of the rest of northern Saipan on their own. In the evening, the Marines had taken Mount Petosukara, one of the last mountains before reaching the northern tip of the island, but the units that turned toward Makunsha encountered too much resistance to reach the eastern coast.

Saitō realized he could not create a final defensive line. His headquarters, which had been under constant artillery attack for days, were now in range of American machine guns. What was left of his command was trapped in a northern corner of the island, almost out of food and water, and slowly being destroyed by overwhelming American firepower. On 6 July, Saitō decided the situation was hopeless and sent out orders for the remainder of his forces to perform gyokusai, a final suicide attack to destroy as many of the enemy as possible. He set the attack for the following day to give the troops a chance to concentrate what was left of his forces and put his divisional chief of staff, Colonel Takuji Suzuki, in charge. That night, Saitō ate a last meal and committed seppuku; Nagumo killed himself around the same time. (Note: Whether Saitō died with Nagumo or Igeta is unclear. Many sources derive their story from Major Takashi Hirakushi, a captured public relations officer. who initially claimed to be Major Kiyoshi Yoshida, an intelligence officer who actually died in combat. (cf.,Goldberg 2007, p. 173 who describes the testimony of "Kiyoshi Yoshida"). Hallas 2019, p. 514, fn44 points out that in early accounts, Saitō commits suicide alone (e.g., see the early account in Hoffman 1950, Appendix IX:The Last Days of General Saitō, pp.283–284), and a different Japanese survivor states that Nagumo committed suicide elsewhere. Toland 2003, p. 511–512, bases his account, in which Saitō, Nagumo, and Igeta die together on a much later interview with Hirakushi.) Takagi stated he would die attacking the enemy.

=== 7–9 July: Gyokusai attack and battle's end ===
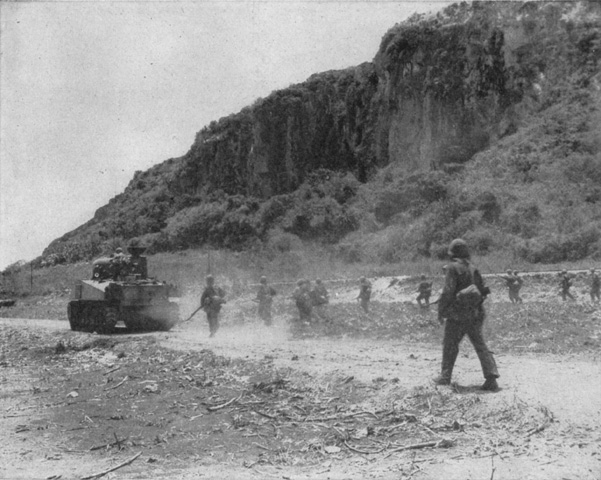
Marines of the 2nd Marine Division advancing north on Tanapag plain on 8 July after the gyokusai attack

At least 3,000 Japanese combatants participated in the gyokusai attack. (Note: The number of Japanese in the attack is unclear. During the attack, Smith underestimated, stating that only 300–400 were participating. Hirakushi (at that time known as Major Yoshida), who was part of the attack, claimed during his interrogation after being captured that about 1,500 participated. After the fighting, General Griner of the 27th infantry Division counted 4,311 Japanese bodies in the area of the attack, but whether all of them had died in the attack was disputed . A later commission ordered by Spruance put the number between 1,500 and 3,000, arguing that many of the bodies were from people who died before the attack. Smith eventually agreed with Spruance's report.) They assembled near Makunsha. The force included naval personnel, support troops, civilians, and the walking wounded. It included three tanks, supporting mortars, and machine guns, but some troops were only armed with sticks with bayonets, knives, or grenades tied to poles. It would be the largest gyokusai attack of the Pacific War.

At around 04:00, Suzuki's force advanced south along the western coastal area, called the Tanapag plain, toward where his reconnaissance patrols had found a weak spot in the American line near Tanapag village: two battalions of the 105 Infantry Regiment of the 27th Infantry Division were isolated from the other American forces. The main force struck the two battalions at about 04:45, overrunning both. The two battalions suffered about 900 casualties, which was 80% of their effective force. The charge continued toward Tanapag village, overrunning two batteries of Marine artillery, but was halted in the late morning by a hastily formed American line around the village. The fighting continued throughout the day, as American soldiers struggled against scattered elements of the gyokusai attack and recaptured lost ground.

On 8 July, most of the 27th Infantry Division, which had suffered high losses in the gyokusai attack, was placed into reserve. The 2nd Marine Division advanced up the Tanapag plain, looking for Japanese stragglers. The 4th Marine Division reached the western coast north of Makunsha and headed toward Marpi Point, near the island's northern-most tip. As they advanced, they saw hundreds of Japanese civilians die on inland and coastal cliffs. Some threw themselves off, others were thrown or pushed off. By the evening of 9 July, the 4th Marine Division had reached the northern end of the Island and Turner declared the island secure. On the second day of the battle, he had estimated that Saipan would be captured in a week; it had taken 24 days. On 11 July, the Americans found General Saitō's body. He was buried on 13 July with full military honors in a coffin draped with the Japanese flag.

Though the island was declared secured, the fighting and suicides continued. Clearing the hundreds of scattered Japanese soldiers hiding in caves would take many months, though responsibilities were handed over to the Army Garrison Force. One group of about 50 Japanese men—soldiers and civilians—was led by Captain Sakae Ōba, who survived the last gyokusai charge. His group evaded capture and conducted guerrilla-style attacks, raiding American camps for supplies. Ōba's resistance earned him the nickname "the Fox". His men held out for approximately 16 months before surrendering on 1 December 1945, three months after the official surrender of Japan.

== Casualties ==
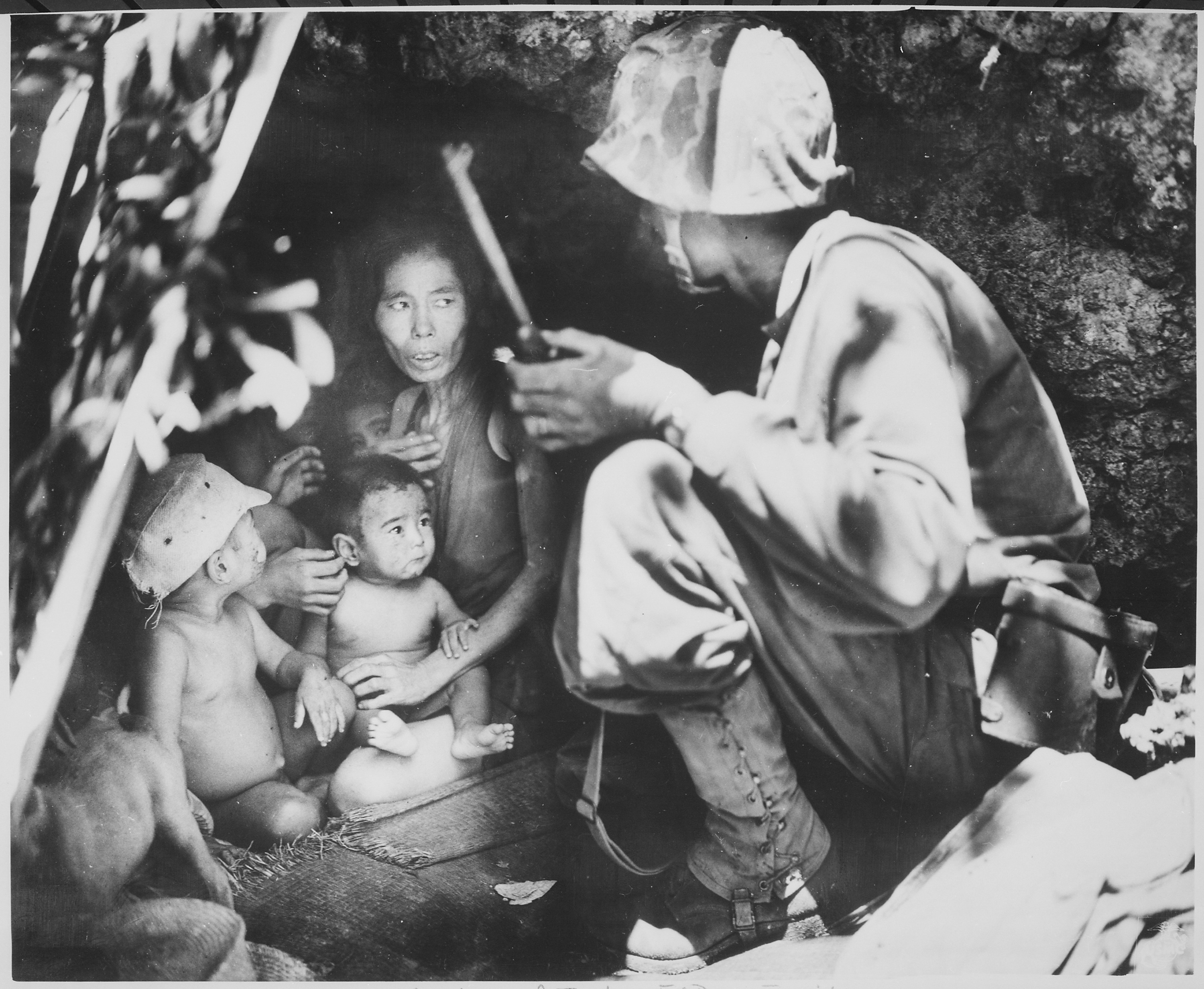
First Lieutenant Robert Sheeks talks a woman with children and a dog into leaving a hillside cave on 21 June

Almost the entire Japanese garrison—approximately 30,000 military personnel—were killed in the battle. Eventually 1,700, about half of whom were Korean workers, were taken prisoner. American forces suffered about 16,500 casualties—3,100 killed and 13,000 wounded—out of 71,000 who were part of the assault force. The casualty rate was over 20%, which was comparable to Tarawa. It was the Americans' most deadly battle in the Pacific up to that time.

Approximately 40% of the civilians on Saipan were killed. An estimated 8,000 to 10,000 died during or shortly after the fighting, and the 14,000 survivors were interned. Many civilians died from the bombing, shelling and cross-fire. Others died because they hid in caves and shelters indistinguishable from Japanese combat positions, which the Marines typically destroyed with explosives, grenades and flamethrowers. Though many civilians were able to surrender early in the battle, surrender became more difficult as the battle moved into the northern mountains. Obscuring terrain made it hard to distinguish combatants and surrendering civilians, who risked being killed by both sides. Many refused to surrender because they believed rumors that the Japanese fleet was coming to rescue them. Some refused because of the fear spread by Japanese propaganda that Americans would rape, torture and kill them; others were coerced. Around 1,000 civilians committed suicide during the final days of the battle, some after 9 July when the island had been declared secure. Many died by throwing themselves off cliffs at places that would become known as "Suicide Cliff" and "Banzai Cliff".

== Logistics ==
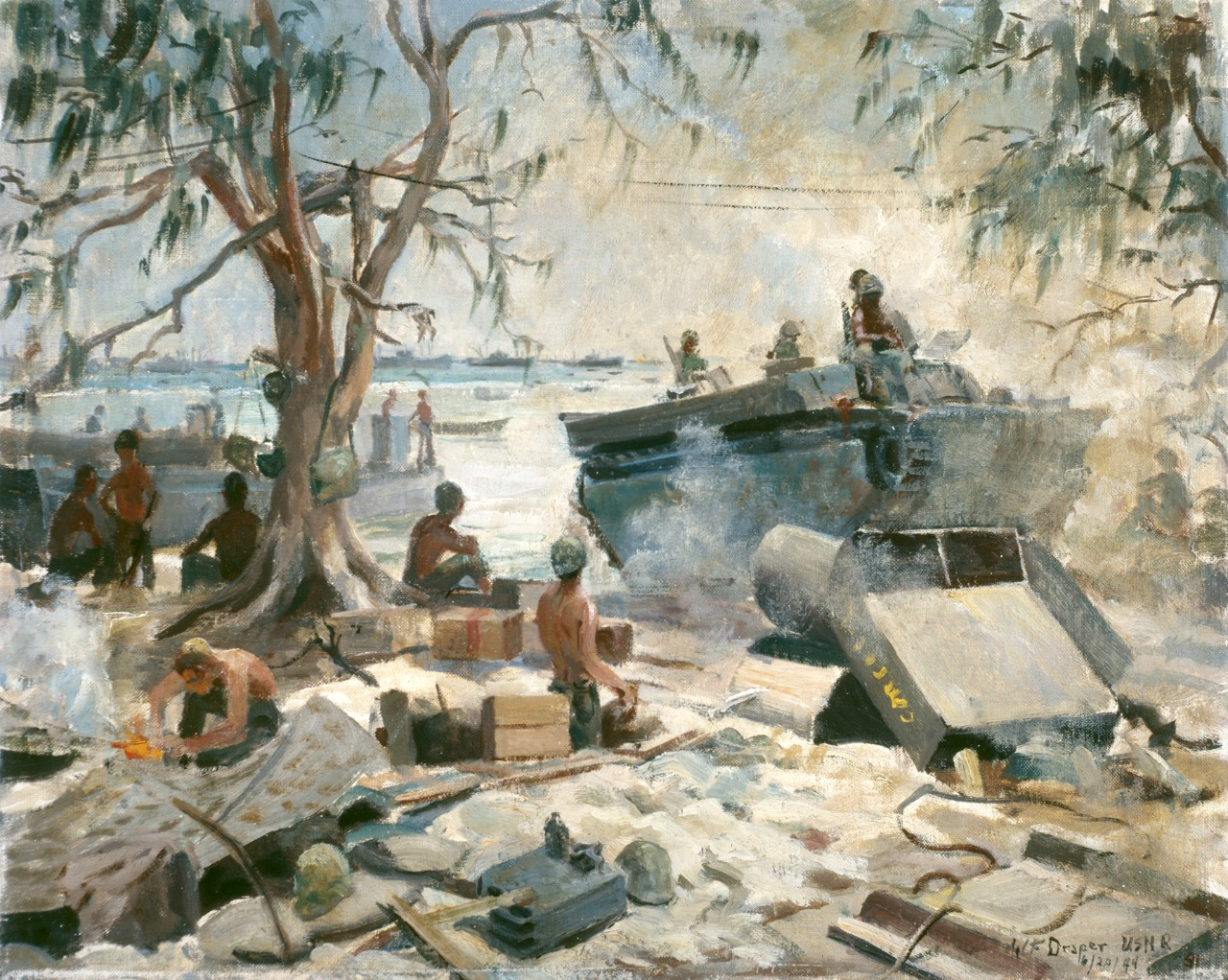
An LVT Comes Ashore, Saipan, a 1944 oil painting by William Franklin Draper. (Navy Art Collection, Naval History and Heritage Command)

The American forces brought their supplies with the invasion fleet, carrying over one ton of supplies per soldier: 32 days of rations, 30 days of medical supplies, 20 days of maintenance supplies, seven days of ammunition for ground weapons, and 10 days of anti-aircraft ammunition. Mobile reserves and an ammunition resupply train, as well as regular resupply shipments came from depots at Eniwetok, which was 1,017 mi (1,637 km) from Saipan.

During the early days of the invasion, LVTs dumped boxes of rations, water and ammunition on the beaches. Heavy swells on the first days forced many of the supplies to be loaded on only one beach, and LVTs were required to get over reefs that restricted access. Constant Japanese mortar and artillery fire interfered with organizing these supplies for the first three days. Unloading became haphazard, and some units had difficulty finding their equipment. The withdrawal of the transports for five days during the Battle of Philippine Sea also slowed down the delivery of supplies.

The 27th Infantry Division particularly suffered from this initial disorganization. No plans had been made for its landing and it did not have an assigned unloading area. Its equipment was mixed up with the Marine divisions and its artillery ammunition was misplaced. Because it arrived on Saipan after the Marine divisions, the 27th Infantry Division had less time to unload its supplies before the transports temporarily headed east on 18 June. Initially, the division only had enough infantry ammunition for four days. Food and artillery ammunition had to be borrowed from the Marines, and water had to be supplemented from cisterns captured at Aslito Field.

Later in the campaign, mortar ammunition ran low as planners had underestimated how frequently they would be used, and there were shortages of motorized transportation, which was used for getting supplies from the beach to the frontline. Naval ships ran low on star shells due to their high demand, and their use had to be rationed. Despite these issues, the overall supply situation during the battle was good: the Americans had an abundance of materiel.

The Japanese troops had no chance of reinforcement. From January to June, the Japanese had tried to ship men and supplies to Saipan, but many ships around the island were torpedoed by American submarines. The Japanese government reported that one ship out of three sent to the Marianas was sunk and another was damaged. Though many of the men survived, almost all the materiel was lost. For example, on 25 May two freighters from Saipan to Palau were torpedoed, destroying 2,956 tons of food, 5,300 cans of aviation fuel, 2,500 cubic meters of ammunition, and 500 tons of cement.

At the beginning of the battle, the Americans had six times the tanks, five times the artillery, three times as many small arms, and two times as many machine guns available as the Japanese. The Americans also had much more ammunition. The U.S. Navy fired 11,000 tons of shells during the battle, including over 14,000 rounds of 5-inch ammunition. Unlike the Americans, who could replenish their supplies, the Japanese were forced to rely on whatever was available when the invasion started, and when that ran out they were expected to die honorably, resisting until the end.

== Aftermath ==
The invasion of Saipan and the invasion of France in Operation Overlord demonstrated the dominance of American industrial power. Both were massive amphibious invasions—the two largest up to that time—and they were launched almost simultaneously on separate halves of the globe. Together, they were the greatest deployment of military resources by the United States at one time. Because the Battle of Saipan began just over a week after the 6 June landings for Overlord, its importance has often been overlooked, but just as Overlord was a major step in contributing to the fall of the Third Reich, Saipan marked a major step in the collapse of the Empire of Japan.

=== Impact on American military strategy ===
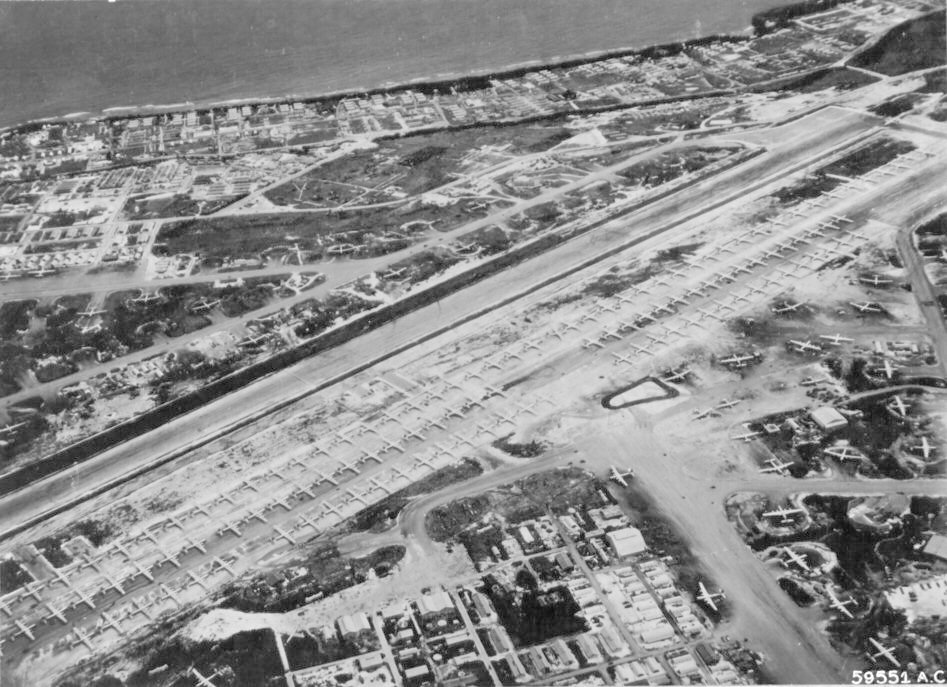
Isely Field, filled with B-29 bombers, mid-1945

The availability of Saipan as an American airbase, along with the airbases already established in Chengdu, opened a new phase in the Pacific War, in which strategic bombing would play a major role. The 15 June invasion of the island had been synchronized with bombing of the Yawata Steel Works by B-29s from bases in China. It was the first bombing of the Japan home islands by B-29s, signaling the beginning of a campaign that could strike deep into Japan's Absolute National Defense Zone.

The Army Air Force was confident that strategic bombing could destroy Japan's military production and that the Marianas provided excellent airbases for doing so because they were 1,200 mi (1,900 km) miles from the Japanese home islands. This put almost all of Japan's industrial cities within striking distance of the B-29 bomber, and the airbases were easy to defend and supply.

Saipan was the first island to base the B-29s. Construction of an aerodrome for B-29s began on Isely Field—the renamed Aslito Field—on 24 June, before the island was declared secure. The first runway was complete by 19 October and the second by 15 December. The 73rd Bombardment Wing began arriving on 12 October. On 24 November, 111 B-29s set out for Tokyo in the first strategic bombing mission against Japan from the Marianas.

The casualties on Saipan were used by American planners to predict American losses in future engagements. This "Saipan ratio"—one killed American and several wounded for every seven Japanese soldiers killed—became one of the justifications for American planners to increase conscription, projecting an increased need for replacements in the war on Japan. Its prediction of high casualties was part of the reason that the Joint Chiefs of Staff did not approve an invasion of Taiwan. The Saipan ratio guided the initial estimate that the invasion of Japan would cost up to 2,000,000 American casualties, including 500,000 killed. Though these estimates would be revised downward later, they would still influence politicians' thinking about the war well into 1945.

=== Impact on Japanese politics and morale ===
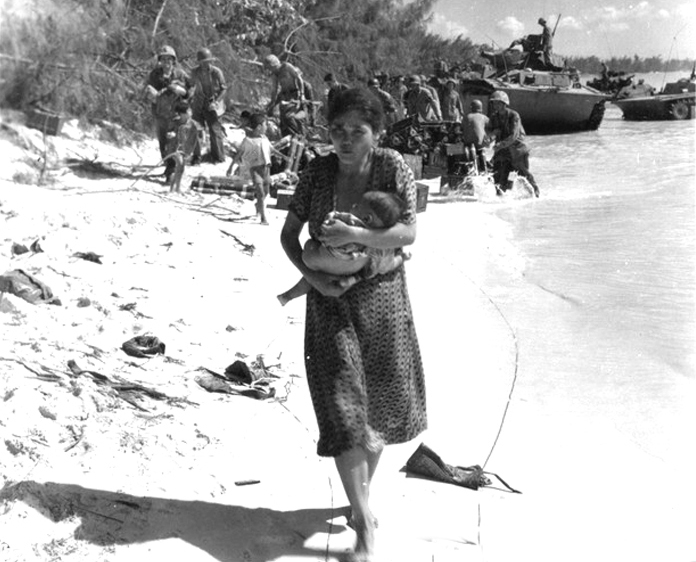
Woman holds a baby as she returns to an internment camp in Saipan, June 1944

Saipan's loss had a greater impact in Japan than any of its previous defeats. The Emperor of Japan, Hirohito, recognized that American control of the island would result in Tokyo being bombed. After the Japanese defeat at the Battle of the Philippine Sea, he demanded that the Japanese General Staff plan another naval attack to prevent its fall. Hirohito only accepted Saipan's eventual fall on 25 June 1944 when his advisors told him all was lost. The defeat brought the collapse of Hideki Tōjō's government. Disappointed with the progress of the war, Hirohito withdrew his support for Tōjō, who resigned as prime minister of Japan on 18 July. He was replaced by former General Kuniaki Koiso, a less capable leader.

Saipan's fall led the Japanese government's war reporting to admit for the first time that the war was going poorly. In July, Imperial General Headquarters published a statement providing a summary of the battle and the loss of the island, and the government allowed a translation of a Time magazine article, which included the civilian suicides on the last days of the battle, to be published in The Asahi Shimbun, Japan's largest newspaper, while the battle was in progress. Before the battle had ended, the Japanese government issued the "Outline for the Evacuation of Schoolchildren" in June, anticipating the bombing of Japan's cities. This evacuation, the only compulsory one enacted during the war, separated more than 350,000 third-through sixth-graders who lived in major cities from their families and sent them into the countryside.

The capture of Saipan pierced the Absolute National Defense Zone, forcing the Japanese leadership to reconsider the outcomes they could expect for the war. In July, the Chief of the War Guidance department of Imperial General Headquarters, Colonel Sei Matsutani, drafted a report stating that the conquest of Saipan destroyed all hope of winning the war. After the war, many Japanese military and political leaders stated that Saipan was a turning point. For example, Vice Admiral Shigeyoshi Miwa stated "Our war was lost with the loss of Saipan," and Fleet Admiral Osami Nagano acknowledged the battle's importance, saying "When we lost Saipan, Hell is on us."

== Memorials ==
Suicide Cliff and Banzai Cliff, along with surviving isolated Japanese fortifications, are recognized as historic sites on the U.S. National Register of Historic Places. The cliffs are part of the National Historic Landmark District Landing Beaches; Aslito/Isley Field; & Marpi Point, Saipan Island, which includes the American landing beaches, the B-29 runways of Isley Field, and the surviving Japanese infrastructure of the Aslito and Marpi Point airfields. The Maritime Heritage Trail has a series of dive sites with submerged ships, planes and tanks from the battle. The American Memorial Park commemorates the American and Mariana people who died during the Mariana Islands campaign, and The Central Pacific War Memorial Monument is dedicated to the memory of the Japanese soldiers and civilians who died.

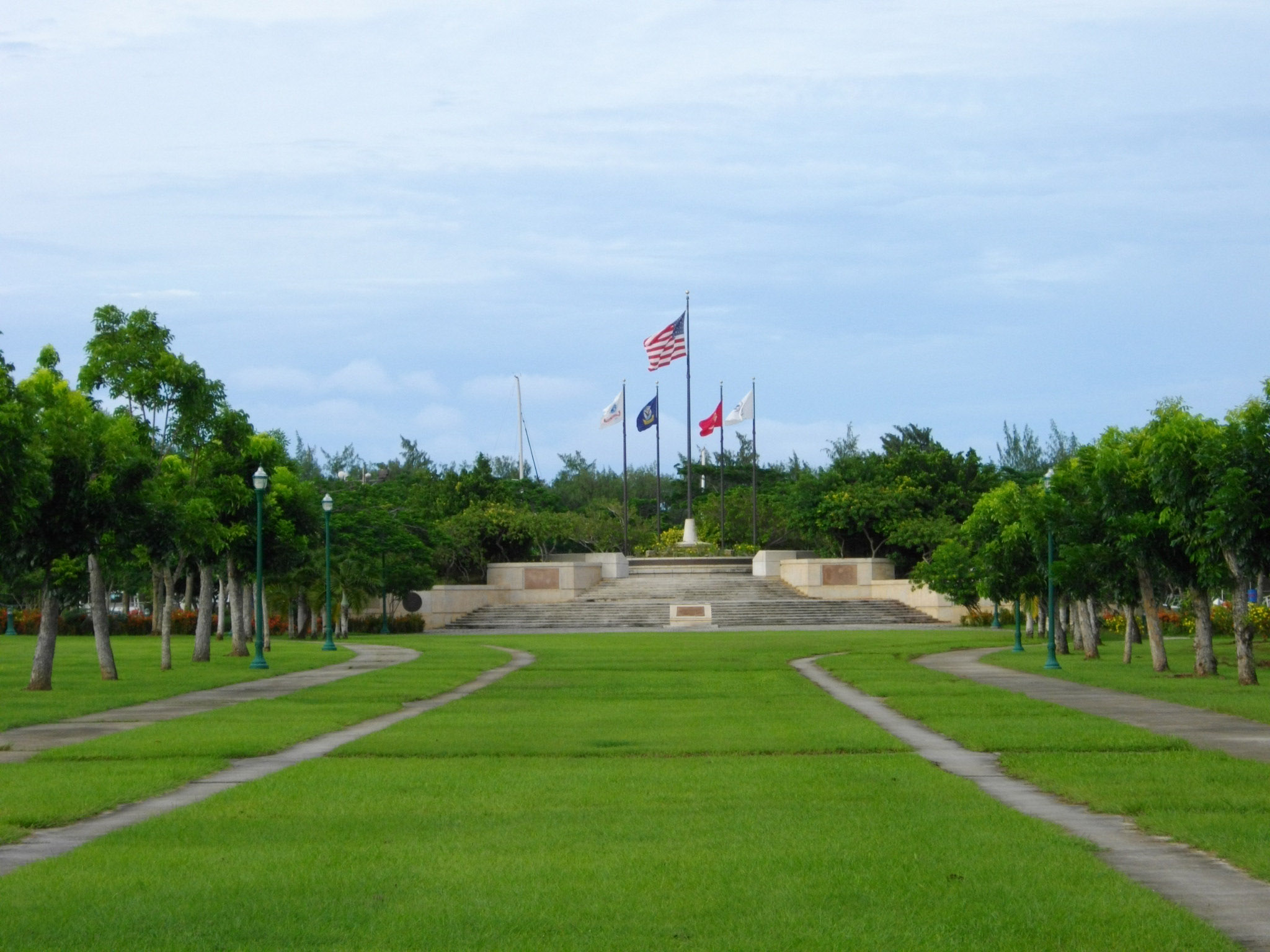
American Memorial Park

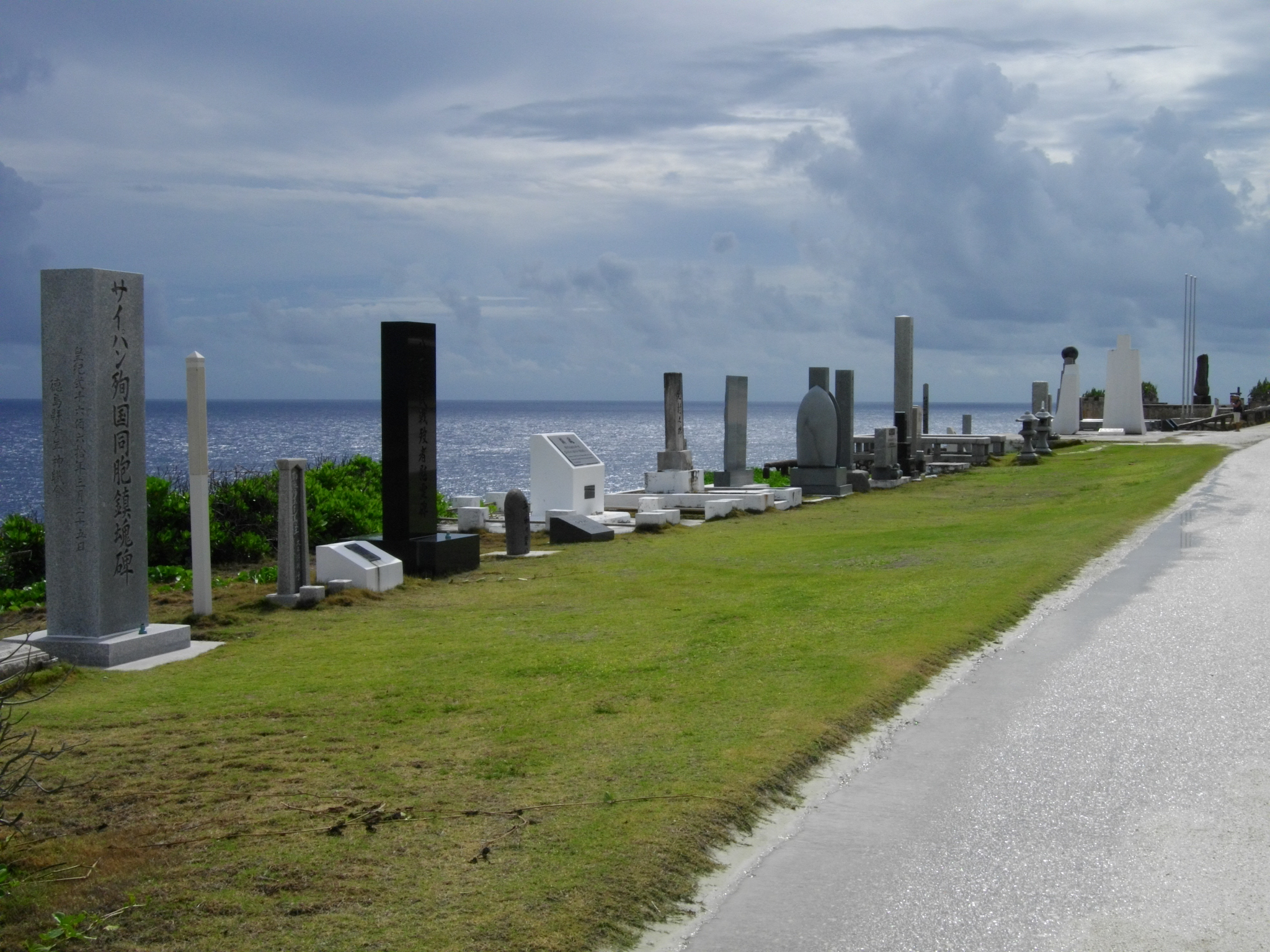
Cenotaphs near Banzai Cliff

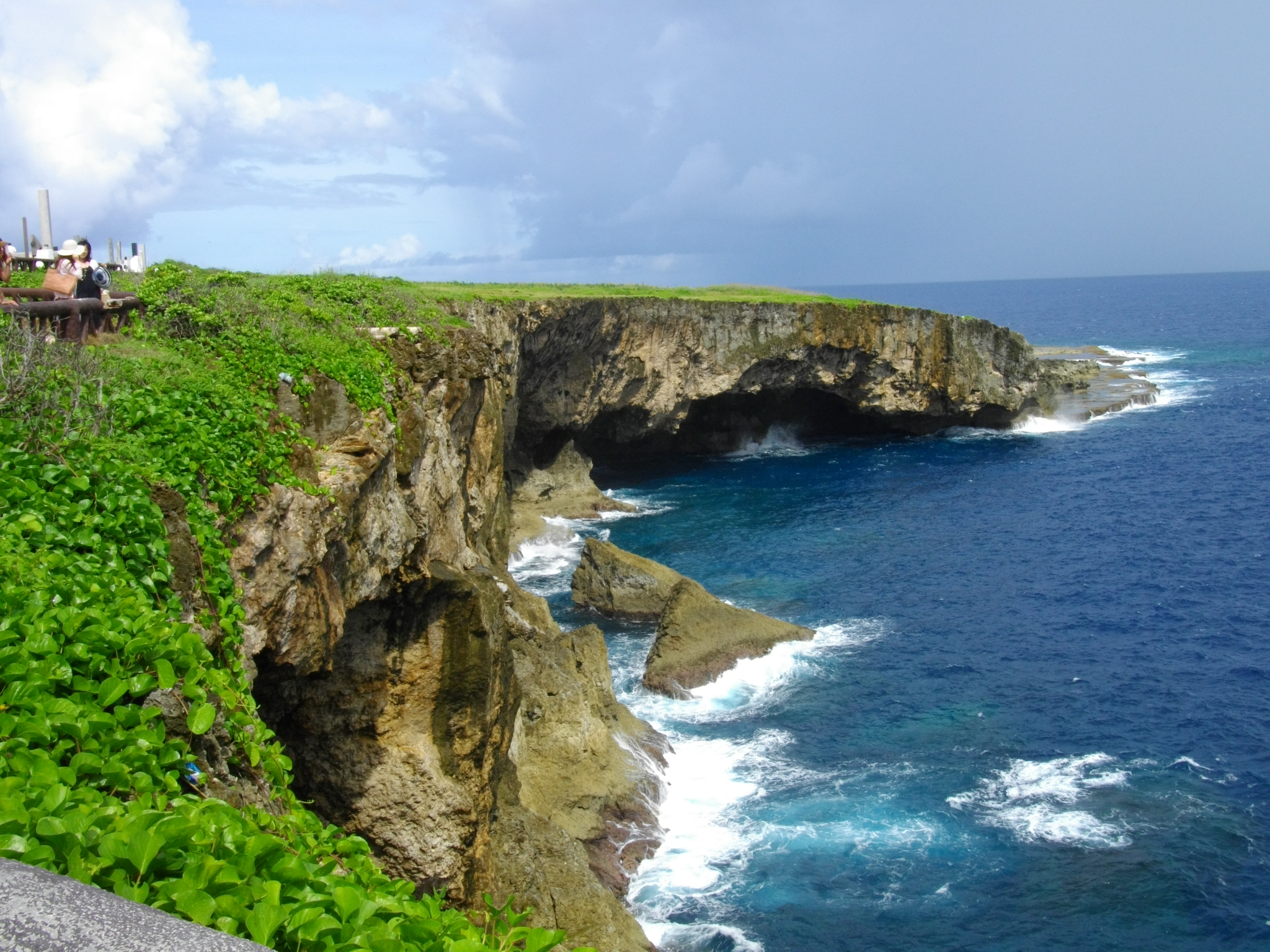
Banzai Cliff, with cenotaphs visible in the upper left corner
