= Last batch of Imperial Japanese Army Divisions =

Japanese infantry and armored units in Home Islands, 15 August 1945

== Mobile reserve divisions ==
=== 221st division ===
221st Division
- 第221師団
- Active: 23 May 1945–1945
- Country: Empire of Japan
- Allegiance: 51st army
- Branch: Imperial Japanese Army
- Type: Infantry
- Garrison/HQ: Nagano - Kashima
- Nickname: Tenryū (天龍)
- Engagements: none

=== 222nd division ===
222nd Division
- 第222師団
- Active: 23 May 1945–1945
- Country: Empire of Japan
- Allegiance: 11th area army
- Branch: Imperial Japanese Army
- Type: Infantry
- Garrison/HQ: Hirosaki - Ichinoseki
- Nicknames: Towada (八甲, Hakko)
- Engagements: none

=== 224th division ===
224th Division
- 第224師団
- Active: 23 May 1945–1945
- Country: Empire of Japan
- Allegiance: 54th army
- Branch: Imperial Japanese Army
- Type: Infantry
- Garrison/HQ: Hiroshima
- Nickname: Akō (赤穂)
- Engagements: none

=== 225th division ===
225th Division
- 第225師団
- Active: 23 May 1945–1945
- Country: Empire of Japan
- Allegiance: 15th area army
- Branch: Imperial Japanese Army
- Type: Infantry
- Garrison/HQ: Himeji
- Nickname: Kongō (金剛)
- Engagements: none

=== 229th division ===
229th Division
- 第229師団
- Active: 23 May 1945–1945
- Country: Empire of Japan
- Allegiance: 13th area army
- Branch: Imperial Japanese Army
- Type: Infantry
- Garrison/HQ: Kanazawa
- Nickname: Hokuetsu (北越)
- Engagements: none

=== 230th division ===
230th Division
- 第230師団
- Active: 23 May 1945–1945
- Country: Empire of Japan
- Allegiance: 59th army
- Branch: Imperial Japanese Army
- Type: Infantry
- Garrison/HQ: Yamaguchi
- Nickname: Sōbu (総武)
- Engagements: none

=== 231st division ===
231st Division
- 第231師団
- Active: 23 May 1945–1945
- Country: Empire of Japan
- Allegiance: 59th army
- Branch: Imperial Japanese Army
- Type: Infantry
- Garrison/HQ: Yamaguchi
- Nicknames: Power (大国, Taikoku)
- Engagements: none

=== 234th division ===
234th Division
- 第234師団
- Active: 23 May 1945–1945
- Country: Empire of Japan
- Allegiance: 52nd army
- Branch: Imperial Japanese Army
- Type: Infantry
- Garrison/HQ: Yōkaichiba
- Nickname: Tone (利根)
- Engagements: none

== Coastal defense divisions ==
=== 303rd division ===
303rd Division
- 第303師団
- Active: 23 May 1945–1945
- Country: Empire of Japan
- Allegiance: 40th army
- Branch: Imperial Japanese Army
- Type: Infantry
- Garrison/HQ: Satsumasendai
- Nickname: Takashi (高師)
- Engagements: none

=== 308th division ===
308th Division
- 第308師団
- Active: 23 May 1945–1945
- Country: Empire of Japan
- Allegiance: 50th army
- Branch: Imperial Japanese Army
- Type: Infantry
- Garrison/HQ: Noheji
- Nickname: Iwaki (岩木)
- Engagements: none

=== 312th division ===
312th Division
- 第312師団
- Active: 23 May 1945–1945
- Country: Empire of Japan
- Allegiance: 56th army
- Branch: Imperial Japanese Army
- Type: Infantry
- Garrison/HQ: Imari
- Nickname: Chitose (千歳)
- Engagements: none

=== 316th division ===
316th Division
- 第316師団
- Active: 23 May 1945–1945
- Country: Empire of Japan
- Allegiance: 53rd army
- Branch: Imperial Japanese Army
- Type: Infantry
- Garrison/HQ: Isehara
- Nickname: Yamashiro (山城)
- Engagements: none

=== 320th division ===
320th Division
- 第320師団
- Active: 23 May 1945–1945
- Country: Empire of Japan
- Allegiance: 17th area army
- Branch: Imperial Japanese Army
- Type: Infantry
- Garrison/HQ: Wonsan
- Nickname: Senbu (宣武)
- Engagements: none

The 320th division has completed organization 25 July 1945 in Daegu, performing a police duties from Daegu to Seoul. After the start of the Soviet invasion of Manchuria 9 August 1945, the 320th division was ordered to move north to Wonsan, but did not complete the move due to the surrender of Japan 15 August 1945.

==== Notes ====
- This section incorporates material from Japanese Wikipedia page 第320師団 (日本軍), accessed 22 July 2016

=== 321st division ===
321st Division
- 第321師団
- Active: 23 May 1945–1945
- Country: Empire of Japan
- Allegiance: 12th area army
- Branch: Imperial Japanese Army
- Type: Infantry
- Garrison/HQ: Izu Ōshima
- Nickname: Iso (磯)
- Engagements: none

=== 322nd division ===
322nd Division
- 第322師団
- Active: 23 May 1945–1945
- Country: Empire of Japan
- Allegiance: 11th area army
- Branch: Imperial Japanese Army
- Type: Infantry
- Garrison/HQ: Iwanuma
- Nickname: Bandai (磐梯)
- Engagements: none

=== 344th division ===
344th Division
- 第344師団
- Active: 23 May 1945–1945
- Country: Empire of Japan
- Allegiance: 55th army
- Branch: Imperial Japanese Army
- Type: Infantry
- Garrison/HQ: South-west Shikoku
- Nickname: Mount Tsurugi (剣山)
- Engagements: none

=== 351st division ===
351st Division
- 第351師団
- Active: 23 May 1945–1945
- Country: Empire of Japan
- Allegiance: 56th army
- Branch: Imperial Japanese Army
- Type: Infantry
- Garrison/HQ: Fukuoka
- Nickname: Akagi (赤城)
- Engagements: none

=== 354th division ===
354th Division
- 第354師団
- Active: 23 May 1945–1945
- Country: Empire of Japan
- Allegiance: Army of Tokyo Bay
- Branch: Imperial Japanese Army
- Type: Infantry
- Garrison/HQ: Maruyama
- Nickname: Bukō (那智)
- Engagements: none

=== 355th division ===
355th Division
- 第355師団
- Active: 23 May 1945–1945
- Country: Empire of Japan
- Allegiance: 54th army
- Branch: Imperial Japanese Army
- Type: Infantry
- Garrison/HQ: Himeji
- Nickname: Nachi (那智)
- Engagements: none

== See also ==
- List of Japanese Infantry Divisions

== Notes and references ==
- This article incorporates material from Japanese Wikipedia page 本土決戦第三次兵備, accessed 20 July 2016
- Madej, W. Victor, Japanese Armed Forces Order of Battle, 1937–1945 [2 vols], Allentown, PA: 1981.
