= Independent Mixed Brigades =

Independent Mixed Brigades 独立混成旅団
- Active: 1937–1945
- Country: Empire of Japan
- Branch: Japanese Imperial Army
- Type: Mixed Brigade
- Role: Occupation forces
- Size: 5,000 to 11,000 troops
- Engagements: Second Sino-Japanese War; World War II

Between 1937 and 1945 the Japanese Imperial Army formed 126 Independent Mixed Brigades (numbered 1–136 with some gaps), typically composed of various units detached from other formations. Some were composed of separate, independent assets (usually Independent Infantry Battalions). These brigades were task organized under unified command and were normally used in support roles, as security, force protection, POW and internment camp guards and labor in occupied territories. An Independent Mixed Brigade had between 5,000 and 11,000 troops.

== History ==
The first two of these Independent Mixed Brigades formed by the Kwantung Army in the 1930s were the IJA 1st Independent Mixed Brigade and the IJA 11th Independent Mixed Brigade. Each of these brigades was organized in a unique manner; the 1st was disbanded in 1937 while the 11th was formed into the IJA 26th Division in 1938.

Later a series of Independent Mixed Brigades were formed for the purpose of garrisoning the large territories of China captured in the early phase of the Second Sino-Japanese War. This variety for China was usually organized with five infantry battalions, an artillery unit, and labor troops. In the Pacific theater they had different and more varied configurations of subordinate units.

The Hong Kong Defence Force, which was established in 1942 to occupy Hong Kong, was equivalent to an Independent Mixed Brigade.

== List of Independent Mixed Brigades ==
=== Kwantung Army ===
- IJA 1st Independent Mixed Brigade (posted at Chichi-jima)
- IJA 11th Independent Mixed Brigade (became 26th division)

=== Brigades formed for the Second Sino-Japanese War and Pacific War ===
| Number | Timeline | Notes |
|---|---|---|
| 1 | Taiyuan, 1937 – Iwo Jima, 1944 | - |
| 2 | Iwo Jima, 1944 | split from 109th division |
| 3 | North China, 1941–1945, 1st Army | - |
| 4 | Taiyuan, 1943 | became 62nd division |
| 5 | Shandong, 1939–1941, 12th Army | - |
| 6 | Taiyuan, 1941–1943, 12th Army | became 62nd division |
| 7 | 1941, 12th army – 1944, Henan | became 115th division |
| 8 | North China, 1941 – Chengde, 1945 | - |
| 9 | North China, 1941 | - |
| 10 | Jinan, 1941, 12th Army | - |
| 11 | Taiyuan, 1937; Battle of West Henan–North Hubei, 1945 | 2 separate units, formed in 1937 and 1939 |
| 12 | Taiyuan, 1937, Chuzhou, 1939 | - |
| 13 | Lu'an, 1943 | became 65th Division |
| 14 | Jiangxi, 1942 | became 68th Division |
| 15 | Taiyuan, 1937 | - |
| 16 | Linfen, 1942 | became 69th Division |
| 17 | 1941, 13th Army – 1945, 6th Area Army | - |
| 18 | Dangyang, 1940 | - |
| 19 | Guangzhou, 1941, 23rd Army | became 129th and 130th Divisions |
| 20 | Ningbo, 1942 | became 70th Division |
| 21 | French Indochina, 1941 | detached from 104th Division |
| 22 | Guangzhou, 1941, 23rd Army | - |
| 23 | 1945, 23rd Army | - |
| 24 | Myitkyina, 1944 | - |
| 25 | Sumatra, January 1944, 25th Army | - |
| 26 | south Sumatra, January 1944, 25th Army – Singapore, May 1945 | - |
| 27 | Jakarta, 1944, 16th Army | Taiwan mixed brigade |
| 28 | eastern Java, 1944, 16th Army | - |
| 29 | Bangkok, December 1943 – Prachuap Khiri Khan Province, August 1944 | - |
| 30 | Shanghai, 1943 – Mindanao, 1944 | became 100th Division |
| 31 | Bohol, June 1944 | became 102nd Division |
| 32 | Baguio, July 1943 | became 103rd Division |
| 33 | Luzon, 1944 | became 105th Division |
| 34 | Nanjing, 1943 – Saigon, 1944 | - |
| 35 | Tokyo, 1944 – Andaman Islands, 1945, 29th Army | do not confuse with Kawaguchi Detachment |
| 36 | Tokyo, 1944 – Nicobar Islands, 1945, 29th Army | - |
| 37 | Osaka, 1944 – Malaysia, 1945, 29th Army | - |
| 38 | Bouganville, 1944 | - |
| 39 | Solomon Islands, 1944 – 1945, 41st Army | - |
| 40 | Solomon Islands, 1944 | - |
| 43 | Iturup, 1945 | became 89th Division |
| 44 | Okinawa, 1945 | - |
| 45 | Okinawa, 1945 | - |
| 46 | Taipei, 1944 | became 66th Division |
| 47 | Saipan, 1944 | - |
| 48 | Guam, As Sombreru Pillboxes, 1944 | - |
| 49 | Palau minor islands, Yap and Fais Island, May 1944 | - |
| 50 | Woleai | - |
| 51 | Chuuk Lagoon, Mortlock Islands | - |
| 52 | Ponape Island, May 1944 | - |
| 53 | Palau Islands | - |
| 54 | Leyte, 1944, 14th Area Army | - |
| 55 | Leyte, 1944, 14th Area Army | - |
| 56 | Borneo, 1944 | - |
| 57 | Jolo, 1944 | - |
| 58 | Luzon, 1944, 14th area army | split from 47th Division |
| 59 | Okinawa, 1945 | - |
| 60 | Mudanjiang, August 1944 – Miyako-jima, September 1944 | - |
| 61 | China, 1944 – Taiwan, August 1944 – Luzon, 1944, 14th Area Army – July 1945, Babuyan Islands, 10th Area Army | - |
| 62 | Fuzhou, 1944 | - |
| 64 | Yamaguchi, 1944 – Amami Ōshima, 1945 | - |
| 65 | Hiroshima, 1941 – Guadalcanal, 1942 – Rabaul, 1944 | - |
| 66 | 1945, 6th army – August 1945, Nii-jima, 12th Area Army | - |
| 67 | August 1945, Hachijō-jima, 12th Area Army | - |
| 68 | Keelung, July 1944 – Leyte, December 1944 | - |
| 69 | Hokkaido, 1945 | became 89th Division |
| 70 | Saigon, December 1944 – Malaysia, 1945, 29th Army | |
| 71 | Kota Kinabalu, May 1944 – Kuching, February 1945 | - |
| 72 | Thanbyuzayat, 1944 | - |
| 73 | Sunwu County, October 1944 | became 123rd Division |
| 75 | Hengchun, 26 October 1944 – Penghu, January 1945, 40th army – Hsinchu, June 1945 | forced beaching at Hengchun |
| 76 | Keelung, January 1945, 10th Area Army | - |
| 77 | Taiwan, 1944 | became 135th Division |
| 78 | Jiamusi, July 1945 | became 134th Division |
| 79 | Mudanjiang, March 1945, 3rd Area Army | - |
| 80 | Hailar, April 1945 – Jalainur, August 1945, 4th Army | - |
| 81 | Xiangtan, March 1945, 20th Army | - |
| 82 | Zhuzhou, March 1945, 20th Army | - |
| 83 | Hankou, March 1945, 6th Area Army | - |
| 84 | Jiujiang, March 1945, 6th Area Army | - |
| 85 | Yingcheng, March 1945, 6th Area Army | - |
| 86 | Xiangxi, April 1945, 20th Army | - |
| 87 | Hengyang, April 1945, 20th Army | - |
| 88 | Guangxi, April 1945, 11th Army | - |
| 89 | Jinhua, August 1944 – Fenghua, August 1945, 6th Army | split from 60th Division |
| 90 | Yangzhou, February 1945, 10th army or 13th Army | contradictory data |
| 91 | Ningbo, February 1944, 6th Army | - |
| 92 | Datong, February 1945, 13th Army – Xuzhou, August 1945 | - |
| 95 | Hachinohe, 1945, 50th Army | - |
| 96 | 6 February 1945, Tokyo – August 1945, Tateyama, Army of Tokyo Bay | - |
| 97 | Fujieda, Shizuoka, 1945, 54th Army | - |
| 98 | Koyama, 1945, 57th Army | - |
| 100 | Kaohsiung, 1945, 10th Area Army | - |
| 101 | Shibetsu, February 1945 – Hayakita, Hokkaido, 7 May 1945, 5th Area Army | assigned to 77th Division, 11 February 1945 |
| 102 | Hualien, February 1945, 10th Area Army | split from 66th Division |
| 103 | Kaohsiung, February 1945, 10th Area Army – Taipei, May 1945 | - |
| 105 | Yangon, February 1945 | - |
| 107 | Gotō, Nagasaki, 1945, 16th Area Army | - |
| 108 | Jejudo, April 1945, 58th Army | - |
| 109 | Tanegashima, 1945, 57th Army | - |
| 112 | Yilan, April 1945, 10th Area Army | - |
| 113 | Iwaki, 1945, 11th Area Army | - |
| 114 | 23 May 1945, Nagano- August 1945, Yokosuka, Army of Tokyo Bay | - |
| 115 | Shibasaki, 1945, 51st Army | - |
| 116 | Hokota, 1945, 51st Army | - |
| 117 | Numazu, Shizuoka, 1945, 53rd Army | - |
| 118 | Saiki, Ōita, 1945, 16th Area Army | - |
| 119 | Shizuoka, Shizuoka, 1945, 54th Army | - |
| 120 | Shimizu, Shizuoka, 1945, 54th Army | - |
| 121 | Gobō, Wakayama, 1945, 15th Area Army – Tokushima, August 1945, 55th Army | replaced by 123rd Independent Mixed Brigade in Gobō |
| 122 | Nagasaki, 1945, 16th Area Army | - |
| 123 | Gobō, Wakayama, 23 May 1945, 15th Area Army | - |
| 124 | Shimonoseki, 1945, 59th Army | - |
| 125 | Ibusuki, Kagoshima, May 1945, 40th Army | - |
| 126 | Amakusa, 1945, 16th Area Army | - |
| 127 | Busan, May 1945 – Ulsan, August 1945 | - |
| 128 | north-east Halmahera, May 1945 | - |
| 129 | Urup, 1945 | split from 42nd Division |
| 130 | Liaoning, July 1945, 3rd Area Army | - |
| 131 | Harbin, July 1945, 4th army | - |
| 132 | Dongning, July 1945, 3rd Army | assigned to 128th division, August 1945 |
| 133 | Siping, July 1945, 34th Army | - |
| 134 | Jinzhou, July 1945, 3rd Area Army – Linjiang, August 1945 | assigned to 125th Division |
| 135 | Aihui, July 1945, 4th Army | - |
| 136 | Nencheng, July 1945 – Qiqihar, August 1945, 4th Army | - |

- (list is believed to be complete)
Japanese infantry and armored units in Home Islands, 15 August 1945

== See also ==
- List of Japanese Infantry divisions
- List of IJA Mixed Brigades

== Bibliography ==
- Victor Madej: Japanese Armed Forces Order of Battle, 1937–1945. Game Publishing, 1981, OCLC 833591372, OCLC 833591376.
- Philip Jowett: The Japanese Army 1931–45 (1) Osprey Publishing, 2002, ISBN 978-1-8417-6353-8
- Gordon Rottman: Japanese Army in World War II, Conquest of the Pacific Osprey Publishing, 2005, ISBN 978-1-8417-6789-5
- Gordon Rottman: Japanese Army in World War II, The South Pacific and New Guinea, 1942–43 Osprey Publishing, 2005, ISBN 978-1-8417-6870-0
