= 110th Division (Imperial Japanese Army) =

- Active: 1937 - 1946
- Country: Empire of Japan
- Branch: Imperial Japanese Army
- Type: Infantry
- Garrison/HQ: Himeji
- Nickname: Eagle division
- Engagements: Battle of Shanghai; Operation Ichi-Go; Battle of West Henan–North Hubei

The 110th Division (第110師団, Dai-hyakujū Shidan) was an infantry division of the Imperial Japanese Army. Its call sign was the Eagle Division (鷲兵団, Sagi Heidan). It was formed 16 June 1937 in Himeji as a B-class square division. The nucleus for the formation was the 10th division headquarters. It was originally subordinated to the Northern China Area Army.

== Action ==
10 July 1937 the 110th division departed Ujina port (Hiroshima), and landed in Tanggu District on 14 July 1937. In December 1937, the 110th division participated in fighting at Suzhou Creek, a part of the Battle of Shanghai. During that period, the division was mostly deployed on the north of Hebei province with the headquarters in Tianjin. In January 1938, the headquarters were moved to Baoding and zone of responsibility changed to the southern part of Hebei province. From April 1938, the division was further relocated to Shijiazhuang, mostly guarding the Beijing–Guangzhou Railway.

As Japanese forces were stretched thin, the 110th division participated in numerous and ultimately unsuccessful anti-guerilla operations against the Shanxi-Chahar-Hebei Communist Stronghold in North China. The 140th infantry regiment was transferred to 71st division in April–May 1942, transforming the 110th division into a triangular division.

During Operation Ichi-Go in March 1944 the 110th division captured Luoyang, and from July 1944 was garrisoned there, operating under command of the 12th army. In April 1945, it also acted in the Battle of West Henan–North Hubei. The division returned to Luoyang and Ye County, staying there until the surrender of Japan on 15 August 1945.

In March 1946, the 110th division gathered in Shanghai. The first troops left Shanghai on 26 March 1946 and arrived at Fukuoka on 31 March 1946. The second batch departed from Shanghai on 29 March 1946 and arrived at Fukuoka on 2 April 1946. The next batch departed from Shanghai on 6 April 1946 and landed in Sasebo on 11 April 1946. The last parts of the division sailed off on 27 April 1946 and arrived at Fukuoka on 3 May 1946. The dissolution of the 110th division was complete by 9 September 1946.

== See also ==
- List of Japanese Infantry Divisions

== Notes ==
- This article incorporates material from Japanese Wikipedia page 第110師団 (日本軍), accessed 16 June 2016
