= 72nd Division (Imperial Japanese Army) =

- 第72師団
- Active: 1944–1945
- Country: Empire of Japan
- Allegiance: Japanese Eleventh Area Army
- Branch: Imperial Japanese Army
- Type: Infantry
- Role: Coastal defense
- Nickname(s): Summon Division
- Engagements: none

The 72nd Division (第72師団, Dai-nanajūni Shidan) was an infantry division in the Imperial Japanese Army. Its call sign was the Summon Division (伝兵団, Ten Heidan). It was created 4 April 1944 in Sendai to replace 43rd division and disbanded in September 1945 in Fukushima. It was a triangular division. The men of the division were drafted through 2nd military district, located in Sendai.

== Action ==
After completing the training with the Eastern District Army, the 72nd division was attached to Japanese Eleventh Area Army from 1 February 1945 and sent to Fukushima. By the time of surrender of Japan in August 1945, the division was sent again to reinforce positions in Aomori in anticipation of the Allied invasion which never came.

Japanese infantry and armored units in Home Islands, 15 August 1945

== See also ==
- List of Japanese Infantry Divisions
- Independent Mixed Brigades (Imperial Japanese Army)

== Notes and references ==
This article incorporates material from the article 第72師団 (日本軍) in the Japanese Wikipedia, retrieved on 14 January 2015.

- Madej, W. Victor. Japanese Armed Forces Order of Battle, 1937-1945 [2 vols] Allentown, PA: 1981
