= 71st Division (Imperial Japanese Army) =

- 第71師団
- Active: 1942 - 1945
- Country: Empire of Japan
- Allegiance: Fortieth Army (Japan)
- Branch: Imperial Japanese Army
- Type: Infantry
- Role: garrison
- Nickname(s): Life Division
- Engagements: Second Sino-Japanese War; Pacific War

Commanders
- Notable commanders: Tenba Umahachi (天羽馬八)

The 71st Division (第71師団, Dai-nanajūichi Shidan) was an infantry division in the Imperial Japanese Army. Its call sign was the Life Division (命兵団, Mikoto Heidan). It was created 16 April 1942 in Hunchun and disbanded in September 1945 in Taiwan. It was a triangular division. The men of the division were drafted through 7th military district, located in Hokkaido.

== Action ==
After the training was completed in June 1942, the division was subordinated to the Kwantung Army and sent to the eastern part of the Soviet border in Manchuria.

=== Division split ===
In February 1944, according to order number 948, the divisional headquarters and several infantry battalions (total about 2150 or 3000 men) were split and sent to Pagan Island, departing from Pusan 3 March 1944 and arriving to Pagan Island 18 March 1944. Also at the same time, one battalion of the 140th infantry regiment was sent to the Kuril Islands. In July 1944, remnants of the division was swapped with the 10th division, leaving the borderland. In January 1945, the division was ordered to Taiwan, arriving in February 1945 in Chiayi County. The regiments were subordinated to the 10th area army (and to the 40th army in time it was based on Taiwan in early 1945). Due to reorganization of the coastal defense, the infantry regiments were disbanded and used to reinforce other units. The Allies never invaded Taiwan, but the division suffered heavy casualties due to malaria, with an 80% casualty rate in the worst-affected 88th Infantry regiment. Following the Surrender of Japan, the majority of personnel were returned from Taiwan to mainland Japan in the first half of 1946.

=== Garrison of Pagan Island ===
The five detachments of the 71st division become the 9th Independent Mixed Regiment in late February 1944, landing on Pagan Island on 20 March 1944 after sailing from Hunchun. Reorganized later as garrison group 17583, it continued to defend Pagan until the surrender of Japan. Although never invaded, the garrison suffered from severe food shortages and daily air raids. Several hundred soldiers died because of malnutrition before the garrison was evacuated to mainland Japan in late October 1945.

=== Further detachments ===
An elements of 71st division comprising an 34th anti-aircraft battalion and the battalion from 71st mountain artillery regiment, were further detached and sailed from Kaohsiung 3 December 1944, only to be sunk by USS Segundo (SS-398) submarine 6 December 1944 with the nearly total loss of life.

== See also ==
- List of Japanese Infantry Divisions
- Independent Mixed Brigades (Imperial Japanese Army)

== Notes and references ==
This article incorporates material from the article 第71師団 (日本軍)|第71師団 (日本軍) in the Japanese Wikipedia, retrieved on 13 January 2015.

- Madej, W. Victor. Japanese Armed Forces Order of Battle, 1937-1945 [2 vols] Allentown, PA: 1981
- 秦郁彦編『日本陸海軍総合事典』第2版、東京大学出版会、2005年。
- 外山操・森松俊夫編著『帝国陸軍編制総覧』芙蓉書房出版、1987年。
- 『別冊歴史読本 戦記シリーズNo.32 太平洋戦争師団戦史』、新人物往来社、1996年。
- 示村貞夫『旭川第七師団』新北海、1984年。
