= 73rd Division (Imperial Japanese Army) =

- 第73師団
- Active: 1944–1945
- Country: Empire of Japan
- Allegiance: Japanese Thirteenth Area Army
- Branch: Imperial Japanese Army
- Type: Infantry
- Role: Coastal defense
- Nickname(s): Wrath Division
- Engagements: none

Commanders
- Notable commanders: Nonoyama Hidemi (野々山秀美)

The 73rd Division (第79師団, Dai-nanajūsan Shidan) was an infantry division in the Imperial Japanese Army. Its call sign was the Wrath Division (怒兵団, Ikari Heidan). It was created in July 1944 in Nagoya and disbanded 23 September 1945 in Toyohashi. It was a triangular division. The men of the division were drafted through 3rd military district, located in Nagoya.

== Action ==
Initially the division was guarding the coast of Suruga Bay, excluding Chita Peninsula. Later the zone of responsibility was shifted to between Toyohashi and Lake Hamana. After completing the training with the Central District Army, the 73rd division was attached to Japanese Thirteenth Area Army from 1 February 1945. The division spent the time until surrender of Japan 15 August 1945 fortifying in anticipation of the Allied invasion which never came.

Japanese infantry and armored units in Home Islands, 15 August 1945

== See also ==
- List of Japanese Infantry Divisions
- Independent Mixed Brigades (Imperial Japanese Army)

== Notes and references ==
This article incorporates material from the article 第73師団 (日本軍) in the Japanese Wikipedia, retrieved on 14 January 2016.

- Madej, W. Victor. Japanese Armed Forces Order of Battle, 1937-1945 [2 vols] Allentown, PA: 1981
- Hata Ikuhiko, ed. "日本陸海軍総合事典 第2版" (Comprehensive Encyclopedia of the Imperial Japanese Navy and Army, Second Edition), Tōkyō Daigaku Shuppankai, 2005.
- Toyama Misao and Morimatsu Toshio, eds. "帝国陸軍編制総覧" (Comprehensive Sourcebook on Imperial Army Units), Fuyōshobō, 1987.
- 『別冊歴史読本 戦記シリーズNo.32 太平洋戦争師団戦史』 (Special Edition of Rekishi Yomihon: War History Series No.32 – Battle History of Pacific War Divisions), Shin Jinbutsu Ōraisha, 1996.
