= 96th Division (Imperial Japanese Army) =

- 第96師団
- Active: 1945 - 1945
- Country: Empire of Japan
- Allegiance: 58th army
- Branch: Imperial Japanese Army
- Type: Infantry
- Size: 9000
- Garrison/HQ: Seoul
- Nickname: Mistery 22001
- Engagements: none

The 96th Division (第96師団, Dai-kyūjūroku Shidan) was an infantry division in the Imperial Japanese Army. Its call sign was the Mistery 22001 Division (玄22001兵団, Gen 22001 Heidan). It was created 6 February 1945 in Seoul. The nucleus for the formation was the headquarters and training camps of the 56th division and 84th infantry brigade. It was nominally a triangular division.

== Action ==
The 96th division was assigned to 17th area army 10 February 1945. Although it was planned initially to raise a brigade, the plans were suddenly changed to division during the formation. Due to equipment shortage, the division was severely understrength and a numerous substitutions were made. In particular, mortar battalion was actually equipped with the anti-aircraft machine guns.

The formed 96th division was sent to the north of Jeju Island in April 1945, and reassigned to 58th army. It absorbed that time a 32nd independent infantry battalion plus independent automatic cannon company, and received a complement of the anti-tank guns.

Tasked with fortification building in Jeju Island, the 96th division was subject to the attacks by local guerilla and frequent air raids, but was not invaded until surrender of Japan 15 August 1945.

== References and further reading ==
- List of Japanese Infantry Divisions
- Madej, W. Victor. Japanese Armed Forces Order of Battle, 1937-1945 [2 vols] Allentown, PA: 1981

This article incorporates material from the article 第96師団 (日本軍) in the Japanese Wikipedia, retrieved on 24 June 2016.
