= 143rd Division (Imperial Japanese Army) =

- 第143師団
- Active: 1945–1945
- Country: Empire of Japan
- Allegiance: 54th army
- Branch: Imperial Japanese Army
- Type: Infantry
- Size: 10000
- Garrison/HQ: Hamamatsu
- Nickname: Nagoya protection division
- Engagements: none

The 143rd Division (第143師団, Dai-hyakuyonjūsan Shidan) was an infantry division of the Imperial Japanese Army. Its call sign was the Nagoya Protection Division (護仙兵団, Kogo Heidan). It was formed 28 February 1945 in Nagoya as a square division. It was a part of the 16 simultaneously created divisions batch numbering from 140th to 160th.

== Action ==
Initially, the 143rd division was assigned to the 13th area army. In June 1945, it was reassigned to 54th army.

The 143rd division headquarters was located at Hamamatsu. It was tasked with the coastal defense. The division did not see any combat until surrender of Japan 15 August 1945.

== See also ==
- List of Japanese Infantry Divisions
Japanese infantry and armored units in Home Islands, 15 August 1945

== Notes and references ==
- This article incorporates material from Japanese Wikipedia page 第143師団 (日本軍), accessed 13 July 2016
- Madej, W. Victor, Japanese Armed Forces Order of Battle, 1937–1945 [2 vols], Allentown, PA: 1981.
