= 84th Division (Imperial Japanese Army) =

- 第84師団
- Active: 1944 - 1945
- Country: Empire of Japan
- Branch: Imperial Japanese Army
- Type: Infantry
- Nickname: Sudden division
- Engagements: none

The 84th Division (第84師団, Dai-hachijūyon Shidan) was an infantry division in the Imperial Japanese Army. Its call sign was the Sudden Division (突兵団, Tō Heidan).It was created July 6, 1944 in Himeji. It was a triangular division. The divisional backbone was the 54th Division headquarters.

The 84th Division was assigned to the Central District Army upon formation. In the late 1944, the division was considered for sending to Okinawa, but the 62nd Division was selected instead.

In April 1945, the 84th Division was assigned to the 53rd Army, taking a positions in Odawara, Kanagawa. The division then spent the time building a fortifications until being demobilized in September 1945, after the surrender of Japan.

Japanese infantry and armored units in Home Islands, 15 August 1945

== References and further reading ==
- Madej, W. Victor. Japanese Armed Forces Order of Battle, 1937-1945 [2 vols] Allentown, Pennsylvania: 1981

This article incorporates material from the article 第84師団 (日本軍) in the Japanese Wikipedia, retrieved on 21 June 2016.

== See also ==
- List of Japanese Infantry Divisions
