= 146th Division (Imperial Japanese Army) =

- 第146師団
- Active: 1945–1945
- Country: Empire of Japan
- Allegiance: 40th army
- Branch: Imperial Japanese Army
- Type: Infantry
- Size: 10000
- Garrison/HQ: Kagoshima Prefecture
- Nickname: South protection division
- Engagements: none

The 146th Division (第146師団, Dai-hyakuyonjūroku Shidan) was an infantry division of the Imperial Japanese Army. Its call sign was the Southern Protection Division (護南兵団, Konan Heidan). It was formed 28 February 1945 in Kumamoto as a square division. It was a part of the 16 simultaneously created divisions batch numbering from 140th to 160th.

== Action ==
Initially, the 146th division was assigned to the 57th army. After the 40th army was transferred from Taiwan to Kyushu, the division was reassigned to it and sent to Kagoshima Prefecture

The 146th division was tasked with the coastal defense. The division did not see any combat until surrender of Japan 15 August 1945.

Japanese infantry and armored units in Home Islands, 15 August 1945

== See also ==
- List of Japanese Infantry Divisions

== Notes and references ==
- This article incorporates material from Japanese Wikipedia page 第146師団 (日本軍), accessed 13 July 2016
- Madej, W. Victor, Japanese Armed Forces Order of Battle, 1937–1945 [2 vols], Allentown, PA: 1981.
