= 142nd Division (Imperial Japanese Army) =

- 第142師団
- Active: 1945–1945
- Country: Empire of Japan
- Allegiance: 11th area army
- Branch: Imperial Japanese Army
- Type: Infantry
- Size: 10000
- Garrison/HQ: Sendai
- Nickname: Sendai protection division
- Engagements: none

The 142nd Division (第142師団, Dai-hyakuyonjūni Shidan) was an infantry division of the Imperial Japanese Army. Its call sign was the Sendai Protection Division (護仙兵団, Kosen Heidan). It was formed 28 February 1945 in Sendai as a square division. It was a part of the 16 simultaneously created divisions batch numbering from 140th to 160th.

== Action ==
The 142nd division headquarters was located at Yoshoka-machi (now Kurokawa District). It was tasked with the defence of the coasts in Sendai Bay and Ishinomaki Bay. 407th infantry regiment was severely understrength. The division did not see any combat until surrender of Japan 15 August 1945.

== See also ==
- List of Japanese Infantry Divisions
Japanese infantry and armored units in Home Islands, 15 August 1945

== Notes and references ==
- This article incorporates material from Japanese Wikipedia page 第142師団 (日本軍), accessed 12 July 2016
- Madej, W. Victor, Japanese Armed Forces Order of Battle, 1937–1945 [2 vols], Allentown, PA: 1981.
