= 154th Division (Imperial Japanese Army) =

- 第154師団
- Active: 1945–1945
- Country: Empire of Japan
- Allegiance: 57th army
- Branch: Imperial Japanese Army
- Type: Infantry
- Size: 10000
- Garrison/HQ: Miyazaki Prefecture
- Nickname: Himeji protection division
- Engagements: none

The 154th Division (第154師団, Dai-hyakugojūyon Shidan) was an infantry division of the Imperial Japanese Army. Its call sign was the Himeji Protection Division (護路兵団, Goji Heidan). It was formed on 28 February 1945, in Hiroshima as a square division. It was a part of the 16 simultaneously created divisions batch numbering from 140th to 160th.

== Action ==
The 154th division was assigned to 57th army. The division spent time from 5 May 1945 until surrender of Japan 15 August 1945 building a coastal defenses in Saito, Miyazaki without engaging in actual combat.

== See also ==
- List of Japanese Infantry Divisions
Japanese infantry and armored units in Home Islands, 15 August 1945

== Notes and references ==
- This article incorporates material from Japanese Wikipedia page 第154師団 (日本軍), accessed 13 July 2016
- Madej, W. Victor, Japanese Armed Forces Order of Battle, 1937–1945 [2 vols], Allentown, PA: 1981.
