= 153rd Division (Imperial Japanese Army) =

- 第153師団
- Active: 1945–1945
- Country: Empire of Japan
- Allegiance: 13th area army
- Branch: Imperial Japanese Army
- Type: Infantry
- Size: 10,000
- Garrison/HQ: Ise
- Nickname: Kyoto protection division
- Engagements: none

The 153rd Division (第153師団, Dai-hyakugojūsan Shidan) was an infantry division of the Imperial Japanese Army. Its call sign was the Kyoto Protection Division (護京兵団, Gokyo Heidan). It was formed 28 February 1945 in Kyoto as a square division. It was a part of the 16 simultaneously created divisions batch numbering from 140th to 160th.

== Action ==
The 153rd division was assigned to the 13th area army. The division spent time from 5 May 1945 until the surrender of Japan 15 August 1945 building coastal defenses without engaging in actual combat.

The 441st infantry regiment was located at the Atsumi Peninsula, the 442nd and 443rd at Ise-Shima, and the 444th infantry regiment at Ise.

== See also ==
- List of Japanese Infantry Divisions
Japanese infantry and armored units in Home Islands, 15 August 1945

== Notes and references ==
- This article incorporates material from Japanese Wikipedia page 第153師団 (日本軍), accessed 13 July 2016
- Madej, W. Victor, Japanese Armed Forces Order of Battle, 1937–1945 [2 vols], Allentown, PA: 1981.
