= 160th Division (Imperial Japanese Army) =

- 第160師団
- Active: 1945–1945
- Country: Empire of Japan
- Allegiance: 17th area army
- Branch: Imperial Japanese Army
- Type: Infantry
- Size: 10000
- Garrison/HQ: North Jeolla Province
- Nickname: Pyongyang protection division
- Engagements: none

The 160th Division (第160師団, Dai-hyakurokujū Shidan) was an infantry division of the Imperial Japanese Army. Its call sign was the Chosun Protection Division (護鮮兵団, Gosen Heidan). It was formed 28 February 1945 in Pyongyang as a square division. It was a part of the 16 simultaneously created divisions batch numbering from 140th to 160th.

== Action ==
The 160th division was assigned to 17th area army. 9 May 1945, the division was sent to North Jeolla Province to prepare a coastal defenses, performing uneventfully until surrender of Japan 15 August 1945. 461st infantry regiment was in Buan County, 462nd - in Gunsan, 463rd - in Seocheon County, and 464th infantry regiment - in Iksan.

== See also ==
- List of Japanese Infantry Divisions

== Notes and references ==
- This article incorporates material from Japanese Wikipedia page 第160師団 (日本軍), accessed 14 July 2016
- Madej, W. Victor, Japanese Armed Forces Order of Battle, 1937–1945 [2 vols], Allentown, PA: 1981.
