= 9th Division (Imperial Japanese Army) =

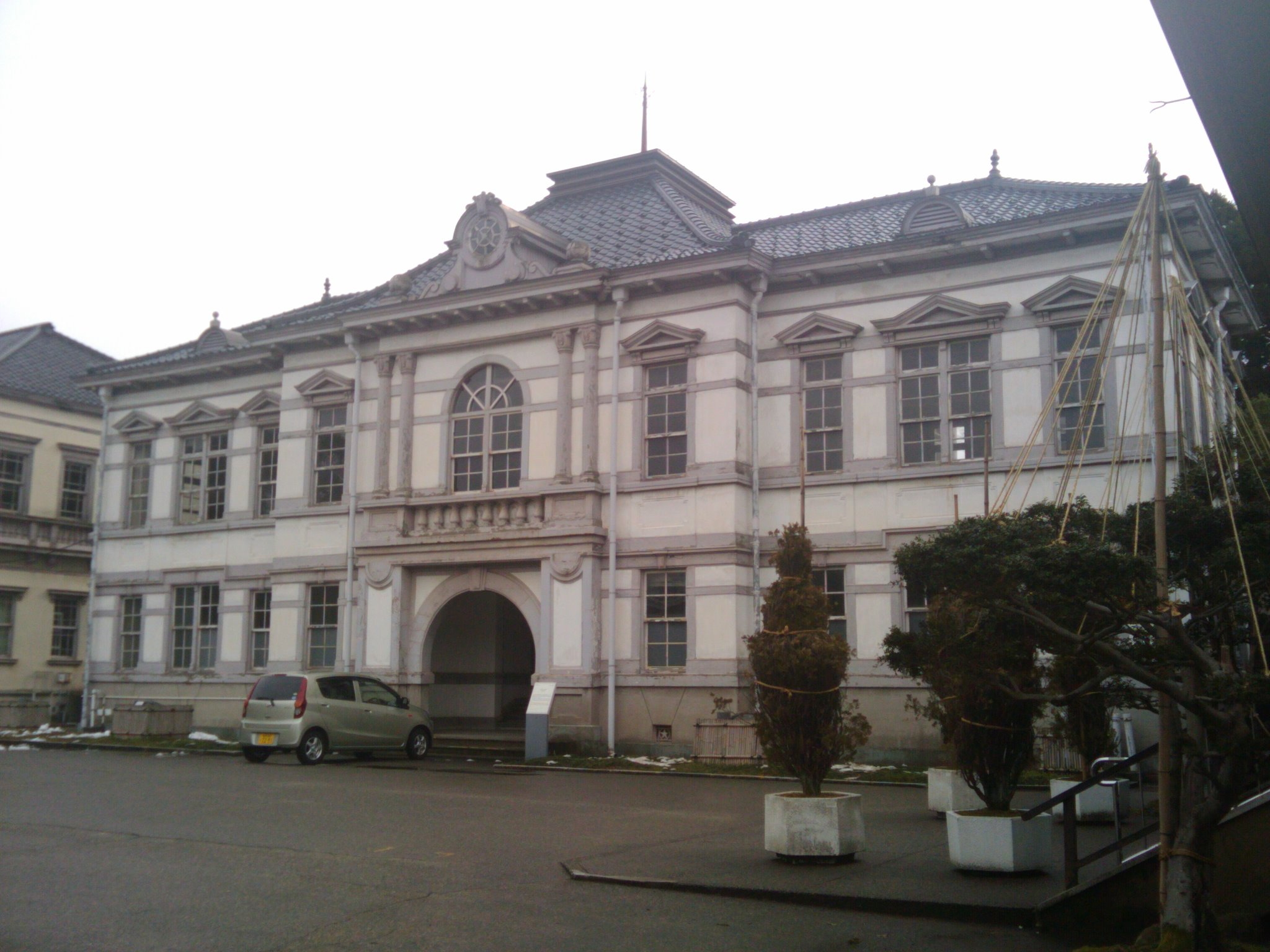
- 9th Division HQ at Kanazawa, Japan
- Active: 1 October 1898 – 1945
- Country: Empire of Japan
- Branch: Imperial Japanese Army
- Type: Infantry
- Garrison/HQ: Kanazawa, Ishikawa, Japan
- Nickname: Warrior Division
- Engagements: Russo-Japanese War; Japanese intervention in Siberia; Manchurian Incident; Second Sino-Japanese War; World War II

Commanders
- Notable commanders: Oshima Hisanao; Kenkichi Ueda; Kiichiro Higuchi

The 9th Division (第9師団, Dai-Kyū Shidan) was an infantry division in the Imperial Japanese Army. Its tsūshōgō code name was the Warrior Division (武兵団, Take-heidan) or 1515 or 1573. The 9th Division was one of six infantry divisions newly raised by the Imperial Japanese Army after the First Sino-Japanese War (1894–1895). Its troops were recruited primarily from communities in the Hokuriku region of Japan (Ishikawa, Toyama and Fukui, with its headquarters located within the grounds of Kanazawa Castle.

== Action ==
The division received its colors on 1 October 1898, and settled in Kanazawa Castle headquarters 29 November 1898.

=== Russo-Japanese War to January 28 Incident ===
The first commander of the 9th Division was Lieutenant General Ōshima Hisanao, who commanded the division as part of General Nogi Maresuke's Japanese Third Army in the Russo-Japanese War of 1904–1905. At the Siege of Port Arthur the division took massive casualties making repeated direct frontal assaults on fortified Russian positions, and lost all of its regimental commanders. Survivors were further mauled at the subsequent Battle of Mukden, and even the commander of the division's field artillery regiment was a casualty.

After the Russo-Japanese War, the division was assigned to garrison duty in Korea for two years, before being withdrawn to Japan. Its new divisional headquarters building within the moats of Kanazawa Castle was completed 30 April 1916. 12 June 1918, an ordnance department was incorporated into the division. Elements of the 9th Division participated in the Japanese intervention in Siberia against the Bolshevik forces in the Russian Civil War, starting deployment in 1921.

=== Second Sino-Japanese War ===
In January 1932, the division participated in the first January 28 Incident under the command of Lieutenant General Kenkichi Ueda, and from 1935 to February 1937, the division was stationed as a garrison force in Manchukuo, before been withdrawn to Japan.

The 9th Division was redeployed to China after the Marco Polo Bridge Incident, starting to move 11 September 1937 as part of the Shanghai Expeditionary Army together with 13th division and 101st division and participated in the Second Battle of Shanghai where it suffered a 94% casualty rate. The 9th division later participated in the subsequent drive inland to the Battle of Nanking. Troops from the division were also implicated in the subsequent Nanjing Massacre. From 14 February 1938, the division came under the command of the Central China Expeditionary Army and was in the Battle of Xuzhou. From 22 August 1938 the division was reassigned to the IJA 11th Army and fought at the Battle of Wuhan. In June 1939, the division was demobilized and ordered back to Japan.

In August 1940, the division was reorganized into a triangular division, with its IJA 36th Infantry Regiment transferred to the newly formed IJA 28th Division. Simultaneously, the division was permanently re-located to Manchukuo as garrison force responsible for border security and internal police duties, subordinated to 3rd army. The 52nd division took a responsibility for Hokuriku region of Japan instead of 9th division.

=== Pacific War ===
The 9th Division, under the command of Lieutenant General Kiichiro Higuchi, stayed in Manchukuo until the Battle of Saipan in July 1944. At that point, the 9th Division was reassigned to the IJA 32nd Army based in Okinawa. Under the direction of IJA 32nd Army strategist Colonel Hiromichi Yahara, the division located first at Shuri, Okinawa, but soon re-located to the village of Ōzato, in southern Okinawa Island. However, in December, the division was ordered to relocate again to Taipei under command of 40th army, as the Imperial General Headquarters decided that Taiwan was a more probable target for invasion than Okinawa. However, the Allies chose instead to bypass Taiwan, and invaded Okinawa in April 1945. The 9th Division thus escaped World War II intact, without having seen major action.

== Organization ==
When the 9th Division was first stood up it consisted of the 7th, 19th, 35th, and 36th Infantry Regiments. The 36th was later removed from the Division's organization when the Imperial Japanese Army unit organization changed from square divisions to triangle divisions. For cavalry the 9th Division was supported by the 9th Cavalry Regiment and for artillery the division was supported by the 9th Mountain Artillery Regiment.

== See also ==
- List of Japanese Infantry Divisions
