= 144th Division (Imperial Japanese Army) =

- 第144師団
- Active: 1945–1945
- Country: Empire of Japan
- Allegiance: 54th army
- Branch: Imperial Japanese Army
- Type: Infantry
- Size: 17000
- Garrison/HQ: Osaka
- Nickname: Osaka protection division
- Engagements: none

The 144th Division (第144師団, Dai-hyakuyonjūyon Shidan) was an infantry division of the Imperial Japanese Army. Its call sign was the Osaka Protection Division (護阪兵団, Kosaka Heidan). It was formed 28 February 1945 in Osaka as a square division. It was a part of the 16 simultaneously created divisions batch numbering from 140th to 160th.

== Action ==
Initially, the 144th division was assigned to the Second General Army. Later it was reassigned to 15th area army.

The 144th division headquarters was located at Osaka. It was tasked with the coastal defense. The division did not see any combat until surrender of Japan 15 August 1945.

== See also ==
- List of Japanese Infantry Divisions
Japanese infantry and armored units in Home Islands, 15 August 1945

== Notes and references ==
- This article incorporates material from Japanese Wikipedia page 第144師団 (日本軍), accessed 13 July 2016
- Madej, W. Victor, Japanese Armed Forces Order of Battle, 1937–1945 [2 vols], Allentown, PA: 1981.
