= 156th Division (Imperial Japanese Army) =

- 第156師団
- Active: 1945–1945
- Country: Empire of Japan
- Allegiance: 57th army
- Branch: Imperial Japanese Army
- Type: Infantry
- Size: 10000
- Garrison/HQ: Kunitomi
- Nickname: West protection division
- Engagements: none

The 156th Division (第156師団, Dai-hyakugojūroku Shidan) was an infantry division of the Imperial Japanese Army. Its call sign was the West Protection Division (護西兵団, Gosai Heidan). It was formed 28 February 1945 in Kurume, Fukuoka as a square division. It was a part of the 16 simultaneously created divisions batch numbering from 140th to 160th.

== Action ==
The 156th division was assigned to 57th army. The division spent time from 5 May 1945 until surrender of Japan 15 August 1945 building a coastal defenses in Miyazaki Prefecture without engaging in actual combat. The 453rd infantry regiment was in Sumiyoshi (between Miyazaki and Shintomi), the 454th - in Miyazaki proper, 455th - in Kiyotake (on southern outskirts of Miyazaki), and 456th infantry regiment - in Kunitomi inland.

== See also ==
- List of Japanese Infantry Divisions
Japanese infantry and armored units in Home Islands, 15 August 1945

== Notes and references ==
- This article incorporates material from Japanese Wikipedia page 第156師団 (日本軍), accessed 13 July 2016
- Madej, W. Victor, Japanese Armed Forces Order of Battle, 1937–1945 [2 vols], Allentown, PA: 1981.
