= 150th Division (Imperial Japanese Army) =

- 第150師団
- Active: 1945–1945
- Country: Empire of Japan
- Allegiance: 17th area army
- Branch: Imperial Japanese Army
- Type: Infantry
- Size: 14797
- Garrison/HQ: Jeongeup
- Nickname: Morning protection division
- Engagements: none

The 150th Division (第150師団, Dai-hyakugojū Shidan) was an infantry division of the Imperial Japanese Army. Its call sign was the Morning Protection Division (護朝兵団, Gocho Heidan). It was formed 28 February 1945 in Seoul as a square division. It was a part of the 16 simultaneously created divisions batch numbering from 140th to 160th.

== Action ==
From May 1945, the 150th division was tasked with the coastal defense of the North Jeolla Province and South Jeolla Province, with garrisons in Jeongeup (headquarters and barrage artillery), and 431st infantry regiment on Daejeon-ri island, and Jangseong County (429th infantry regiment and automatic cannon company). Also, the 430th, 432nd infantry regiments and the rest of units were deployed at Mokpo. After the Soviet invasion of Manchuria the division was ordered to move and by the time of surrender of Japan 15 August 1945 was in Gunsan.

== See also ==
- List of Japanese Infantry Divisions

== Notes and references ==
- This article incorporates material from Japanese Wikipedia page 第150師団 (日本軍), accessed 13 July 2016
- Madej, W. Victor, Japanese Armed Forces Order of Battle, 1937–1945 [2 vols], Allentown, PA: 1981.
