= 50th Division (Imperial Japanese Army) =

- Active: 1944–1945
- Country: Japan
- Branch: Imperial Japanese Army
- Type: Infantry
- Nickname: Artemisia division
- Engagements: none

The 50th Division (第50師団, Dai-gojū Shidan) was an infantry division of the Imperial Japanese Army. Its call sign was the Artemisia Division (蓬兵団, Hō Heidan). The 50th Division was activated in Taipei 3 May 1944, utilizing a building previously used by 48th division, and was one of only two Japanese divisions (together with 66th division) ever raised in Taiwan. The 50th division had employed the casualties of the 48th division transported back to Taiwan to form the divisional core.

The 50th division was permanently assigned to the Japanese Tenth Area Army (and to the 40th army in the time it was based on Taiwan in early 1945).

During the 1945, the 50th division had fortified in Kaohsiung on the south coast of Taiwan in anticipation of the Allies landing. It met the day of surrender of Japan 15 August 1945 without engaging in actual combat and was demobilized shortly afterwards.

== See also ==
- List of Japanese Infantry Divisions

== Notes ==
- This article incorporates material from Japanese Wikipedia page 第50師団 (日本軍), accessed 1 June 2016

== See also ==
- List of Japanese Infantry Divisions

== Reference and further reading ==
- Madej, W. Victor. Japanese Armed Forces Order of Battle, 1937-1945 [2 vols] Allentown, PA: 1981
