= 155th Division (Imperial Japanese Army) =

- 第155師団
- Active: 1945–1945
- Country: Empire of Japan
- Allegiance: 55th army
- Branch: Imperial Japanese Army
- Type: Infantry
- Size: 10000
- Garrison/HQ: Kami, Kōchi
- Nickname: Land protection division
- Engagements: none

The 155th Division (第155師団, Dai-hyakugojūgo Shidan) was an infantry division of the Imperial Japanese Army. Its call sign was the Land Protection Division (護土兵団, Godo Heidan). It was formed 28 February 1945 in Zentsūji, Kagawa as a square division. It was a part of the 16 simultaneously created divisions batch numbering from 140th to 160th.

== Action ==
The 155th division was assigned to 55th army. The division spent time from 5 May 1945 until surrender of Japan 15 August 1945 building a coastal defenses in and around Kami, Kōchi without engaging in actual combat.

== See also ==
- List of Japanese Infantry Divisions
Japanese infantry and armored units in Home Islands, 15 August 1945

== Notes and references ==
- This article incorporates material from Japanese Wikipedia page 第155師団 (日本軍), accessed 13 July 2016
- Madej, W. Victor, Japanese Armed Forces Order of Battle, 1937–1945 [2 vols], Allentown, PA: 1981.
