= 140th Division (Imperial Japanese Army) =

- 第140師団
- Active: 1945–1945
- Country: Empire of Japan
- Allegiance: 53rd army
- Branch: Imperial Japanese Army
- Type: Infantry
- Size: 17000
- Garrison/HQ: Kamakura
- Nickname: Tokyo protection division
- Engagements: none

The 140th Division (第140師団, Dai-hyakuyonjū Shidan) was an infantry division of the Imperial Japanese Army. Its call sign was the Tokyo protection division (護東兵団, Koto Heidan). It was formed 28 February 1945 in Fujisawa as a square division. It was a part of the 16 simultaneously created divisions batch numbering from 140th to 160th.

== Action ==
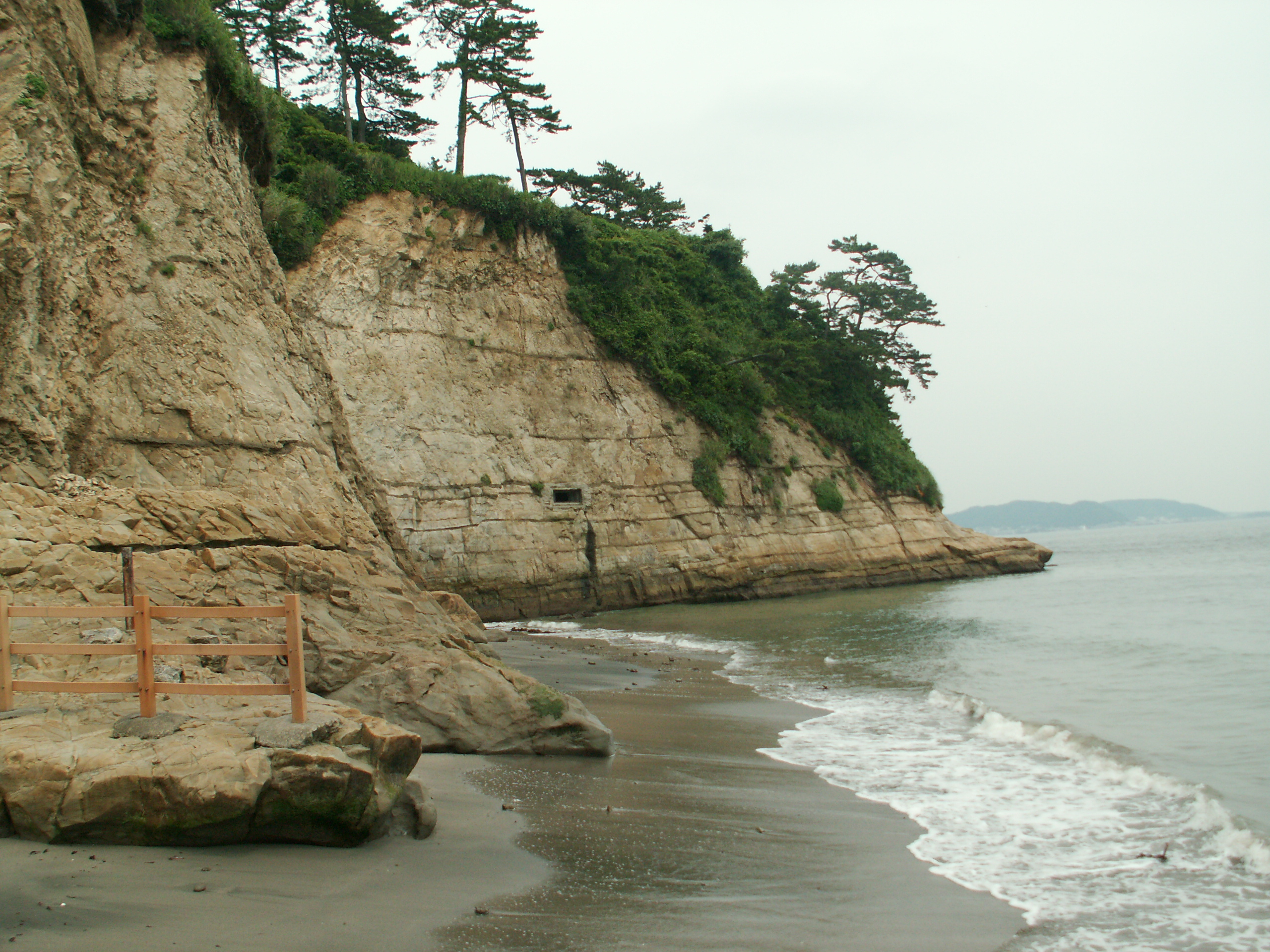
Firing port built by 140th division at Inamuragasaki

The 140th division was tasked with the fortification and the defence of the Shōnan coastal area. 401st infantry regiment was stationed at Mount Kamakura, 402nd - in Hachiōji, 403rd - in Fujisawa, 404th - in Goshomimura (now Fujisawa). 404th infantry regiment was severely understrength. The division stayed in the area until the surrender of Japan without seeing an actual combat.

== See also ==
- List of Japanese Infantry Divisions
Japanese infantry and armored units in Home Islands, 15 August 1945

== Notes and references ==
- This article incorporates material from Japanese Wikipedia page 第140師団 (日本軍), accessed 12 July 2016
- Madej, W. Victor, Japanese Armed Forces Order of Battle, 1937–1945 [2 vols], Allentown, PA: 1981.
