= 158th Brigade =

158th Brigade may refer to:

- 158th Mechanized Brigade
- 158th Infantry Brigade (United Kingdom)
- 158th Infantry Brigade (United States)
- 158th Maneuver Enhancement Brigade

== See also ==
- 158th Division (disambiguation)
- 158th Regiment (disambiguation)
