= 354th Division =

354th Division may refer to:

- 354th Division (Imperial Japanese Army)
- 354th Rifle Division, Soviet Union

== See also ==
- List of military divisions by number
