= Teiichi Yoshimoto =

Japanese military personnel (1887–1945)

- 吉本 貞一
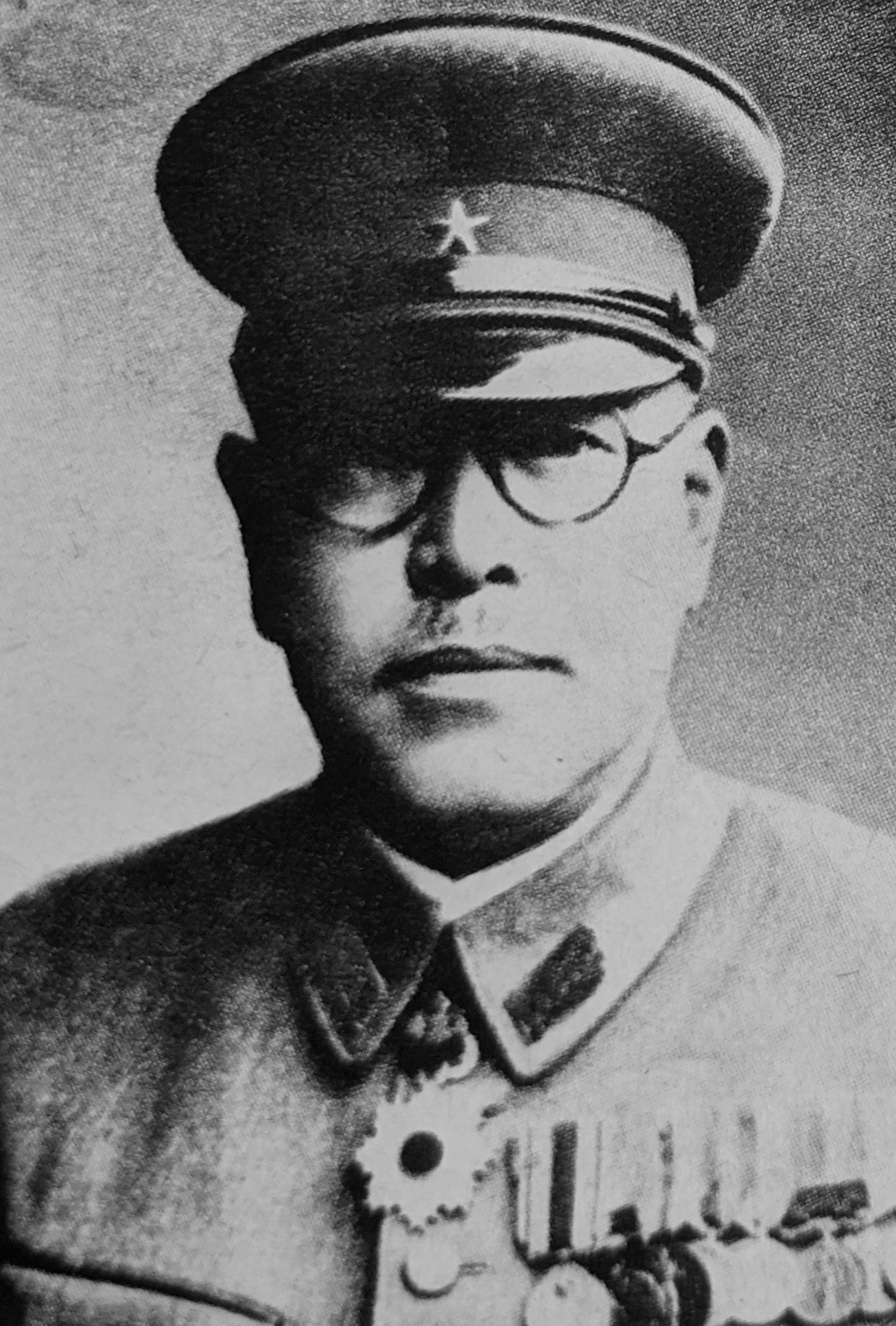
- Born: March 23, 1887; Tokushima, Japan
- Died: September 14, 1945 (aged 58); Tokyo, Japan
- Education: Imperial Japanese Army Academy; Army Staff College
- Military career
- Allegiance: Empire of Japan
- Branch: Imperial Japanese Army
- Service years: 1908–1945
- Rank: General
- Units: Imperial General Headquarters; IJA 11th Army; China Expeditionary Army; Kwantung Army
- Commands: IJA 68th Infantry Regiment; IJA 21st Infantry Brigade; IJA 2nd Division; IJA 1st Army; Japanese Eleventh Area Army
- Conflicts: Second Sino-Japanese War; World War II
- Awards: Order of the Golden Kite, 2nd class Order of the Rising Sun
- Other work: Military attaché to France

Teiichi Yoshimoto (吉本 貞一, Yoshimoto Teiichi; March 23, 1887 – September 14, 1945) was a general in the Imperial Japanese Army during World War II.

== Biography ==
=== Early career ===
Yoshimoto was the eldest son of an indigo merchant from Tokushima Prefecture. He was born in Tokyo, but his birth was registered in Tokushima. He graduated from the 20th class of the Imperial Japanese Army Academy in 1908 and 28th class of the Army Staff College in 1916 and was assigned to staff positions within the Imperial General Headquarters upon graduation.

In 1919 he was sent as a military attaché to France, returning in 1922. He remained in various administrative and bureaucratic positions within the Army Staff until 1933, when he was assigned command of the IJA 68th Infantry Regiment. He was promoted to major general in 1936 and assigned command of the IJA 21st Infantry Brigade. In 1937, he became Chief of Staff of the Tokyo Metropolitan Military Police, in charge of organizing defenses for eastern Japan.

=== World War II ===
In June 1938, Yoshimoto became chief-of-staff of the newly-formed IJA 11th Army. This force was part of the Japanese Central China Area Army and assigned the task of conquering and occupying the central provinces of China between the Yangtze River and the Yellow River during the Second Sino-Japanese War. The 11th Army played a major role in the Battle of Wuhan. From September 1939, it came under the newly formed China Expeditionary Army and Yoshimoto became chief-of-staff of the China Expeditionary Army from January 1939. He was promoted to lieutenant general that March and assigned command of the IJA 2nd Division that November.

On April 29, 1940, Yoshimoto was awarded the Order of the Golden Kite, 2nd class and the Grand Cordon of the Order of the Rising Sun. In April 1941, he became chief of staff of the Kwantung Army and from April 1942 was assigned command of the IJA 1st Army. During this time, the 1st Army was largely a garrison force in Manchukou. He was Imperial General Headquarters. In February 1945, he was assigned to the newly-created Japanese Eleventh Area Army. This force was part of the last desperate defense effort by the Empire of Japan to deter possible landings of Allied forces in Honshū during Operation Downfall and was responsible for the Tōhoku region of Japan from its headquarters in Sendai, Miyagi. On May 7, 1945 he was promoted to general, and in June received the honorific title of Junior Third Court Rank. On September 14, 1945, shortly after the surrender of Japan, he committed suicide at The Imperial Japanese Army headquarters in Ichigaya, Tokyo.

== Career ==
- December 1908: Second Lieutenant
- December 1911: First Lieutenant
- October 1918: Captain
- August 1923: Major
- March 1928: Lieutenant colonel
- August 1, 1931: Colonel
- March 7, 1936: Major general
- March 9, 1939: Lieutenant general
- May 7, 1945: General

Military offices
Preceded by Office created	Chief of Staff of the Imperial Japanese 11th Army; 1938–1939	Succeeded by Takazo Numata
Preceded by Yoshio Iwamatsu	Commander of the Imperial Japanese 1st Army; 1942–1944	Succeeded by Raishiro Sumida
Preceded by Office created	Commander of the Imperial Japanese 11th Area Army; 1945	Succeeded by Keisuke Fujie

== General references ==
- Fukagawa, Hideki (1981). (陸海軍将官人事総覧 (陸軍篇)) Army and Navy General Personnel Directory (Army). Tokyo: Fuyo Shobo. ISBN 4829500026.
- Dupuy, Trevor N. (1992). Encyclopedia of Military Biography. I B Tauris & Co Ltd. ISBN 1-85043-569-3.
- Hata, Ikuhiko (2005). (日本陸海軍総合事典) Japanese Army and Navy General Encyclopedia. Tokyo: St. Martin's Press. ISBN 4130301357.
