= 151st Division (Imperial Japanese Army) =

- 第151師団
- Active: 1945–1945
- Country: Empire of Japan
- Branch: Imperial Japanese Army
- Type: Infantry
- Size: 10000
- Garrison/HQ: Mito
- Nickname: Utsunomiya Protection Division
- Engagements: none

The 151st Division (第151師団, Dai-hyakugojūichi Shidan) was an infantry division of the Imperial Japanese Army. Its call sign was the Utsunomiya Protection Division (護宇兵団, Gou Heidan). It was formed on 28 February 1945 in Utsunomiya as a square division. It was a part of the 16 simultaneously created divisions batch numbering from 140th to 160th.

== World War II ==
The 151st Division was assigned to the 51st Army in April 1945 and performed coastal defense duties in Mito, Ibaraki, until the surrender of Japan on 15 August 1945 without seeing an actual combat. The 433rd Infantry Regiment garrisoned Hitachi, Ibaraki, the 434th and 436th Hitachinaka, Ibaraki, and the 435th Kasama, Ibaraki.

== See also ==
- List of Japanese Infantry Divisions
Japanese infantry and armored units in Home Islands, 15 August 1945

== Notes and references ==
- This article incorporates material from Japanese Wikipedia page 第151師団 (日本軍), accessed 13 July 2016
- Madej, W. Victor, Japanese Armed Forces Order of Battle, 1937–1945 [2 vols], Allentown, PA: 1981.
