= 158th Division (Imperial Japanese Army) =

- 第158師団
- Active: 1945–1945
- Country: Empire of Japan
- Allegiance: 11th area army
- Branch: Imperial Japanese Army
- Type: Infantry
- Size: 10000
- Garrison/HQ: Changchun
- Nickname: Immortal division
- Engagements: none

The 158th Division (第158師団, Dai-hyakugojūhachi Shidan) was an infantry division of the Imperial Japanese Army. Its call sign was the Immortal Division (不滅兵団, Fumetsu Heidan). It was formed 10 August 1945 in Changchun as a triangular division.

== Action ==
The 158th division was organised from the cadets of the training units during the Soviet invasion of Manchuria. The war ended with the surrender of Japan 15 August 1945 before the 158th division can complete the organization.

== See also ==
- List of Japanese Infantry Divisions

== Notes and references ==
- This article incorporates material from Japanese Wikipedia page 第158師団 (日本軍), accessed 14 July 2016
- Madej, W. Victor, Japanese Armed Forces Order of Battle, 1937–1945 [2 vols], Allentown, PA: 1981.
