= List of Japanese infantry divisions =

This is a list of Japanese infantry divisions of the Imperial Japanese Army. During World War II, the IJA organized three Guards Divisions and over 220 infantry divisions of various types (A: Reinforced, B: Standard, C: Counter-insurgency). On 7 December the IJA had two divisions serving in Japan/Korea and 50 serving abroad, most in China. During the war another 117 were raised for foreign service and 56 were raised for national defense. These totaled 223 including the Imperial Guard. Additionally one parachute and four armored divisions were formed. Of this total no more than 35, that is one fifth of the IJA infantry division total, fought in the Pacific theatre.

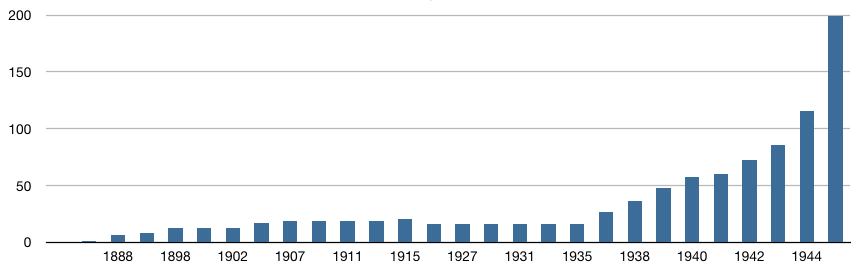

Total amount of IJA divisions, including infantry, armor, parachute, anti-air and air-service, from 1888 to 1945

== Guard Divisions ==
The Konoe Imperial Guard of Japan was originally one Imperial Guards Division until the beginning of the Second Sino-Japanese War. It was expanded during World War II into three Guards Divisions:

- Konoe Imperial Guards Division
- 1st Guards Division
- 2nd Guards Division
- 3rd Guards Division
Japanese infantry and armored units in Home Islands, 15 August 1945

== Infantry Divisions ==
The first 18 divisions were originally formed as square divisions, and after 1938, and the remainder were formed either as triangular divisions or as binary security divisions. 16 coastal defense divisions with numbers from 140th to 160th (except for 148th and 149th divisions) were also formed as square divisions.

- 1st Division
- 2nd Division
- 3rd Division
- 4th Division
- 5th Division
- 6th Division
- 7th Division
- 8th Division
- 9th Division
- 10th Division
- 11th Division
- 12th Division
- 13th Division
- 14th Division
- 15th Division
- 16th Division
- 17th Division
- 18th Division
- 19th Division
- 20th Division
- 21st Division
- 22nd Division
- 23rd Division
- 24th Division
- 25th Division
- 26th Division
- 27th Division
- 28th Division
- 29th Division
- 30th Division
- 31st Division
- 32nd Division
- 33rd Division
- 34th Division
- 35th Division
- 36th Division
- 37th Division
- 38th Division
- 39th Division
- 40th Division
- 41st Division
- 42nd Division
- 43rd Division
- 44th Division
- 46th Division
- 47th Division
- 48th Division
- 49th Division
- 50th Division
- 51st Division
- 52nd Division
- 53rd Division
- 54th Division
- 55th Division
- 56th Division
- 57th Division
- 58th Division
- 59th Division
- 60th Division
- 61st Division
- 62nd Division
- 63rd Division
- 64th Division
- 65th Division
- 66th Division
- 68th Division
- 69th Division
- 70th Division
- 71st Division
- 72nd Division
- 73rd Division
- 77th Division
- 79th Division
- 81st Division
- 84th Division
- 86th Division
- 88th Division
- 89th Division
- 91st Division
- 93rd Division
- 94th Division
- 96th Division
- 100th Division
- 101st Division
- 102nd Division
- 103rd Division
- 104th Division
- 105th Division
- 106th Division
- 107th Division
- 108th Division
- 109th Division
- 110th Division
- 111th Division
- 112th Division
- 114th Division
- 115th Division
- 116th Division
- 117th Division
- 118th Division
- 119th Division
- 120th Division
- 121st Division
- 122nd Division
- 123rd Division
- 124th Division
- 125th Division
- 126th Division
- 127th Division
- 128th Division
- 129th Division
- 130th Division
- 131st Division
- 132nd Division
- 133rd Division
- 134th Division
- 135th Division
- 136th Division
- 137th Division
- 138th Division
- 139th Division
- 140th Division
- 142nd Division
- 143rd Division
- 144th Division
- 145th Division
- 146th Division
- 147th Division
- 148th Division
- 149th Division
- 150th Division
- 151st Division
- 152nd Division
- 153rd Division
- 154th Division
- 155th Division
- 156th Division
- 157th Division
- 158th Division
- 160th Division
- 161st Division
- 201st Division
- 202nd Division
- 205th Division
- 206th Division
- 209th Division
- 212th Division
- 214th Division
- 216th Division
- 221st Division
- 222nd Division
- 224th Division
- 225th Division
- 229th Division
- 230th Division
- 231st Division
- 234th Division
- 303rd Division
- 308th Division
- 312th Division
- 316th Division
- 320th Division
- 321st Division
- 322nd Division
- 344th Division
- 351st Division
- 354th Division
- 355th Division

== See also ==
- List of Japanese armored divisions
- List of air divisions of the Imperial Japanese Army

== Sources ==
- Madej, W. Victor, Japanese Armed Forces Order of Battle, 1937-1945 [2 vols] Allentown, PA: 1981
- United States War Department (1991) [1944]. Handbook on Japanese Military Forces. Baton Rouge and London: Louisiana State University Press. ISBN 0-8071-2013-8.
- The Japanese Mutumi troop encyclopedia 陸 軍 編
