= 158th =

158th is the ordinal form of the number 158. 158th or One hundred and fifty-eighth may also refer to:

- A fraction, 1/158, equal to one of 158 equal parts

== Geography ==
- 158th meridian east, a line of longitude
- 158th meridian west, a line of longitude

== Military ==
- 158th Brigade (disambiguation)
- 158th Division (disambiguation)
- 158th Regiment (disambiguation)

== See also ==
- June 7, 158th day of the year in a standard year
