= 24th Independent Mixed Brigade =

The Imperial Japanese Army 24th Independent Mixed Brigade was an Independent Mixed Brigade formed in 1942. It was assigned to the Japanese Eighth Area Army, but stayed in reserve and did not participated in the New Guinea Campaign. The brigade was transferred to Japanese Burma Area Army in 1944. The unit was staying in Western Burma and engaged in the Siege of Myitkyina during the Burma Campaign 1944–45.
