= 57th Division (Imperial Japanese Army) =

- Active: 1940 - 1945
- Country: Empire of Japan
- Branch: Imperial Japanese Army
- Type: Infantry
- Garrison/HQ: Hirosaki
- Nickname(s): Inner Division
- Engagements: none

Commanders
- Notable commanders: Mikio Uemura

The 57th Division (第57師団, Dai-gojūnana Shidan) was an infantry division of the Imperial Japanese Army. Its call sign was the Inner Division (奥兵団, Oku Heidan). It was formed on 10 July 1940 in Hirosaki, Aomori, simultaneously with the 51st, 52nd, 54th, 55th, and 56th divisions, as a reserve and provisional unit. Its call-sign “Oku” was taken from the ancient name of the Tohoku region of northern Honshū, "Oshu". The formation nucleus was the headquarters of the 8th Division. Its manpower came from the Aomori, Iwate, Yamagata and Akita prefectures. The 57th division was initially assigned to the direct command of Emperor Hirohito but was transferred to the Northern District Army as soon as it was formed on 2 December 1940.

== History ==
To participate in the Special exercise of the Kwantung Army (actually a mobilization for a possible large-scale conflict with the Soviet Union) together with the 51st division, the 57th Division was assigned to the Kwantung Army`s 3rd army on 1 August 1941. The preparations for war with the Soviet Union were officially cancelled on 9 August 1941, and the 57th division was reassigned to the 4th army.

From 1941 to 1945 the division was used to defend Manchukuo in the coastal part of Heilongjiang. In March 1945, the 57th division was replaced in Heilongjiang with the recently formed 125th division and sent to Fukuoka to eventually join the 36th army protecting the Tokyo region. The division nearly completed sea leg of transfer (to Fukuoka) by 18 April 1945. Due to bad developments in the Battle of Okinawa, on 10 May 1945 the further movement of the 57th division was cancelled and it was re-subordinated to the 16th Area Army to counter the anticipated Operation Downfall by the US forces. The division had met the day of surrender of Japan on 15 August 1945 at Fukuoka without seeing any combat.

Japanese infantry and armored units in Home Islands, 15 August 1945

== See also ==
- List of Japanese Infantry Divisions

== Notes ==
- This article incorporates material from Japanese Wikipedia page 第57師団 (日本軍), accessed 9 June 2016

== Reference and further reading ==
- Madej, W. Victor. Japanese Armed Forces Order of Battle, 1937-1945 [2 vols]

Allentown, PA: 1981
