= 158th Division =

In military terms, 158th Division or 158th Infantry Division may refer to:

- 158th Division (People's Republic of China), 1948–1959
- 158th Infantry Division (Wehrmacht), Germany
- 158th Infantry Division "Zara", Italy, World War II
- 158th Division (Imperial Japanese Army), 1945
- 158th Rifle Division, Soviet Union

== See also ==
- List of military divisions by number
- 158th Brigade (disambiguation)
- 158th Regiment (disambiguation)
- 158th (disambiguation)
