= 54th Division (Imperial Japanese Army) =

- Active: 1940–1945
- Country: Japan
- Branch: Imperial Japanese Army
- Type: Infantry
- Garrison/HQ: Himeji
- Nickname: Soldier division
- Engagements: Battle of Meiktila and Mandalay; Battle of Hill 170; Battle of the Sittang Bend

The 54th Division (第54師団, Dai-gojūyon Shidan) was an infantry division of the Imperial Japanese Army. Its call sign was the Soldier Division (兵兵団, Hei Heidan). It was formed on 10 July 1940 in Himeji, simultaneously with the 51st, 52nd, 55th, 56th, and 57th divisions. The formation nucleus was the headquarters of the 10th division. The men of the 54th division were recruited from Hyōgo, Okayama and Tottori prefectures. The 54th division was initially assigned to the Central District Army.

In February 1943, the division was assigned to the 16th army. The bulk of the division had sailed from Moji onboard the ship "Miike Maru", together with the 30th Independent Mixed Brigade. On 23 April 1943 it landed in Shanghai and departed again for Saigon on 19 July 1943, arriving on 30 July 1943 The 154th infantry regiment and signals company had followed and arrive on 12 May 1943 from the Ujina terminal of Hiroshima onboard the ships "Takoma Maru" and "Nagato Maru", arriving directly in Singapore on 9 June 1943. The 54th division was re-subordinated to the 28th army in January 1944 and sent to Burma.

The 54th Division remained in the Arakan region of Burma during the Battle of the Admin Box in February 1944. From December 1944, it suffered heavy losses in Battle of Meiktila and Mandalay, including the Battle of Hill 170 in January 1945 and was generally in full retreat to Irrawaddy River in April 1945. During the Battle of the Sittang Bend in July-August 1945, it suffered over 50% losses from enemy shellfire, air raids, cholera and dysentery. At the surrender of Japan on 15 August 1945 the 54th division was situated on the eastern coasts of the Sittaung River.

== Notes ==
- This article incorporates material from Japanese Wikipedia page 第54師団 (日本軍), accessed 3 June 2016

== See also ==
- List of Japanese Infantry Divisions

== Reference and further reading ==
- Madej, Victor (1981). Japanese Armed Forces Order of Battle, 1937–1945. Allentown, PA: Game Publishing Company. OCLC 8930220.
