= 52nd Division (Imperial Japanese Army) =

- Active: 1940–1945
- Country: Japan
- Branch: Imperial Japanese Army
- Type: Infantry
- Nickname: Oak division
- Engagements: Operation Hailstone

The 52nd Division (第52師団, Dai-gojūni Shidan) was an infantry division of the Imperial Japanese Army. Its call sign was the Oak Division (柏兵団, Kashiwa Heidan). It was formed on 10 July 1940 at Kanazawa, simultaneously with the 51st, 54th, 55th, 56th, and 57th divisions. The formation nucleus was the headquarters of the 9th division. The men of the 52nd Division were recruited from Ishikawa, Toyama and Nagano prefectures.

The 52nd Division was a provisional unit, intended to form sub-units usable by other military units, rather than being used itself. In particular, the 16th Mountain Artillery Regiment and 52nd Cavalry Regiment were detached in October 1943. The division was renamed to the Kanazawa Mobilization District in 1941 (not to be mistaken with the Kanazawa Mobilization District Command formed in 1945).

In January 1944, the 52nd Division was reformed as marine division, absorbing artillery and engineer units into infantry regiments, and sent to Chuuk Lagoon, to be incorporated into the 31st Army formed on 18 February 1944. As the Allies had bypassed the Japanese forces at Chuuk Lagoon (Truk) and the other eastern Caroline Islands, the 52nd Division saw little action or hardship besides the U.S. Navy's attacks during Operation Hailstone.

== Notes ==
- This article incorporates material from Japanese Wikipedia page 第52師団 (日本軍), accessed 2 June 2016

== See also ==
- List of Japanese Infantry Divisions

== Reference and further reading ==
- Madej, Victor (1981). Japanese Armed Forces Order of Battle, 1937–1945. Allentown, PA: Game Publishing Company. OCLC 8930220.
