= 51st Division (Imperial Japanese Army) =

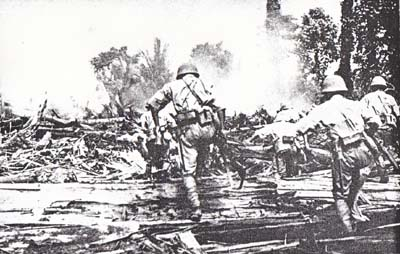
- Soldiers of the 51st Division attacking Allied defenses in Papua New Guinea, 1943
- Active: 1940–1945
- Country: Japan
- Branch: Imperial Japanese Army
- Type: Infantry
- Size: 16,000
- Garrison/HQ: Utsunomiya
- Nickname: Base division
- Engagements: Second Sino-Japanese War; Battle of Hong Kong; Battle of the Bismarck Sea; New Guinea campaign

Commanders
- Notable commanders: Yi Un; Hidemitsu Nakano

The 51st Division (第51師団, Dai-gojūichi Shidan) was an infantry division of the Imperial Japanese Army. Its call sign was the Base Division (基兵団, Moto Heidan). It was formed on 10 July 1940 at Utsunomiya, Tochigi, simultaneously with 52nd, 54th, 55th, 56th, and 57th divisions. The 51st Division was initially assigned to the Eastern District Army and placed under command of Lieutenant General Kenichiro Ueno.

== History ==
The division was formed in 1940 at Kanazawa, in Japan. Its main elements included the 66th, 102nd and 115th Infantry Regiments, the 14th Field Artillery Regiment, the 51st Reconnaissance Regiment, the 51st Engineer Regiment and the 51st Transport Regiment. The 51st Division was initially assigned to the Eastern District Army and placed under command of Lieutenant General Kenichiro Ueno.

To participate in the Special exercise of the Kwantung Army (actually a mobilization for the possible large-scale conflict with the Soviet Union) on 2 July 1941 Prince Yi Un took over as commander of the division, leading them to China when they were transferred to the Kwantung Army in August 1941. The preparations for the war with the Soviet Union were officially cancelled 9 August 1941, though. In September 1941, the 51st Division was transferred to Guangdong under command of 23rd army. The Araki detachment of the 51st division, consisting of the 66th Infantry Regiment was used that time for the rearguard duties in Battle of Hong Kong. In November 1941, Yi Un handed over command to Lieutenant General Hidemitsu Nakano, who would remain in command of the division until after the end of the war.

The following year, in November 1942, the 51st Division was allocated to the 18th army, and was shipped to Rabaul. By 28 February 1943, the parts of the 51st Division had left Rabaul for Lae in New Guinea. The Allied aircraft intercepted the convoy on 2 March 1943, resulting in the Battle of the Bismarck Sea, resulting in only 1,200 troops of 6,900 reaching Lae. A further 800 troops from the 115th Infantry Regiment were rescued and ferried by the destroyers Yukikaze and Asagumo to Finschhafen and travelled to Lae overland. Meanwhile, the rest of the 51st Division reached Lae in May 1943 having moved there in several landing craft following the New Guinea coast from Madang or from the Dampier Strait. The division eventually concentrated in Salamaua area, and subsequently took part in the Salamaua–Lae campaign.

On 4 September 1943, the Allies landed at Lae unopposed, and the 51st Division was ordered to reinforce the Shoge detachment of the 41st Division. On 8 September 1943, the Hidemitsu Nakano ordered a general retreat from Salamaua to Lae due to the threat of imminent encirclement by Allied forces advancing inland after Landing at Nadzab.

The retreat to Lae started on 11 September 1943 and was complete by 14 September 1943. By this time, an order was received to evacuate to the north coast of Huon Peninsula, therefore the 51st Division tried to cross the Saruwaged Range, which proved to be nearly impassable. The division lost all of their heavy equipment and most of their rifles due exhaustion and hunger, and the passage took a whole month instead of expected ten days. By that time, the evacuation port of Finschhafen had been rendered unusable after the Allied Landing at Scarlet Beach on 22 September 1943. In addition to combat losses, about 800 Japanese troops were also lost to the accidents. The Allied forces entered Lae on 16 September 1943, but except for a single contact with the Japanese rearguard on 13 September 1943, they were unable to mount a pursuit across the inhospitable terrain in appalling weather conditions. Due to a lack of weapons and ammunition, the survivors of the 51st Division were largely excluded from the Huon Peninsula campaign, with only one left-behind company from the 102nd Infantry Regiment participating in the Battle of Finschhafen. During 1944–1945 the main challenge faced by the 51st Division was starvation. Only 2,754 men survived until surrender of Japan on 15 August 1945.

== See also ==
- List of Japanese infantry divisions

== Footnotes ==
- This article incorporates material from Japanese Wikipedia page 第51師団 (日本軍), accessed 2 June 2016
