= 105th Division (Imperial Japanese Army) =

- 第105師団
- Active: 1944 - 1945
- Country: Empire of Japan
- Allegiance: 14th area army
- Branch: Imperial Japanese Army
- Type: Infantry
- Size: 16100
- Garrison/HQ: Luzon
- Nickname: Diligent division
- Engagements: Battle of Luzon

The 105th Division (第105師団, Dai-hyakugo Shidan) was an infantry division of the Imperial Japanese Army. Its call sign was the Diligent Division (勤兵団, Kin Heidan). It was formed 15 June 1944 in southern Luzon as a C(hey)-class security division. The nucleus for the formation was the 33rd Independent Mixed Brigade and Kawashima detachment. The division was initially assigned to the 14th area army

== Action ==
Initially the 105th division was garrisoning from Manila to Bicol Region. Prior to the Battle of Luzon, various detachments were sent north, particularly to Lamon Bay. Largest of these units is known as "Noguchi detachment". Although some of the detachments have fought in Cagayan during the Battle of Luzon since January 1945 and were forced to retreat to the Kiangan, Ifugao, the bulk of the 105th division has survived until surrender of Japan 15 August 1945.

== See also ==
- List of Japanese Infantry Divisions
- Independent Mixed Brigades (Imperial Japanese Army)

== Notes and references ==
- This article incorporates material from Japanese Wikipedia page 第105師団 (日本軍), accessed 27 June 2016
- Madej, W. Victor, Japanese Armed Forces Order of Battle, 1937-1945 [2 vols], Allentown, PA: 1981.
