= 66th Division (Imperial Japanese Army) =

- Active: 1944 - 1945
- Country: Empire of Japan
- Branch: Imperial Japanese Army
- Type: Infantry
- Role: garrison
- Garrison/HQ: Taipei
- Nickname: Daring Division
- Engagements: none

The 66th Division (第66師団, Dai-rokujūroku Shidan) was an infantry division of the Imperial Japanese Army. Its call sign was the Daring Division (敢兵団, Kan Heidan). It was formed on 12 July 1944 in Taipei city on Taiwan island. The nucleus for the formation was the 46th Independent mixed brigade casualties and local recruits. Also, the 249th infantry regiment was formed primarily from Takasago men.

== Action ==
The 66th division was permanently assigned to the 10th area army (and to the 40th army in time it was based on Taiwan in early 1945). It was assigned to the coastal defence duties around Keelung, but did not see any combat until the surrender of Japan 15 August 1945.

The 102nd Independent Mixed Brigade was detached from the 66th division to guard an area on south of Hualien City in February 1945.

== See also ==
- List of Japanese Infantry Divisions
- Independent Mixed Brigades (Imperial Japanese Army)

== Notes and references ==
- Madej, W. Victor. Japanese Armed Forces Order of Battle, 1937-1945 [2 vols]

Allentown, PA: 1981

- This article incorporates material from Japanese Wikipedia page 第66師団 (日本軍), accessed 18 June 2016
