= 55th Division (Imperial Japanese Army) =

Japanese infantry division

- Active: 1940–1945
- Country: Empire of Japan
- Branch: Imperial Japanese Army
- Type: Infantry
- Size: Division
- Garrison/HQ: Himeji
- Nickname: Virile Division
- Engagements: World War II; Burma Campaign; Battle of Bilin River; Battle of Toungoo; Arakan Campaign 1942–43; Battle of the Admin Box

Commanders
- Notable commanders: Torazo Ishimoto; Hiroshi Takeuchi; Takeshi Koga; Tadashi Hanaya; Ryozo Sakuma

The 55th Division (第55師団, Dai-gojūgo Shidan) was an infantry division of the Imperial Japanese Army during World War II. Its call sign was the Virile Division (壮兵団, Sou Heidan). It was formed on 10 July 1940 in Zentsūji, simultaneously with the 51st, 52nd, 54th, 56th, and 57th divisions. The formation nucleus was the headquarters of the 11th Division. Its manpower came primarily from the four prefectures of Shikoku Island. The 55th Division was initially assigned to the Central District Army.

In 1941, the division was assigned to the 15th Army and participated in the Japanese conquest of Burma. The division had the 143rd Regiment detached to separately capture Dawei (Tavoy) and Myeik (Mergui), while the main troop had captured Mawlamyine (Moulmein) on 31 January 1942. In March 1942 the division fought for 14 days around the city of Taungoo against the weakened Chinese 200th Division. The fight ended when the Chinese broke through and disengaged. On 18 April 1942, the 55th Division had encircled the Chinese 55th Division, eventually wiping it out. During the Burma Campaign, the 144th Infantry Regiment was detached from the division and sent to New Guinea. The rest of the 55th was used to counter an ill-planned British attack at Donbaik (Sittwe (Akyab)) from 18 March 1943. By 3 April 1943 the division had started to advance past the Mayu range, eventually surrounding and defeating a number of British units; encountering stiffer resistance from May 1943 onwards. Mid November 1943 the 55th was still in the Arakan area. Finally, the division fought a failed offensive which become the Battle of the Admin Box in February 1944. On 19 February 1944, the commander of the 112th Infantry Regiment, at that time down from 3000 to 400 men, had broken radio communication with the division headquarters and withdrew his men. In the aftermath of the disastrous Battle of Imphal, the division was assigned to the 28th Army in Burma and, after retreating to the Irrawaddy River, was subordinated to 38th Army. On 15 August 1945, when the Surrender of Japan was declared, the 55th Division was in Phnom Penh.

== See also ==
- List of Japanese Infantry Divisions

== Notes ==
- This article incorporates material from Japanese Wikipedia page 第55師団 (日本軍), accessed 6 June 2016

== Reference and further reading ==
- Madej, Victor (1981). Japanese Armed Forces Order of Battle, 1937–1945. Allentown, PA: Game Publishing Company. OCLC 8930220.
- Ian Grant and Kazuo Tamayama, Burma 1942, Zampi Press, Chichester, 1999. ISBN 0-9521083-1-3
- Charles Happell "The Bone Man of Kokoda: The extraordinary story of Kokichi Nishimura and the Kokoda Track" Macmillan Publishers, Crows Nest, 2008. ISBN 978-1-4050-3836-2
