= 10th Division (Imperial Japanese Army) =

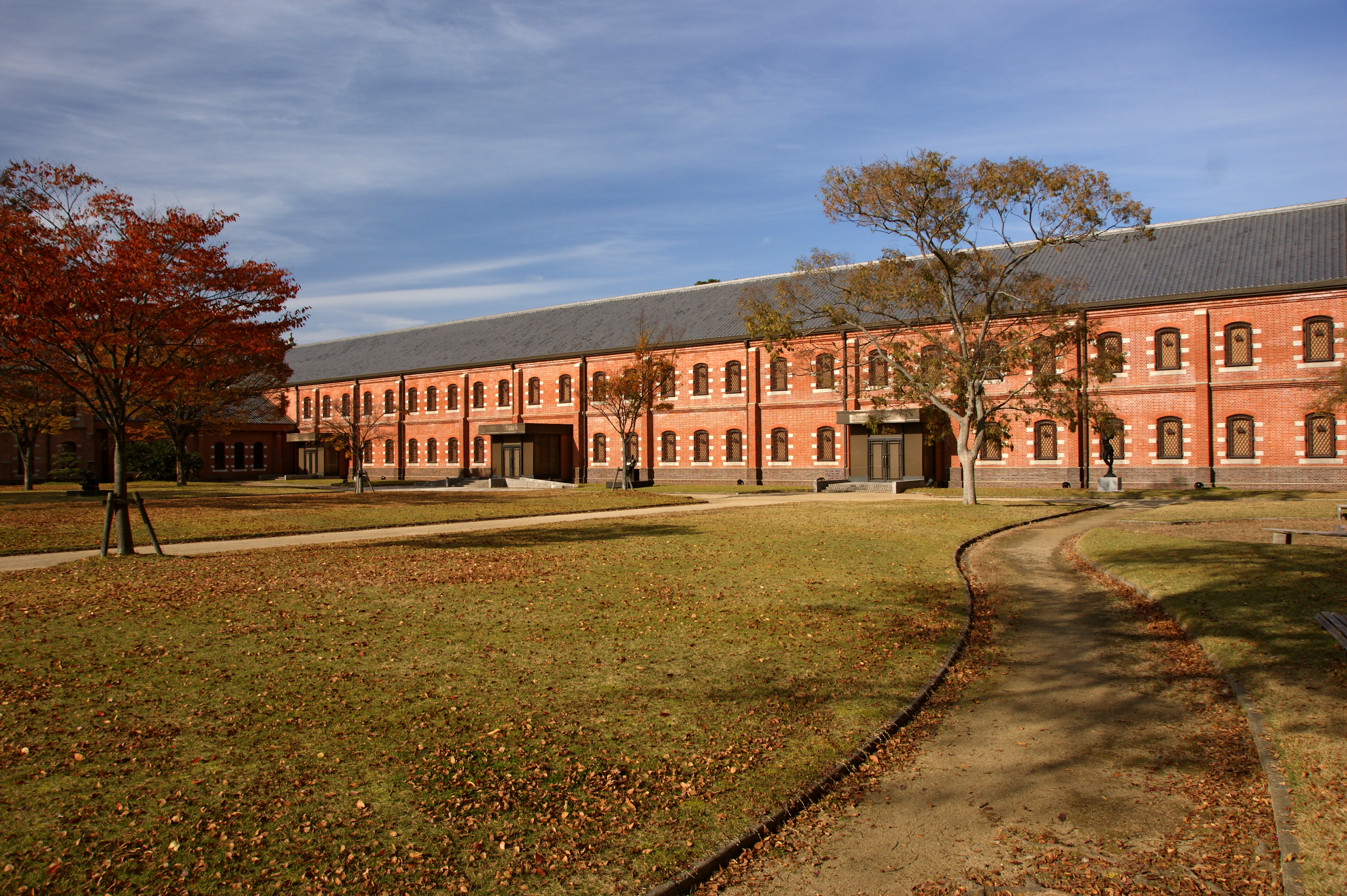
- former 10th Division warehouses, now the Himeji City Museum of Art
- Active: 1 October 1898 – 1945
- Country: Empire of Japan
- Branch: Imperial Japanese Army
- Type: Infantry
- Size: 15–20,000 men
- Garrison/HQ: Himeji, Japan
- Nickname(s): Iron Division
- Engagements: Russo-Japanese War; Second Sino-Japanese War; World War II

Commanders
- Notable commanders: Kawamura Kageaki; Rensuke Isogai; Shigeru Honjo; Isamu Cho

The 10th Division (第10師団, Dai-Jū Shidan) was an infantry division in the Imperial Japanese Army. Its tsūshōgō code name was the Iron Division (鉄兵団, Tetsu-heidan). The 10th Division was one of six new infantry divisions raised by the Imperial Japanese Army in the aftermath of the First Sino-Japanese War, 1 October 1898. Its troops were recruited primarily from communities in the three prefectures of Hyōgo, Okayama and Tottori, plus a portion of Shimane. It was originally headquartered in the city of Himeji, and its first commander was Lieutenant General Prince Fushimi Sadanaru.

== Action ==
=== Russo-Japanese War ===
During the Russo-Japanese War, under the command of Lieutenant General Kawamura Kageaki, this division was assigned to the 4th Army, and saw combat (and casualties) at the Battle of the Yalu River (April 1904), Battle of Hsimucheng (July 1904), Battle of Liaoyang (August 1904), Battle of Shaho (October 1904) as part of the 4th army. From 15 January 1905, it came under the command of Lieutenant General Andō Teibi and participated at the Battle of Sandepu and Battle of Mukden.

=== Second Sino-Japanese War to Pacific War ===
The 10th Division was deployed back to the Asian continent during the Mukden Incident of September 1931 and remained stationed in Manchuria afterwards, participating in the Jinzhou Operation of 1932, and returned to Japan in March 1934.

From July 1937, with the start of the Second Sino-Japanese War, the 10th Division returned to China under the command of Lieutenant General Rensuke Isogai. It was in combat during the Beiping–Hankou Railway Operation, Tianjin–Pukou Railway Operation and Battle of Xuzhou, where it suffered a serious reverse in the Battle of Taierzhuang. It was also in the northern pincer of the Japanese offensive in the Battle of Wuhan. It was withdrawn back to Japan in October 1939 and reorganized at that time into a triangular division, with its IJA 40th Infantry Regiment (Tottori) transferred to the newly formed IJA 25th Division. In August 1940, the reorganized division was sent to Jiamusi, northern Manchukuo under the command of Lieutenant General Tōichi Sasaki, and placed under the control of the Kwantung Army. For the next few years, it served as a border garrison force and supporting anti-partisan police actions. However, in 1944, as the situation in the Pacific War grew increasing desperate for Japan, the 10th Division was transferred to the operations against the United States. Initially earmarked for a transfer to Taiwan, the 10th Division was sent instead to Luzon in the Philippines, coming under the command of the Japanese Fourteenth Area Army. It was mostly annihilated in the subsequent Battle of Luzon, with 39th infantry regiment thought with particular distinction, and continued a guerrilla war until the Surrender of Japan 15 August 1945, despite heavy casualties due tropical diseases and malnutrition.

== See also ==
- List of Japanese Infantry divisions
