= Keisuke Fujie =

Imperial Japanese Army general (1885–1969)

- 藤江 恵輔
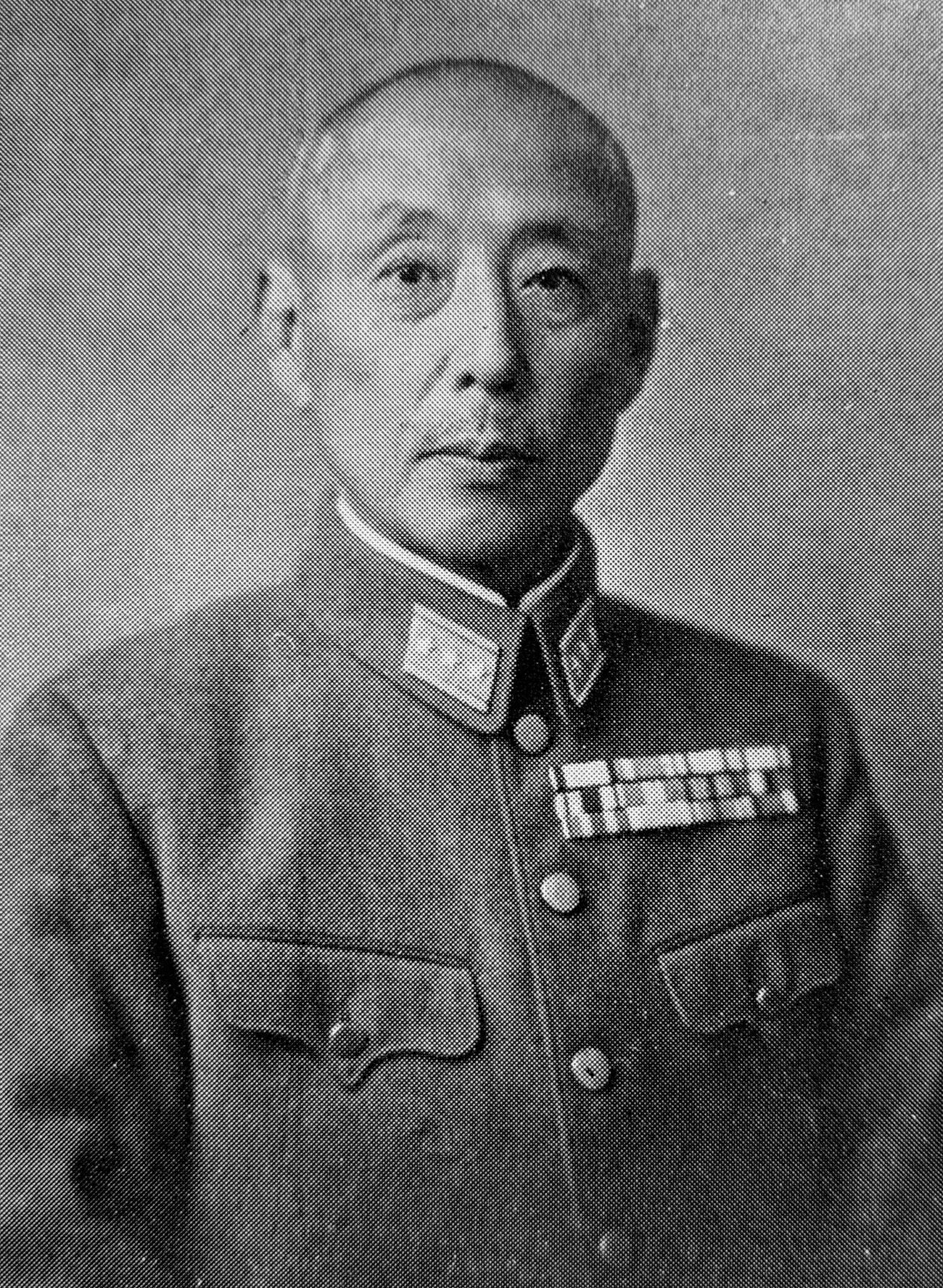
- Born: 8 November 1885; Hyōgo, Japan
- Died: 27 February 1969 (aged 83)
- Education: Imperial Japanese Army Academy; Army Staff College
- Family: Kantarō Suzuki (father-in-law)
- Military career
- Allegiance: Empire of Japan
- Branch: Imperial Japanese Army
- Service years: 1905–1945
- Rank: General
- Units: Imperial Japanese Army General Staff; Kwantung Army
- Commands: 5th Field Artillery Regiment, Kempetai, 16th Division, Army Staff College, Eastern District Army, 12th Area Army, 11th Area Army
- Conflicts: Second Sino-Japanese War; World War II
- Other work: Military attaché, instructor, delegate

Keisuke Fujie (藤江 恵輔, Fujie Keisuke; 8 November 1885 – 27 February 1969) was a general in the Imperial Japanese Army during World War II. His wife was the daughter of Prime Minister Kantarō Suzuki.

== Biography ==
Fujie was born in Hyōgo Prefecture and graduated from the 18th class of the Imperial Japanese Army Academy in 1905, with a specialty in artillery. He went on to graduate from the 26th class of the Army Staff College in 1914.

After serving on the Imperial Japanese Army General Staff, Fujie was dispatched as a military attaché to Europe, initially to the Japanese embassy at Paris, France, and later to Bucharest, Romania and Sophia, Bulgaria. After his return to Japan, he served as instructor at the Army Staff College and was appointed commander of the IJA 5th Field Artillery Regiment.

Fujie was later on the staff of the IJA 16th Division, and accompanied the Japanese delegation to the Geneva Disarmament Conference. He was promoted to major general in August 1934, was head of the Kempetai in 1936–1937 under the Kwantung Army, and promoted to lieutenant general in November 1937.

During the Second Sino-Japanese War, Fujie was commander of the IJA 16th Division. Recalled to Japan, he then served as Commandant of the Army Staff College and was appointed commander of the Eastern District Army in February 1943. Subsequently commander of the IJA 12th Area Army, he retired in March 1945, but was recalled in June the same year to command the IJA 11th Area Army for the final defense of the Tohoku region of Japan against the projected American invasion.
