= 56th Division (Imperial Japanese Army) =

- Active: 1940–1945
- Country: Empire of Japan
- Branch: Imperial Japanese Army
- Type: Infantry
- Garrison/HQ: Kurume
- Nickname: Dragon Division
- Engagements: Battle of Toungoo; Siege of Myitkyina; Battle of Mount Song

Commanders
- Notable commanders: Masao Watanabe; Yuzo Matsuyama

The 56th Division (第56師団, Dai-gojūroku Shidan) was an infantry division of the Imperial Japanese Army. Its call sign was the Dragon Division (龍兵団, Tatsu Heidan). It was formed on 10 July 1940 in Kurume, simultaneously with the 51st, 52nd, 54th, 55th, and 57th Divisions. The formation nucleus was the headquarters of the 12th Division. Its manpower came primarily from Fukuoka, Saga and Nagasaki prefectures. The 56th Division was initially assigned to the Kurume Mobilization District, under the command of the Western District Army.

== History ==
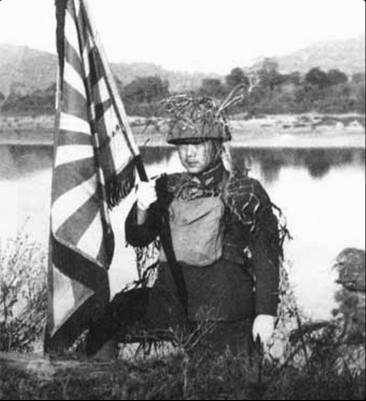
A 56th division officer carries a regimental flag, Burma 1944

In October 1941, the 146th Infantry Regiment and 2nd Battalion of the 56th Field Artillery Regiment were re-organized as the "56th Independent Mixed Regiment" (subordinated to Sakaguchi detachment). It departed from Palau on 16 December 1941 and landed in Davao City on 17 December 1941 and sailed again on 7 January 1942 to Tarakan. Afterwards, it was slated for the Borneo invasion. On 21 January 1942 it sailed from Tarakan to Balikpapan and on 19 February 1942, the Sakaguchi detachment was sent to eastern Java, arriving on 1 March 1942, to cooperate with the 48th Division. The Sakaguchi detachment is credited with the capture of Cilacap Regency port after a 400 km long march. The detachment was merged back into the 56th Division in April 1942.

With the Pacific War becoming imminent, the 56th Division was fully mobilized in November 1941. Although initially the 56th division was slated as reinforcements for the Japanese invasion of Malaya, the rapid cessation of British resistance have resulted in division been attached to 25th Army and sent to Burma in March 1942, landing in Rangoon and participating in the Battle of Toungoo. The 56th Division linked with the 55th Division in Toungoo on 28 March 1942. Its reconnaissance elements forced the Chinese to evacuate the city opening the way to the east. Later the 56th Division flanked the allied line to the east, by advancing through the mountains to the Salween River in the Karenni States. The Division defeated the Chinese 6th Corps in the Karen Hills area battles of Mawchi on 13 April 1942, Bawlake, Bato, Taunggyi and Loikaw on 20 April 1942, and forced their retreat eastward to Yunnan. Advancing north through the Shan States the 56th Division defeated elements of the Chinese 65th Corps to take the city of Lashio on the Burma Road. The fall of Lashio to the 56th Division on 29 April 1942 cut off much of the local Chinese Army from China and compelled the Allies to evacuate Burma. The Division advanced into Yunnan in pursuit of the Chinese but were halted at the Battle of Salween River by the Chinese 36th Division on 5 May 1942.

From May 1942, the 56th Division mostly performed garrison duties on the Yunnan border. The 113th Infantry Regiment was mostly in Yunnan, except for the 3rd Battalion. which was stationed in Longling County. The 148th Infantry Regiment was stationed in Tengchong. The heavy fighting resumed in January 1944 with the Battle of Lashio (1944), as part of Battle of Northern Burma and Western Yunnan campaign in 1944. During the campaign, the division's 114th Infantry Regiment, borrowed from the 18th Division, was credited with shattering Merrill's Marauders in the Siege of Myitkyina in May–August 1944 and in delaying the 15:1 superior Chinese forces and inflicting heavy Chinese casualties during the Battle of Mount Song. Faced with numerically and better equipped enemy in an attrition battle, the 56th Division suffered heavy losses. The remnants of the division were removed from the front line in October 1944, and on the day of the surrender of Japan, 15 August 1945, on the border between South Burma and Thailand.

== See also ==
- List of Japanese Infantry Divisions

== Notes ==
- This article incorporates material from Japanese Wikipedia page 第56師団 (日本軍), accessed 9 June 2016

== Reference and further reading ==
- Madej, W. Victor. Japanese Armed Forces Order of Battle, 1937-1945 [2 vols]

Allentown, PA: 1981
