= 25th Division (Imperial Japanese Army) =

- Active: 1940 - 1945
- Country: Empire of Japan
- Branch: Imperial Japanese Army
- Type: Infantry
- Garrison/HQ: Mudanjiang, Manchukuo
- Nickname(s): Country Division
- Engagements: Second Sino-Japanese War

The 25th Division (第25師団, Dai-nijūgo Shidan) was an infantry division in the Imperial Japanese Army. Its call-sign was the Country Division (国兵団, Kunihei-dan).

== History ==
The 25th Division was formed in Tonei (東寧), present day Mudanjiang, Manchukuo on 10 July 1940, out of two pre-existing infantry regiments and a number of miscellaneous units and placed under the 5th Army of the Kwantung Army as part of the final defenses of Manchukuo against the Soviet army.

In March 1945, it was withdrawn to Japan, and assigned to Kobayashi, Miyazaki as part of the final defense of the Japanese home islands against the projected American invasion (Operation Downfall). Overall, the 25th division has never seen any combat.

Japanese infantry and armored units in Home Islands, 15 August 1945

== See also ==
- List of Japanese Infantry Divisions

== Reference and further reading ==
- Madej, W. Victor. Japanese Armed Forces Order of Battle, 1937-1945 [2 vols] Allentown, PA: 1981
- This article incorporates material from the Japanese Wikipedia page 第25師団 (日本軍), accessed 8 March 2016.
