= Army of Tokyo Bay =

- Active: June 19, 1945 – August 15, 1945
- Country: Empire of Japan
- Branch: Imperial Japanese Army
- Type: Infantry
- Role: Corps
- Size: Corps
- Garrison/HQ: Tateyama, Chiba
- Nicknames: Fringe (房, Fusa)
- Engagements: none

Commanders
- Notable commanders: Shihei Ooba; Toyoaki Yamauchi

The Army of Tokyo Bay (東京湾兵団, Tokyo wan heidan) was an infantry army corps of the Imperial Japanese Army (IJA) during the final days of World War II that specialized in combined arms operations to defend against an Allied forces amphibious landing in Kantō region area and Tokyo Bay coastal defense.

== History ==
The Japanese Army of Tokyo Bay was formed 19 June 1945, under the 12th area army as part of the last desperate defense effort by the Empire of Japan to deter possible landings of Allied forces in Kantō region. The Army of Tokyo Bay was based in Tateyama, Chiba. It consisted mostly of poorly trained reservists, conscripted students and Volunteer Fighting Corps (Kokumin Giyū Sentōtai) home guard militia. It was demobilized at the Surrender of Japan on August 15, 1945, without having seen combat.

== References and notes ==
- This article incorporates material from Japanese Wikipedia page 東京湾兵団, accessed 22 July 2016
