= Fifty-Fourth Army (Japan) =

Japanese Fifty-Fourth Army
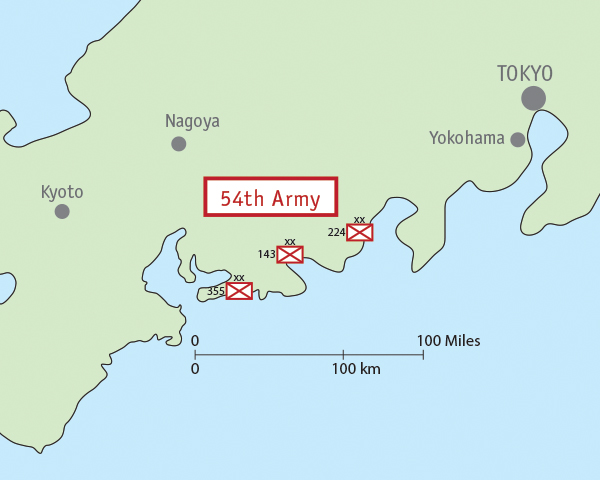
- Active: June 19, 1945 – August 15, 1945
- Country: Empire of Japan
- Branch: Imperial Japanese Army
- Type: Infantry
- Role: Corps
- Garrison/HQ: Shinshiro, Aichi
- Nicknames: Satsu (颯, Dashing)
- Engagements: Operation Downfall

The Japanese 54th Army (第54軍, Dai-gojyūyon gun) was an army of the Imperial Japanese Army during the final days of World War II.

== History ==
The Japanese 54th Army was formed on June 19, 1945, under the Japanese 13th Area Army as part of the last desperate defense effort by the Empire of Japan to deter possible landings of Allied forces in central Honshū during Operation Downfall. The Japanese 54th Army was based in Shinshiro, Aichi Prefecture and was thus intended to guard the approaches and beachheads to Nagoya and the Chūbu region of Japan. It consisted mostly of poorly trained reservists, conscripted students and home guard militia. Most of its units were still in training, and had neither weapons nor ammunition at the time of their demobilization at the surrender of Japan on August 15, 1945, without having seen combat.

== List of Commanders ==
	Name	From	To
Commanding officer	Lieutenant General Nobuo Kobayashi	15 Jun 1945	15 August 1945
Chief of Staff	Major General Morihiko Hanamoto	1 June 1945	20 September 1945
