= Fifty-Fifth Army (Japan) =

Japanese Fifty-Fifth Army
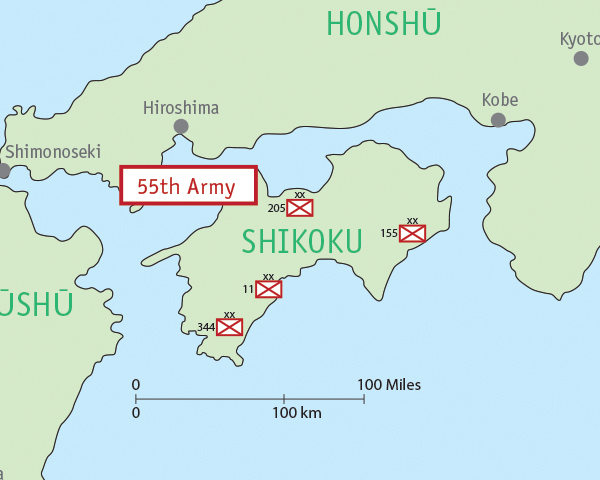
- Active: April 8, 1945 – August 15, 1945
- Country: Empire of Japan
- Branch: Imperial Japanese Army
- Type: Infantry
- Role: Corps
- Engagements: Operation Downfall

The Japanese 55th Army (第55軍, Dai-gojyūgo gun) was an army of the Imperial Japanese Army during the final days of World War II.

== History ==
The Japanese 55th Army was formed on April 8, 1945, under the Japanese 15th Area Army as part of the last desperate defense effort by the Empire of Japan to deter possible landings of Allied forces in Shikoku during Operation Downfall. From June 15, the commander of the 55th Army was also commander in chief of all Japanese forces on Shikoku, and received his appointment directly from Emperor Hirohito.

The Japanese 55th Army was based in Kōchi city, Kōchi Prefecture. Despite its prestigious status of reporting directly to the emperor, as with other emergency army corps raised during this time, it consisted mostly of poorly trained and poorly armed reservists, conscripted students and Volunteer Fighting Corps home guard militia. It was demobilized at the surrender of Japan on August 15, 1945, without having seen combat.

== List of commanders ==
	Name	From	To
Commanding officer	Lieutenant General Kumakichi Harada	7 April 1945	15 August 1945
Chief of Staff	Major General Koshiro Terakura	6 April 1945	21 June 1945
Chief of Staff	Major General Masataka Kaburagi	21 June 1945	20 September 1945
