= Seventeenth Area Army =

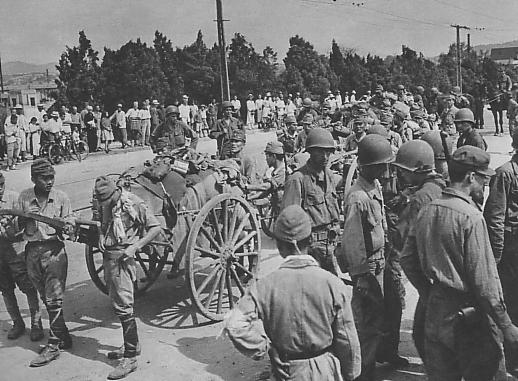
- Withdrawal of Japanese troops from Korea
- Active: January 22, 1945 – August 15, 1945
- Country: Empire of Japan
- Branch: Imperial Japanese Army
- Type: Infantry
- Role: Field Army
- Garrison/HQ: Keijō
- Nickname: 築 (chiku = "construct")
- Engagements: Soviet invasion of Manchuria

The Seventeenth Area Army (第 17方面軍, Dai-jūnana hōmen gun) was a field army of the Imperial Japanese Army during the final stages of World War II.

== History ==
The Japanese 17th Area Army was formed on January 22, 1945, under the Imperial General Headquarters as the successor to the Chosen Army of Japan as part of the last desperate defense effort by the Empire of Japan to deter possible landings of Allied forces on the Korean Peninsula during Operation Downfall (or Operation Ketsugō (決号作戦, Ketsugō sakusen) in Japanese terminology). It was headquartered in Keijō. However, the actual administrative structure of the former Chosen Army remained in place, and thus the leadership of the 17th Area Army concurrently held the equivalent posts within the Chosen Army, which was also called the Korean District Army.

As with the field armies raised on the Japanese home islands it consisted mostly of poorly trained reservists, conscripted students and home guard militia, as most of the veteran, trained troops of the Chosen Army had already been transferred to other fronts in the Pacific War. In addition, the Japanese had organized the Patriotic Citizens Fighting Corps—which included all healthy men aged 15–60 and women 17–40—to perform combat support, and ultimately combat jobs. Weapons, training, and uniforms were generally lacking: some men were armed with nothing better than muzzle-loading muskets, longbows, or bamboo spears; nevertheless, they were expected to make do with what they had.

On August 10, 1945, the 17th Area Army was transferred to the control of the Kwantung Army and ordered north to oppose the Soviet Red Army forces advancing southward in Manchukuo. However, the war came to an end before the 17th Area Army could cross the Yalu River.

The 17th Area Army was thus demobilized without having seen combat, and units remained armed and in their garrisons until Red Army and United States Army forces arrived in Korea.

== List of Commanders ==
=== Commanding officer ===
	Name	From	To
1	General Seishirō Itagaki	1 February 1945	20 April 1945
2	Lieutenant General Yoshio Kozuki	20 April 1945	15 August 1945

=== Chief of Staff ===
	Name	From	To
1	Lieutenant General Juntaro Iihara	1 February 1945	15 August 1945
