= Fifty-Third Army (Japan) =

Japanese Fifty-Third Army
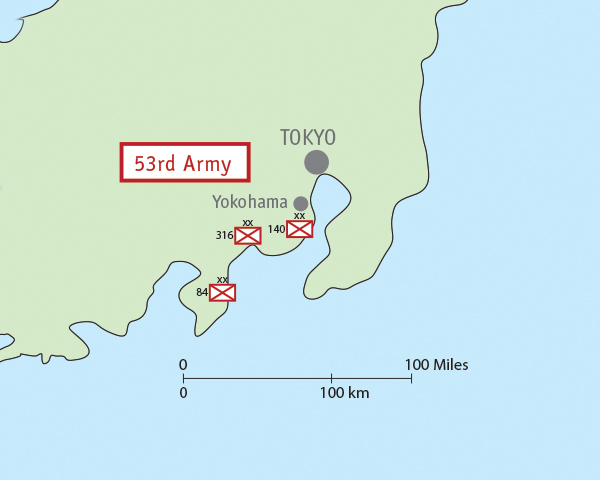
- Active: April 8, 1945 – August 15, 1945
- Disbanded: August 15, 1945
- Country: Japan
- Branch: Imperial Japanese Army
- Type: Infantry
- Role: Corps
- Engagements: World War II: Operation Downfall

The Japanese 53rd Army (第53軍, Dai-gojyūsan gun) was an army of the Imperial Japanese Army during the final days of World War II.

== History ==
The Japanese 53rd Army was formed on April 8, 1945, under the Japanese 12th Area Army, as part of the last desperate defense effort by the Empire of Japan to deter possible landings of Allied forces in central Honshū during Operation Downfall. The Japanese 53rd Army was based in Isehara, Kanagawa Prefecture and was thus intended to guard the western approaches and beachheads to Tokyo along Sagami Bay. It consisted mostly of poorly trained reservists, conscripted students and Volunteer Fighting Corps home guard militia. It was demobilized at the surrender of Japan on August 15, 1945, without having seen combat.

== List of Commanders ==
	Name	From	To
Commanding officer	Lieutenant General Yaezo Akashiba	7 April 1945	15 August 1945
Chief of Staff	Major General Hiroshi Onoda	6 April 1945	10 September 1945

== Bibliography ==
- Drea, Edward J. (1998). "Japanese Preparations for the Defense of the Homeland & Intelligence Forecasting for the Invasion of Japan". In the Service of the Emperor: Essays on the Imperial Japanese Army. University of Nebraska Press. ISBN 0-8032-1708-0.
- Frank, Richard B (1999). Downfall: The End of the Imperial Japanese Empire. New York: Random House. ISBN 0-679-41424-X.
- Jowett, Bernard (1999). The Japanese Army 1931-45 (Volume 2, 1942-45). Osprey Publishing. ISBN 1-84176-354-3.
- Madej, Victor (1981). Japanese Armed Forces Order of Battle, 1937-1945. Game Publishing Company. ASIN: B000L4CYWW.
- Marston, Daniel (2005). The Pacific War Companion: From Pearl Harbor to Hiroshima. Osprey Publishing. ISBN 1-84176-882-0.
- Skates, John Ray (1994). The Invasion of Japan: Alternative to the Bomb Downfall. New York: University of South Carolina Press. ISBN 0-87249-972-3.
- Zaloga, Steven L (2010). Defense of Japan. Oxford, U.K.: Osprey Publishing. ISBN 1-58545-044-8.
