= Fifty-Seventh Army (Japan) =

Japanese Fifty-Seventh Army
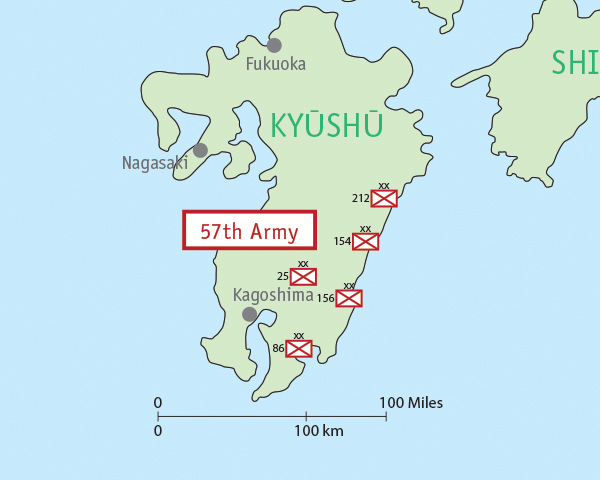
- Active: April 8, 1945 – August 15, 1945
- Country: Empire of Japan
- Branch: Imperial Japanese Army
- Type: Infantry
- Role: Corps
- Engagements: Operation Downfall

The Japanese 57th Army (第57軍, Dai-gojyūnana gun) was an army of the Imperial Japanese Army during the final days of World War II.

== History ==
The Japanese 57th Army was formed on April 8, 1945, under the Japanese 16th Area Army as part of the last desperate defense effort by the Empire of Japan to deter possible landings of Allied forces in southern Kyūshū during Operation Downfall. The Japanese 57th Army was based in Takarabe town, Kagoshima Prefecture. It consisted mostly of poorly trained reservists, conscripted students and home guard militia.

Although the Japanese were able to raise large numbers of new soldiers, equipping them was more difficult. By August, the Japanese Army had the equivalent of 65 divisions in the homeland but only enough equipment for 40 and only enough ammunition for 30.

The Japanese did not formally decide to stake everything on the outcome of the Battle of Kyūshū, but they concentrated their assets to such a degree that there would be little left in reserve. By one estimate, the forces in Kyūshū had 40% of all the remaining ammunition in the Home Islands.

In addition, the Japanese had organized the Patriotic Citizens Fighting Corps—which included all healthy men aged 15–60 and women 17–40—to perform combat support, and ultimately combat jobs. Weapons, training, and uniforms were generally lacking: some men were armed with nothing better than muzzle-loading muskets, longbows, or bamboo spears; nevertheless, they were expected to make do with what they had.

The 57th Army was demobilized at the surrender of Japan on August 15, 1945, without having seen combat.

== List of Commanders ==
	Name	From	To
Commanding officer	Lieutenant General Kanji Nishihara	6 April 1945	1 September 1945
Chief of Staff	Major General Yasumasa Yoshitake	6 April 1945	1 September 1945
