= Eleventh Area Army =

- Active: February 6, 1945 - August 15, 1945
- Country: Empire of Japan
- Branch: Imperial Japanese Army
- Type: Infantry
- Role: Field Army
- Garrison/HQ: Sendai, Miyagi
- Nickname(s): 進 (Shin = “advancing”)

The Eleventh Area Army (第11方面軍, Dai jyūichi hōmen gun) was a field army of the Imperial Japanese Army during World War II.

The Japanese 11th Area Army was formed on February 6, 1945 under the Imperial General Headquarters and transferred to the control of the Japanese First General Army on April 8, 1945. It was part of the last desperate defense effort by the Empire of Japan to deter possible landings of Allied forces in central Honshū during Operation Downfall (or Operation Ketsugō (決号作戦, Ketsugō sakusen) in Japanese terminology). The Japanese 11th Area Army was responsible for the Tōhoku region of Japan and was headquartered in Sendai, Miyagi.

It consisted mostly of poorly trained reservists, conscripted students and home guard militia. In addition, the Japanese had organized the Volunteer Fighting Corps — which included all healthy men aged 15 to 60 and women 17 to 40 — to perform combat support, and ultimately combat jobs. Weapons, training, and uniforms were generally lacking: some men were armed with nothing better than muzzle-loading muskets, longbows, or bamboo spears; nevertheless, they were expected to make do with what they had.

The 11th Area Army was demobilized at the surrender of Japan on August 15, 1945 without having seen combat.

== List of commanders ==
=== Commanding officer ===
	Name	From	To
1	General Teiichi Yoshimoto	February 6, 1945	August 7, 1945
2	General Keisuke Fujie	August 7, 1945	August 15, 1945

=== Chief of staff ===
	Name	From	To
1	Major General Masayoshi Ishii	February 6, 1945	August 7, 1945
2	Major General Kazufumi Imai	August 7, 1945	August 25, 1945
