= Thirteenth Area Army =

- Active: February 1, 1945 - August 15, 1945
- Country: Empire of Japan
- Branch: Imperial Japanese Army
- Type: Infantry
- Role: Field Army
- Garrison/HQ: Nagoya
- Nickname(s): 秀 (Shū = “excellence”)

The Thirteenth Area Army (第13方面軍, Dai-jyūhachi hōmen gun) was a field army of the Imperial Japanese Army during the final stages of World War II.

== History ==
The Japanese 13th Area Army was formed on 1945-02-01 under the Japanese First General Army as part of the last desperate defense effort by the Empire of Japan to deter possible landings of Allied forces in central Honshū during Operation Downfall (or Operation Ketsugō (決号作戦, Ketsugō sakusen) in Japanese terminology). The Japanese 13th Area Army was responsible for the Tōkai region of Japan and was headquartered in Nagoya.

It consisted mostly of poorly trained reservists, conscripted students and home guard militia. In addition, the Japanese had organized the Patriotic Citizens Fighting Corps — which included all healthy men aged 15–60 and women 17–40 — to perform combat support, and ultimately combat jobs. Weapons, training, and uniforms were generally lacking: some men were armed with nothing better than muzzle-loading muskets, longbows, or bamboo spears; nevertheless, they were expected to make do with what they had.

The 13th Area Army was demobilized at the surrender of Japan on August 15, 1945 without having seen combat.

== List of Commanders ==
	Name	From	To
Commanding officer	Lieutenant General Tasuku Okada	1 February 1945	15 August 1945
Chief of Staff	Major General Masuzo Fujimura	1 February 1945	5 July 1945
Chief of Staff	Major General Yoshizo Shibata	5 July 1945	22 October 1945
