= Fortieth Army (Japan) =

Japanese Fortieth Army
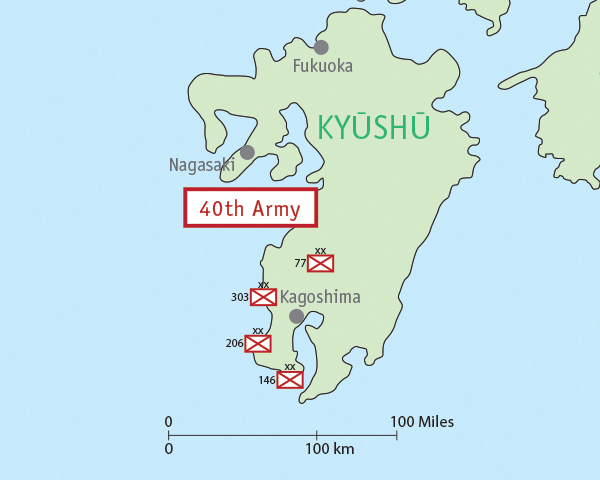
- Active: January 12, 1945 - August 15, 1945
- Country: Empire of Japan
- Branch: Imperial Japanese Army
- Type: Infantry
- Role: Corps
- Garrison/HQ: Ijuin, Kagoshima
- Nickname(s): Yō (陽, positive)
- Engagements: Operation Downfall

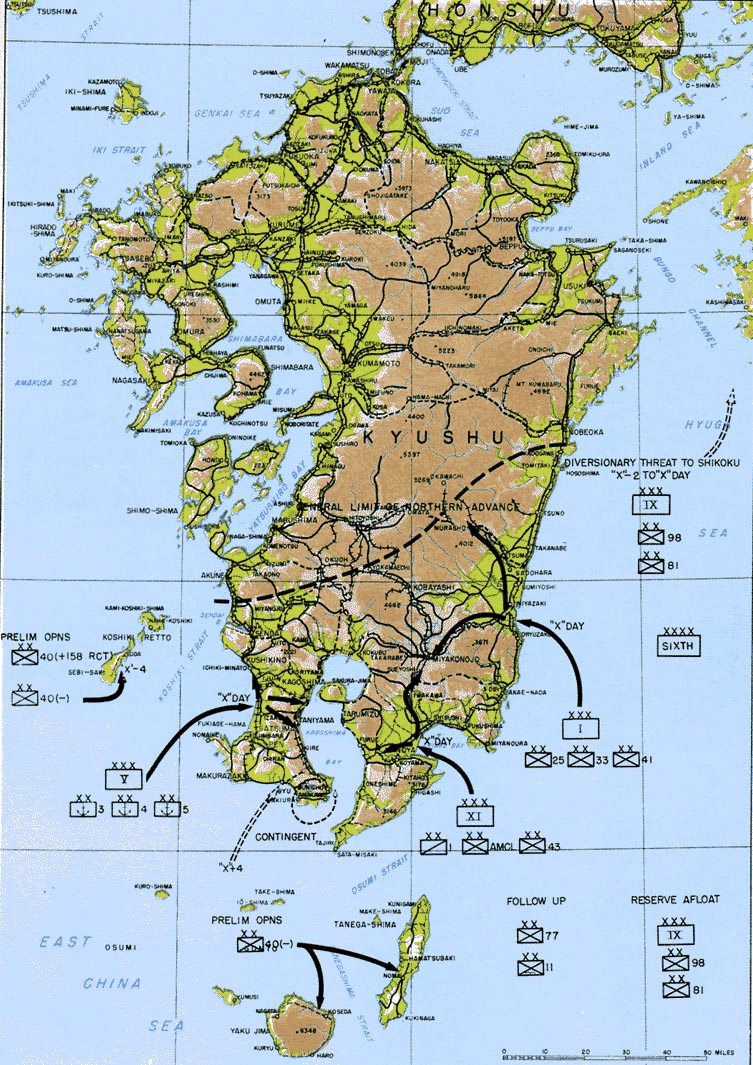
Planned Allied landings on Kyūshū during Operation Downfall.

The Japanese 40th Army (第40軍, Dai-yonjyū gun) was an army of the Imperial Japanese Army during the final stages of World War II.

== History ==
The Japanese 40th Army was formed on January 8, 1945 in Chiayi, Taiwan, and subordinated to the Japanese 10 Area Army 16 January 1945.

As part of the last desperate defense effort by the Empire of Japan to deter possible landings of Allied forces in southern Kyūshū during Operation Downfall, the 40th Army headquarters were transferred to Kagoshima 14 May 1945. The thus reformed 40th Army consisted mostly of poorly trained and poorly armed reservists, conscripted students and home guard militia.

In addition, the Japanese had organized the Patriotic Citizens Fighting Corps — which included all healthy men aged 15–60 and women 17–40 — to perform combat support, and ultimately combat jobs. Weapons, training, and uniforms were generally lacking: some men were armed with nothing better than muzzle-loading muskets, longbows, or bamboo spears; nevertheless, they were expected to make do with what they had.

One mobilized high school girl, Yukiko Kasai, found herself issued an awl and told, "Even killing one American soldier will do. … You must aim for the abdomen."

It was demobilized at the surrender of Japan on August 15, 1945 without having seen combat.

== List of Commanders ==
	Name	From	To
Commanding officer	Lieutenant General Mitsuo Nakasawa	12 January 1945	15 August 1945
Chief of Staff	Major General Kyuji Adachi	12 January 1945	15 August 1945
