= Triangular division =

Type of military division organization

A triangular division is a designation given to the way military divisions are organized. In a triangular organization, the division's main body is composed of three regimental maneuver elements. These regiments may be controlled by a brigade headquarters (more typical in World War I) or directly subordinated to the division commander. By contrast, in a square division, there were typically two brigades of two regiments. Other structures are possible, such as a pentomic division, where the division commander controls five maneuver elements, which was used in the United States Army in the late 1950s, with the regiments replaced by combined arms battlegroups.

== Asia ==
Imperial Japanese Army and National Revolutionary Army Divisions were organized as square divisions prior to 1938 when they began to form triangular divisions during the Second Sino-Japanese War.

== Europe ==
Most European armies reorganized their divisions as triangular divisions during World War I, and retained that structure since. Many European armies now place greater emphasis on the brigade and in some cases, such as the Portuguese and the Belgian armies, have eliminated the division entirely as a tactical unit.

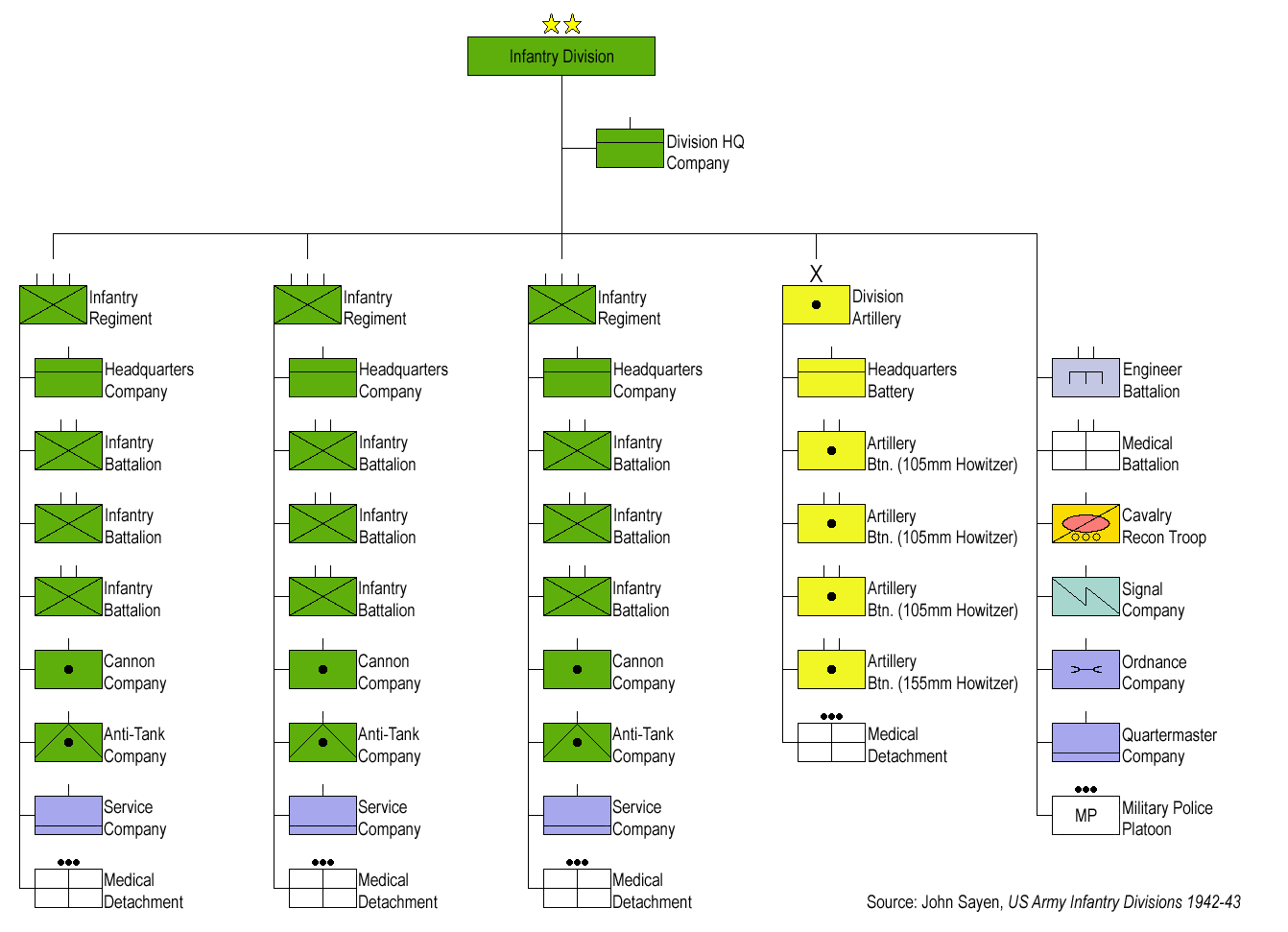
Triangular Division example: 1942 US Infantry Division. The brigades of the square division have been removed, and there are three regiments directly under divisional control

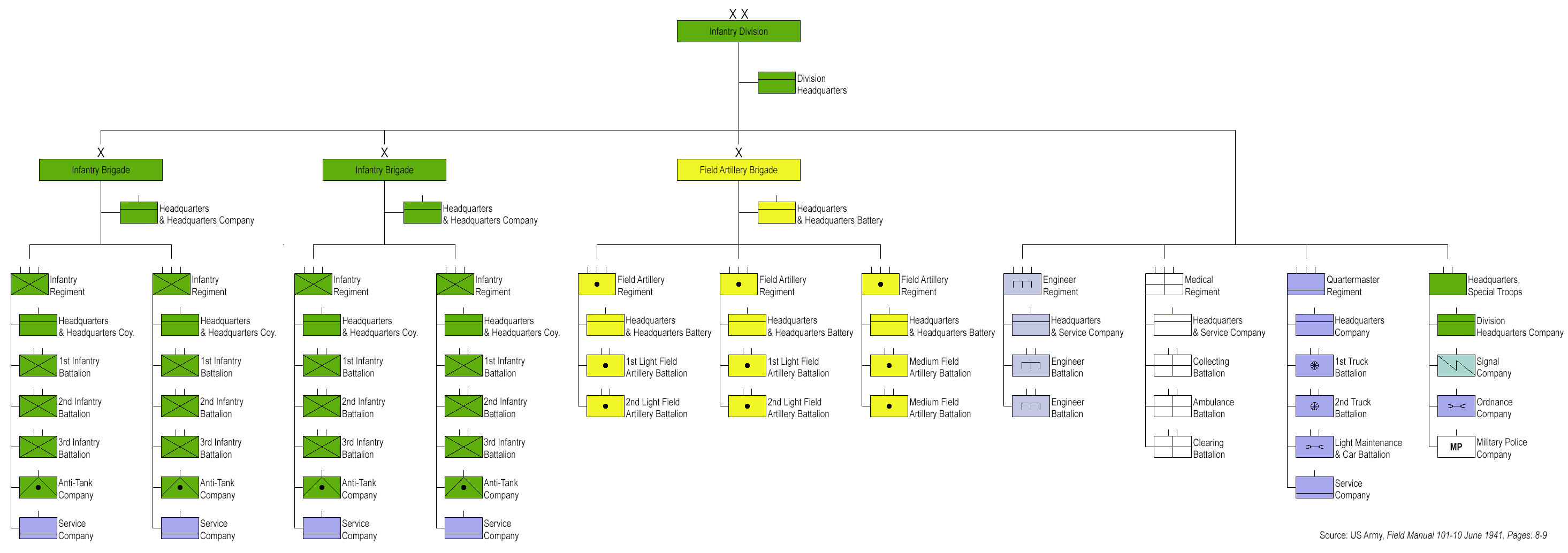
Square Division example: 1940 US Infantry Division. On the far left can be seen two brigades of two regiments each

== United States ==
United States Army divisions were square divisions until the beginning of World War II; reorganization as triangular divisions first occurred in late 1939, lasting through early 1942. During that war, infantry divisions were typically triangular, with the division controlling three infantry regiments. Armored divisions were also triangular, but typically organized into combined arms "combat commands" (denoted Combat Command A, Combat Command B, and Combat Command Reserve). After World War II, this structure was retained until the "Pentomic Era" described above. In the 1960s, United States Army divisions were reorganized as triangular divisions, but with the division controlling three combined arms brigades. Combined arms doctrine has all but eliminated regimental purpose, and regiments generally exist only as traditional designations. In the first decade of the 21st century, the United States Army began another reorganization, giving the division four brigades and placing more emphasis on the brigade as the main tactical element, with the division acting more like a corps headquarters, parceling out support units to the brigades.

== Soviet Union and Russia ==
Soviet Army divisions during World War II were generally triangular, with three subordinate regiments. Post-war reforms led to a four-regiment division, with three regiments of one arm (tank or motorized infantry) and the fourth of the other arm. In combat operations, however, the fourth regiment could be divided among the other three to create three combined arms formations essentially the same as a brigade. This structure has for the most part been retained in the Russian Army. See, for example, the organization of the 2nd Guards Tamanskaya Motor Rifle Division.

== See also ==
- Square division
