= Square division =

Type of military division organization

A square division is a designation given to the way military divisions are organized. In a square organization, the division's main body is composed of four "maneuver," i.e., infantry regimental elements. Other types of regiments, such as artillery, are not "maneuver" units and thus are not considered in the "square," viz, "four" (infantry) regiments scheme.

The usual internal organization within a square division would be two brigades, each comprising two infantry regiments (consisting of two or three battalions.) Hence, on an organizational chart, the two infantry brigade, each with two infantry regiments would resemble a square. However, such divisions typically also include additional, supporting units such as artillery regiments.

By contrast, a triangular division generally has its infantry units organized in a "three by three" format. Historically, this has usually meant three regiments comprising three infantry battalions, with the three regiments either controlled by a single brigade or directly by the divisional headquarters. (In many armies, more recently, the infantry regiment, as a combat formation, has been abolished and triangular divisions are made up of three brigades, each consisting of three battalions.)

In most European armies, divisions were organized as square divisions prior to World War I. They were generally reorganized as triangular divisions during that war. Triangular divisions were smaller, allowing for more divisions to be formed, and were considered more suited for the positional warfare which characterized World War I. (See, for example, the organizational changes within the German Empire's 1st Division.)

A square division typically operates with either: two infantry brigades in line, and one infantry regiment forward and one in reserve, or; on a narrower front, with the brigades echeloned (one ahead of the other), (In contrast, the triangular division normally employs a "two up, one back" arrangement for its three infantry regiments/brigades.) In positional warfare, infantry regiments are formed in line to cover as much of a sector as possible, and are positioned with two battalions forward and one battalion behind, to provide defense in depth. An infantry regimental commander typically holds a reinforced rifle company or two (and rarely an entire battalion) from one of his three infantry battalions, with supporting arms, in the rear as a regimental reserve.

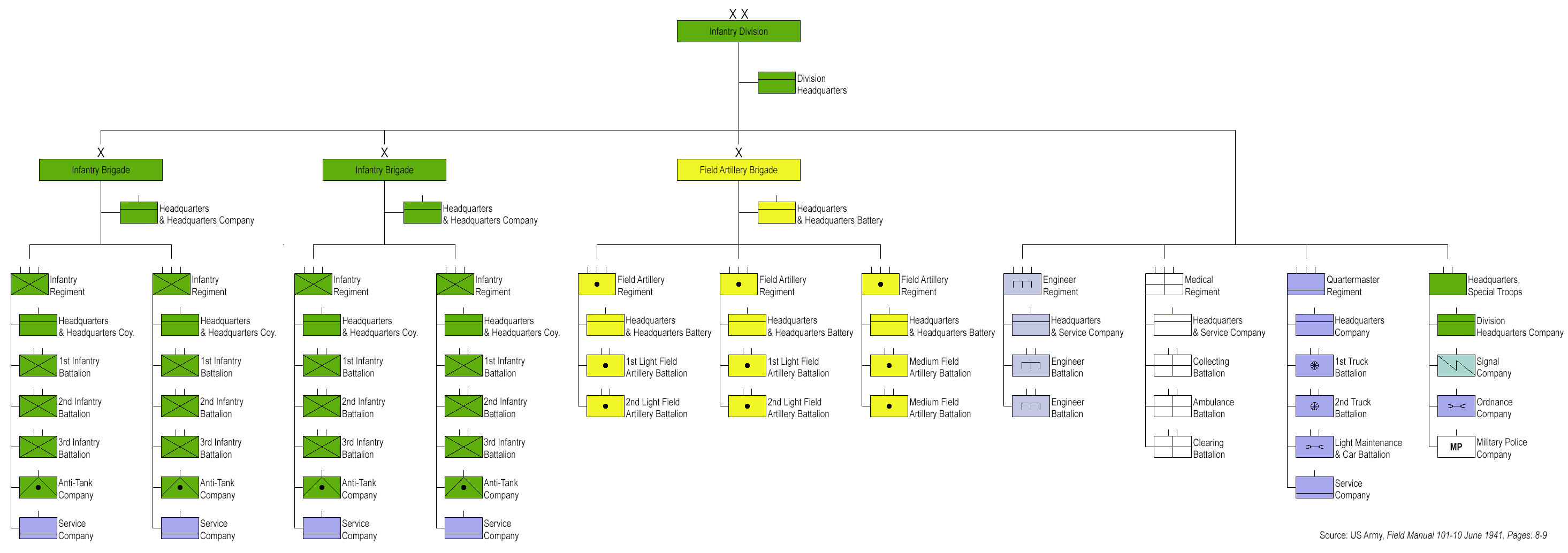
Square division example: 1940 U.S. infantry division. On the far left can be seen two brigades of two regiments each

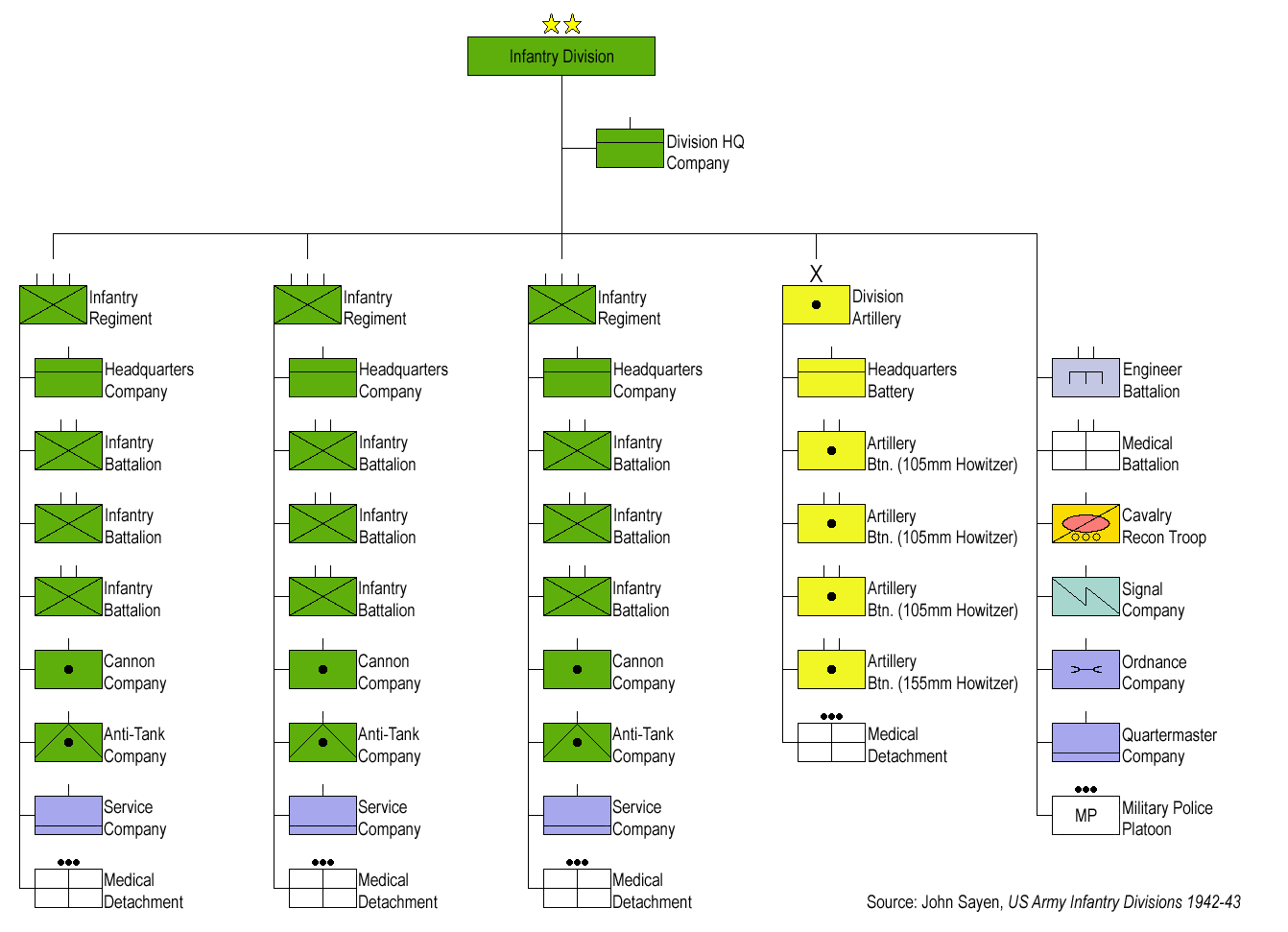
Triangular division example: 1942 U.S. infantry division. The brigades of the square division have been removed, and there are three regiments directly under divisional control.

== United States ==
During World War I, the United States Army formed its divisions as square divisions, in contrast to the prevailing European norm. The United States had the manpower to form the divisions, and expected to be engaging in more offensive operations as the trench warfare stalemate, which consumed so much of the war on the Western Front, was broken late in the war. U.S. Army divisions remained organized as square divisions after the war and up to World War II. In 1940 through early 1942, during World War II, the U.S. Army reorganized its divisions as triangular divisions.

After the war, the major user of all-arms regiments was the Eastern Bloc, first among them the Soviet Ground Forces. Brigades are typically triangular, with three subordinate maneuver battalions and supporting units. Recent reforms in the United States and several European countries have placed greater emphasis on the brigade as the major tactical formation, with the division now acting more like a corps headquarters, controlling several relatively autonomous brigades and parceling out support units based on the tactical situation.

== Japan ==
Imperial Japanese Army divisions were organized as square divisions prior to 1938 when they began to form triangular divisions during the Second Sino-Japanese War.

== China ==
The Chinese National Revolutionary Army divisions were organized as square divisions prior to mid-1938 during the Second Sino-Japanese War.

== See also ==
- Triangular division
