= Operation Downfall order of battle =

Proposed Allied plan of the invasion of the Japanese home islands

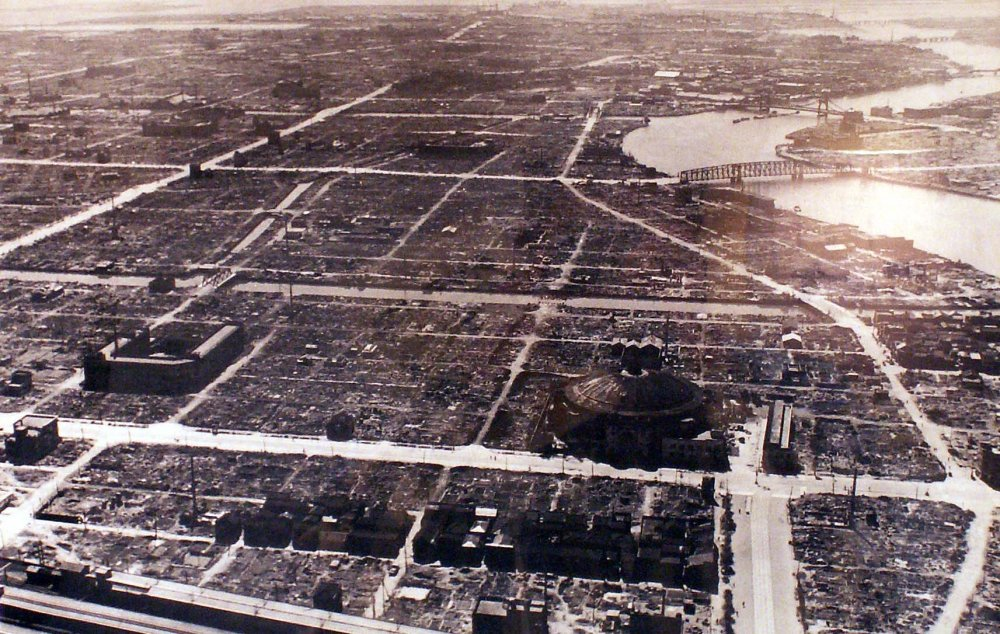
Devastation in Tokyo following US Army Air Force firebombing in March 1945

Proposed landing sites for Operation Downfall

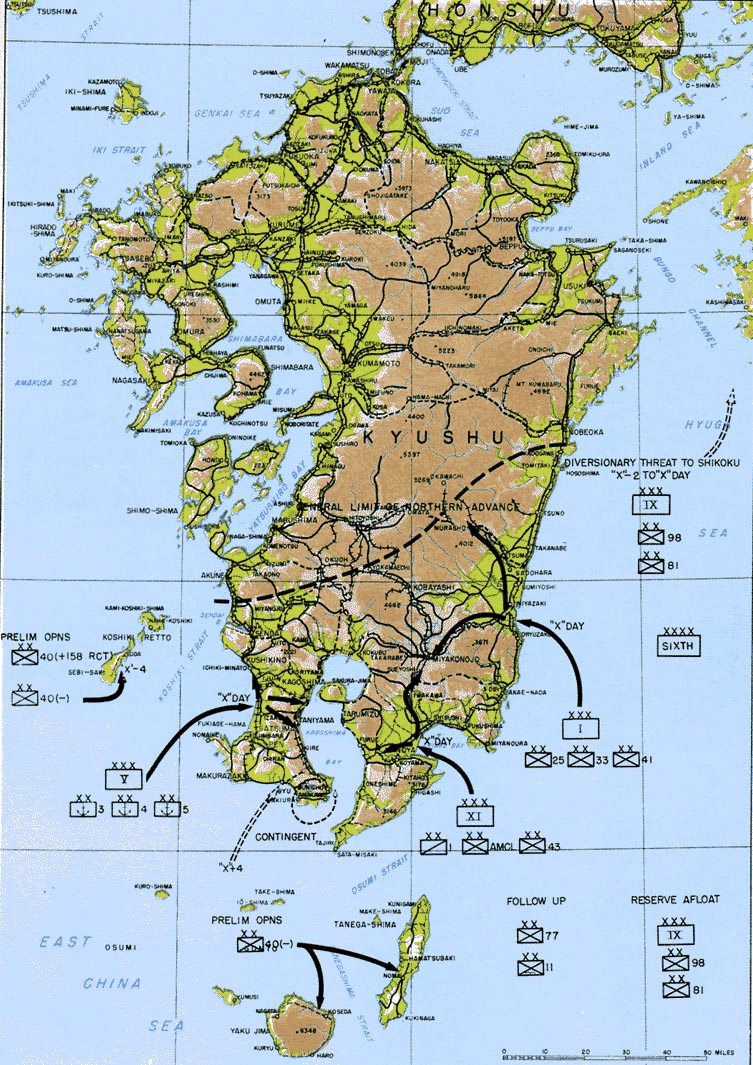
Kyushu

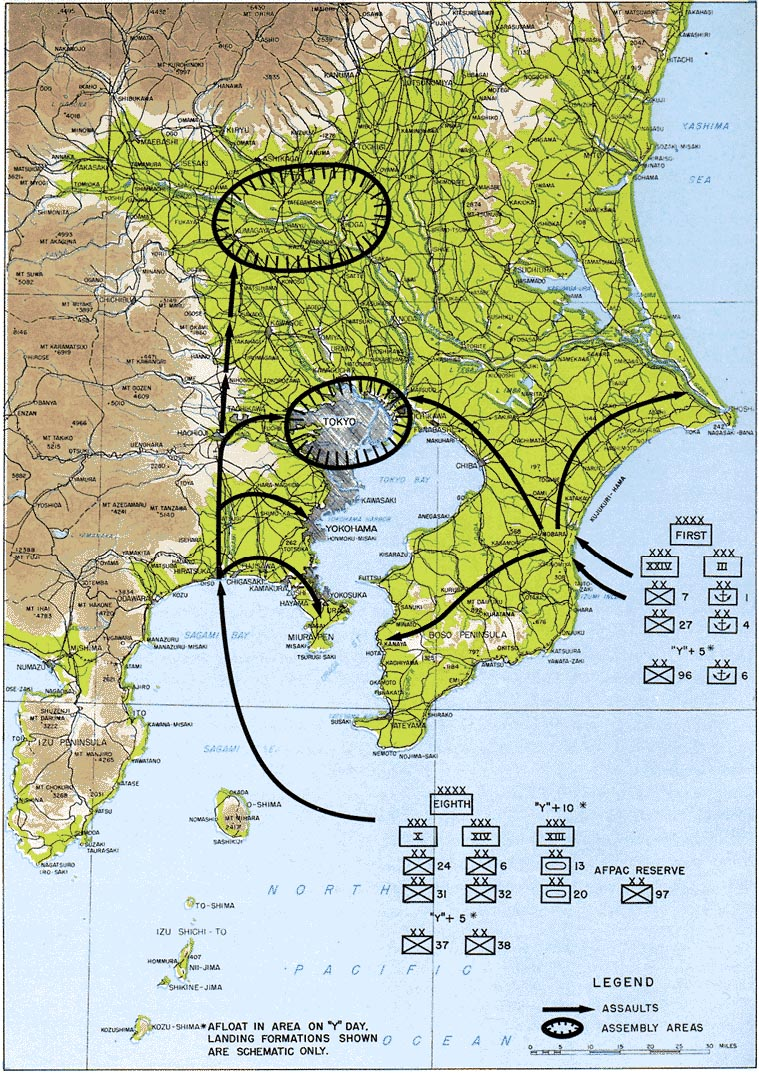
Kantō Plain

Operation Downfall was the proposed Allied plan for the invasion of the Japanese home islands near the end of World War II.

The operation had two parts, Operation Olympic, intended to capture the southern third of the southernmost main Japanese island, Kyūshū, and Operation Coronet, the planned invasion of the Kantō Plain, near Tokyo, on the main Japanese island of Honshu. Olympic was scheduled for November 1945, to be followed by Coronet in early 1946.

If Downfall had taken place, it would have been the largest amphibious operation in history, surpassing D-Day. The planned operation was canceled when Japan surrendered following the atomic bombings of Hiroshima and Nagasaki, the Soviet declaration of war, and the invasion of Manchuria.

== Order of Battle for Olympic ==
=== Allied ===
Theatre and ground force commanders
for the invasion of Japan

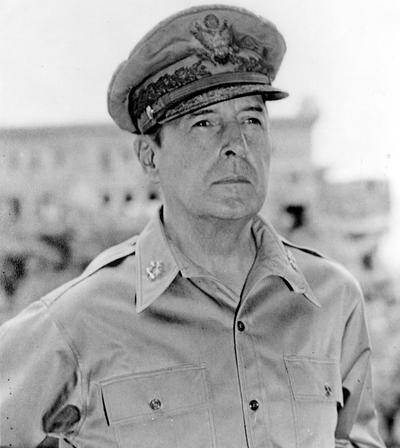
Gen. Douglas MacArthur

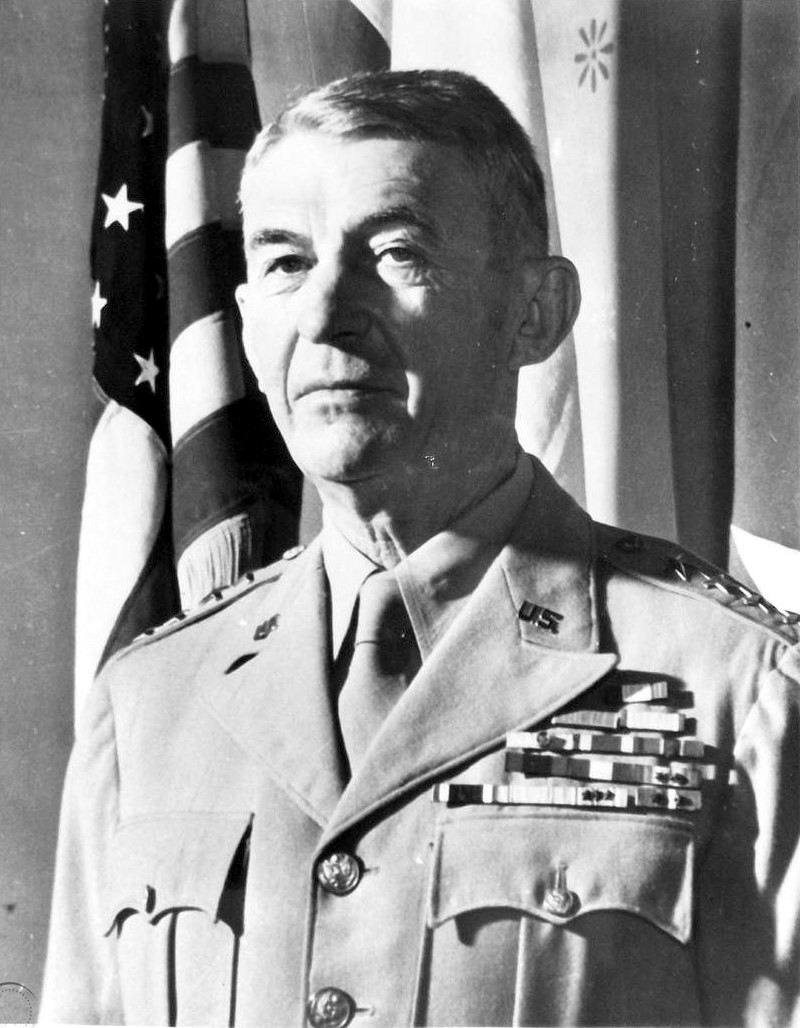
Lt. Gen. Walter Krueger

Supreme Commander, Allied Forces Pacific
General Douglas MacArthur

==== Ground forces ====
Should these four corps prove insufficient to accomplish the tasks assigned, elements earmarked for Coronet would be used to reinforce Sixth Army at the rate of three divisions per month beginning about 30 days after the initial landings.

U.S. Sixth Army
General Walter Krueger

Peripheral landings

40th Infantry Division (Landing on Yakushima and Koshikijima Islands)
158th Infantry Regiment (Landing on Tanegashima)

I Corps (Landing at Miyazaki)
Major General Innis P. Swift

25th Infantry Division
33rd Infantry Division
41st Infantry Division

V Amphibious Corps (Landing at Kushikino)
Major General Harry Schmidt, USMC

3rd Marine Division (Bougainville, Guam, Iwo Jima)
4th Marine Division (Kwajalein, Saipan/Tinian, Iwo Jima)
5th Marine Division (Iwo Jima)

XI Corps (Landing at Ariake)
Major General Charles P. Hall

1st Cavalry Division
Americal Division
43rd Infantry Division

IX Corps (Reserve afloat)
Major General Charles W. Ryder

81st Infantry Division
98th Infantry Division

Follow-up units:

11th Airborne Division
77th Infantry Division

==== Naval forces ====
U.S. fleet commanders

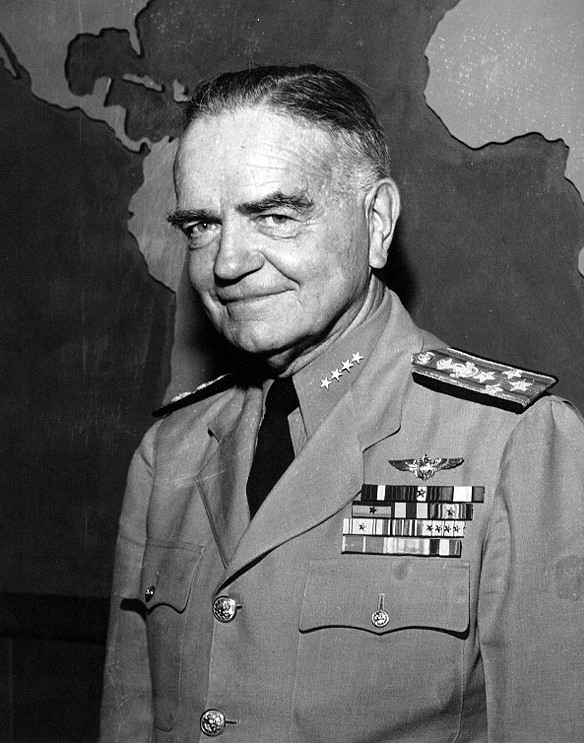
Adm. William F. Halsey

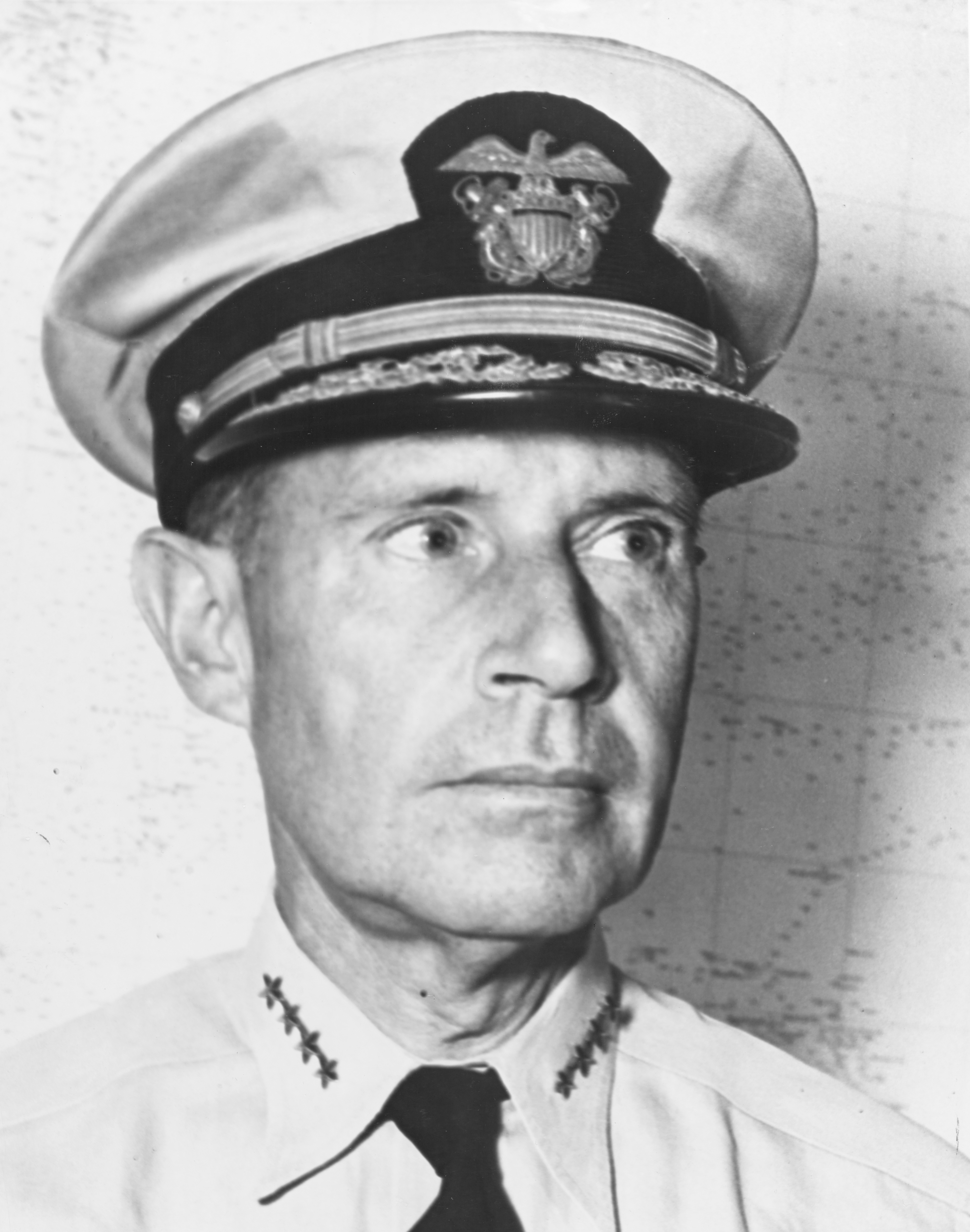
Adm. Raymond A. Spruance

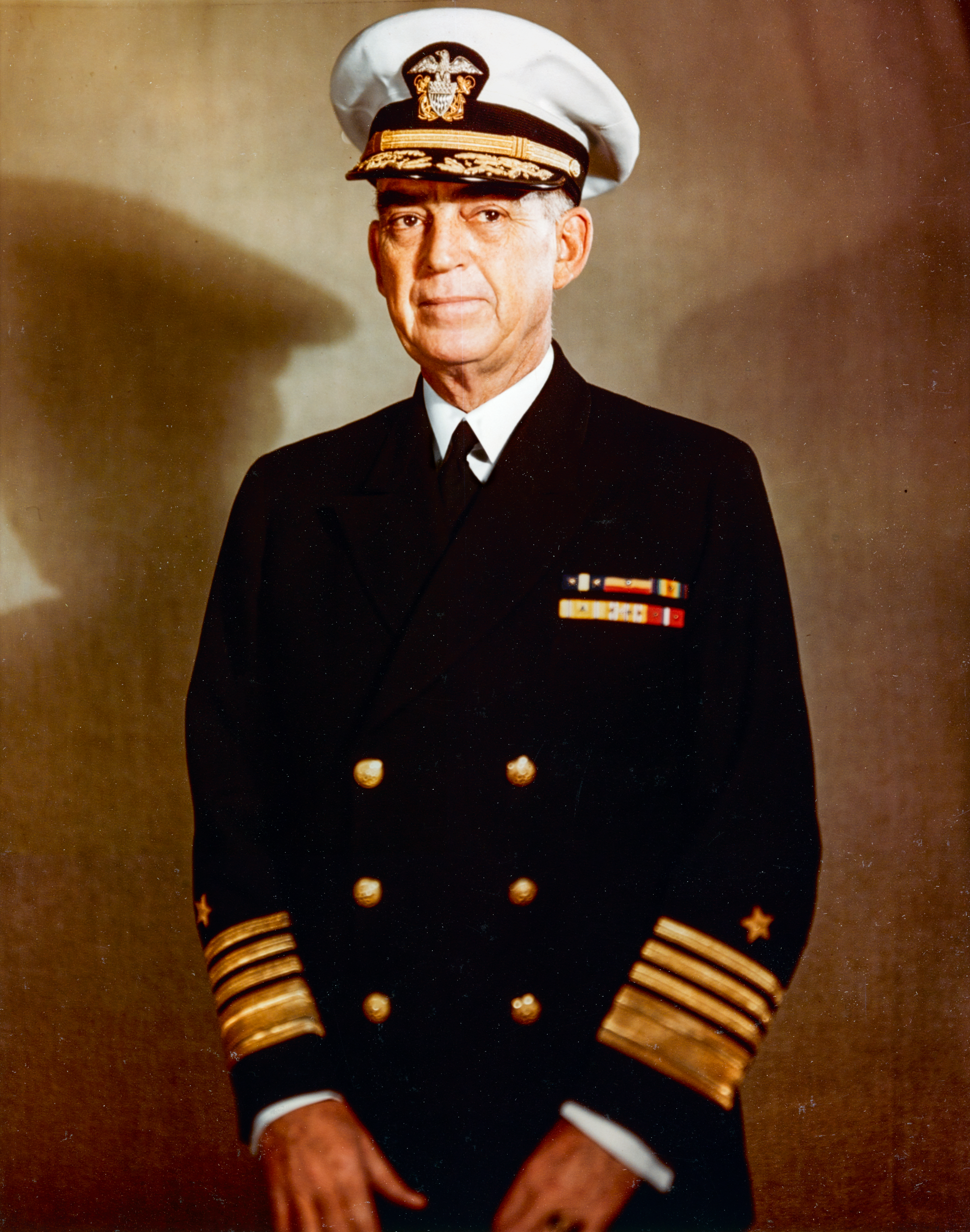
Adm. Thomas C. Kinkaid

Third Fleet
Admiral William F. Halsey

20 fleet and light aircraft carriers
9 battleships
26 cruisers
75 destroyers
incl. British Pacific Fleet

6 fleet and light carriers

Fifth Fleet
Admiral Raymond A. Spruance

36 escort carriers
11 battleships
26 cruisers
387 destroyers and destroyer escorts
394 AKA, AP, APA, APD, APH
977 LSD, LSM, LST, and LSV

Seventh Fleet
Admiral Thomas C. Kinkaid

==== Air forces ====
U.S. air force commanders

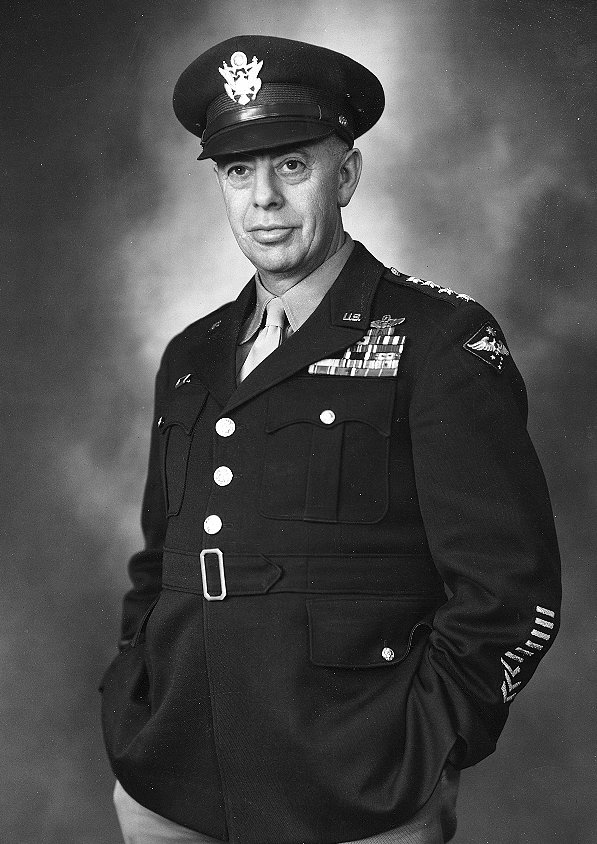
George C. Kenney as a full general

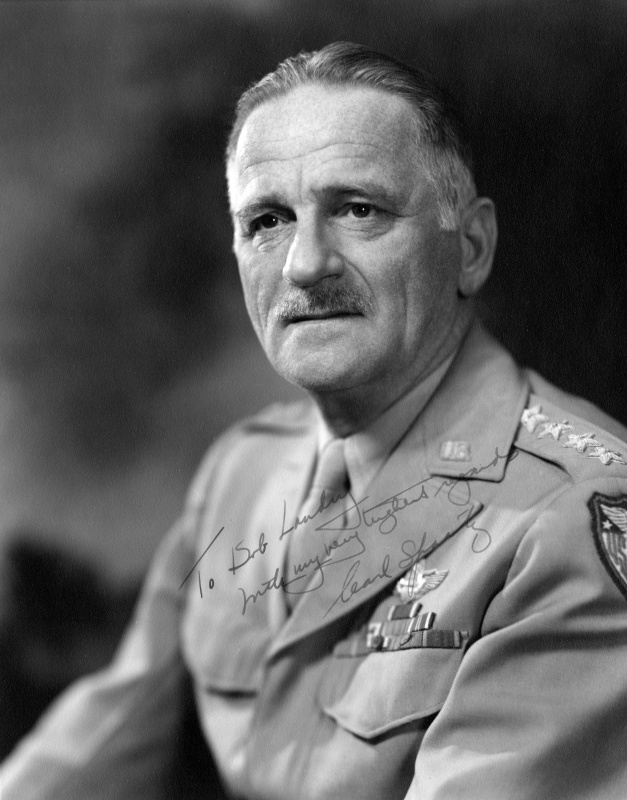
Carl Spaatz as a full general

Far East Air Forces
General George C. Kenney (119,000 men) – 14 bomber groups, 10 fighter groups

Fifth Air Force
Seventh Air Force
Thirteenth Air Force

United States Strategic Air Forces in the Pacific
General Carl A. Spaatz
Major General Curtis E. LeMay (Note: Running mate of segregationist presidential candidate George C. Wallace in 1968.)

Twentieth Air Force (Lt. Gen. Nathan Twining) (77,000 men)

1,000 B-29 Superfortresses

Eighth Air Force (Lt. Gen. Jimmy Doolittle)

Commonwealth forces

Tiger Force (detached from RAF Bomber Command):

480–580 Avro Lancaster bombers (about half to be used as tankers for in-flight refuelling)

Australian First Tactical Air Force

20 fighter/attack squadrons from the Royal Australian Air Force

=== Japan ===
==== Ground forces ====
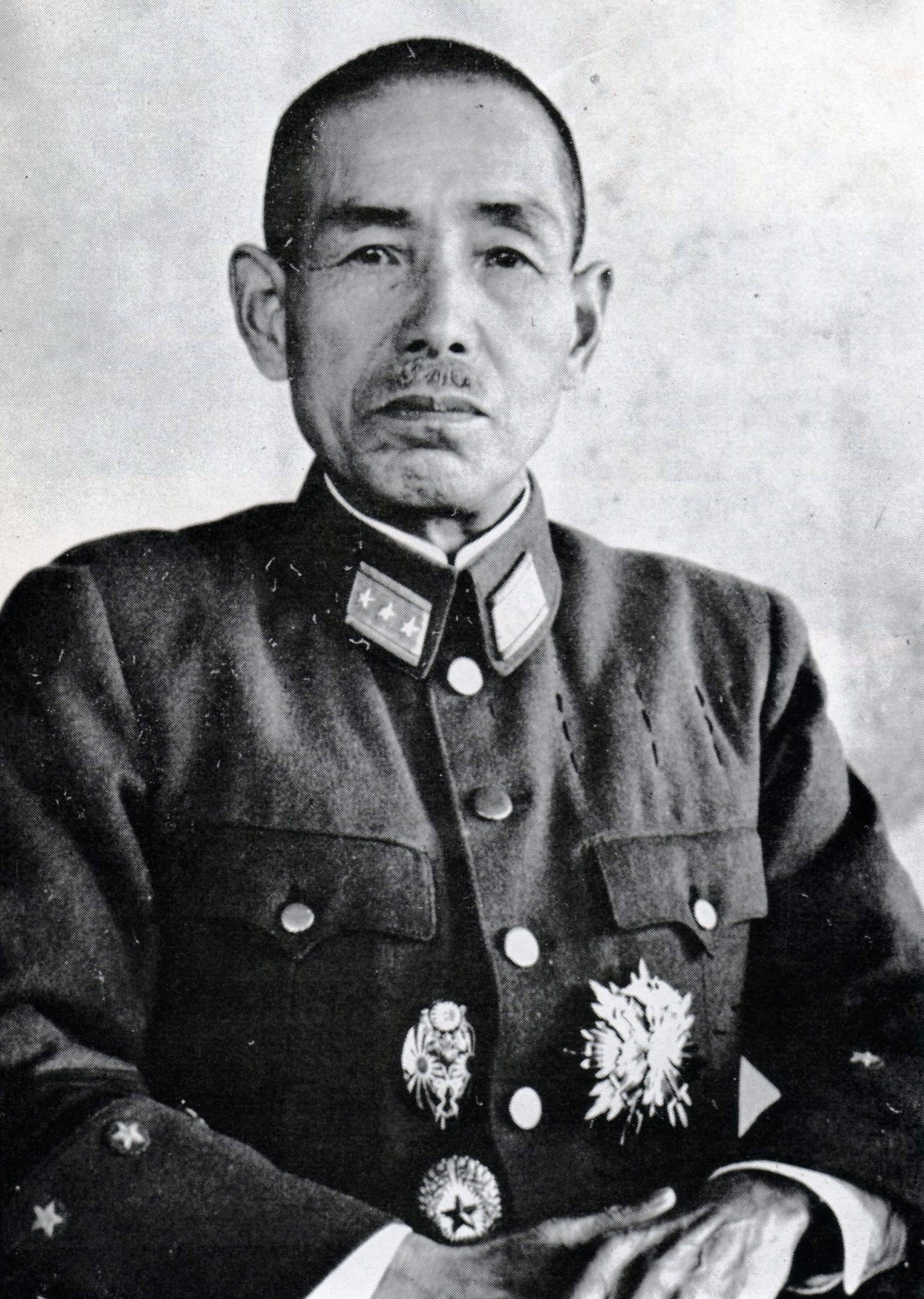
Field Marshal Shunroku Hata

Second General Army
Field Marshal Shunroku Hata (Note: Sentenced to life imprisonment for war crimes in 1948 but paroled in 1955)

Sixteenth Area Army
Lieut. General Yokoyama Isamu (600,000 men)

Northern Kyūshū — 56th Army
Lieut. General Ichiro Shichida (365,000)

145th Division
312th Division
351st Division
124th Independent Mixed Brigade
57th Division (20,000 men)
4th Tank Brigade

Southeastern Kyūshū — 57th Army
Lieut. General Nishihara Kanji (150,000 men)

Tanegashima—109th Independent Mixed Brigade (5,900 men)
Miyazaki—154th Division, 156th Division, 212th Division (55,000 men)
Ariake—86th Division, 98th Independent Mixed Brigade, 1 regiment, 3 infantry battalions (29,000 men)
25th Division, 5th Tank Brigade, 6th Tank Brigade

Southwestern Kyūshū — 40th Army
Lieut. General Nakazawa Mitsuo (85,000 men)

303rd Division (12,000 men) (Sendai)
206th Division (Fukiage)
146th Division, 125th Independent Mixed Brigade (S. Satsuma Peninsula)
77th Division 1 tank regiment

216th Division 4 brigades

==== Air forces ====
Air General Army
General Masakazu Kawabe

Sixth Air Army — Kyūshū

5,000 aircraft assigned as kamikazes, 5,000 aircraft available for kamikaze service, 7,000 aircraft in need of repair

Naval forces

Admiral Soemu Toyoda

100 Koryu-class midget submarines, 250 Kairyu-class midget submarines, 1,000 Kaiten manned torpedoes, 800 Shinyo suicide boats

== Order of Battle for Coronet ==
=== Allied ===
==== Ground forces ====
Ground force commanders
for Operation Coronet

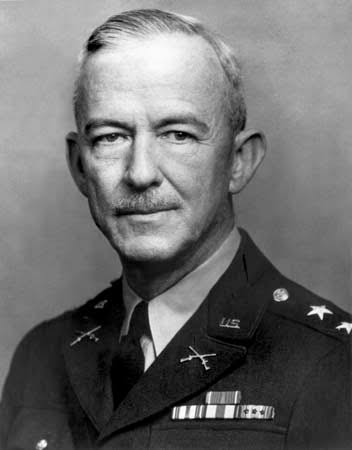
Gen. Courtney H. Hodges as a major general

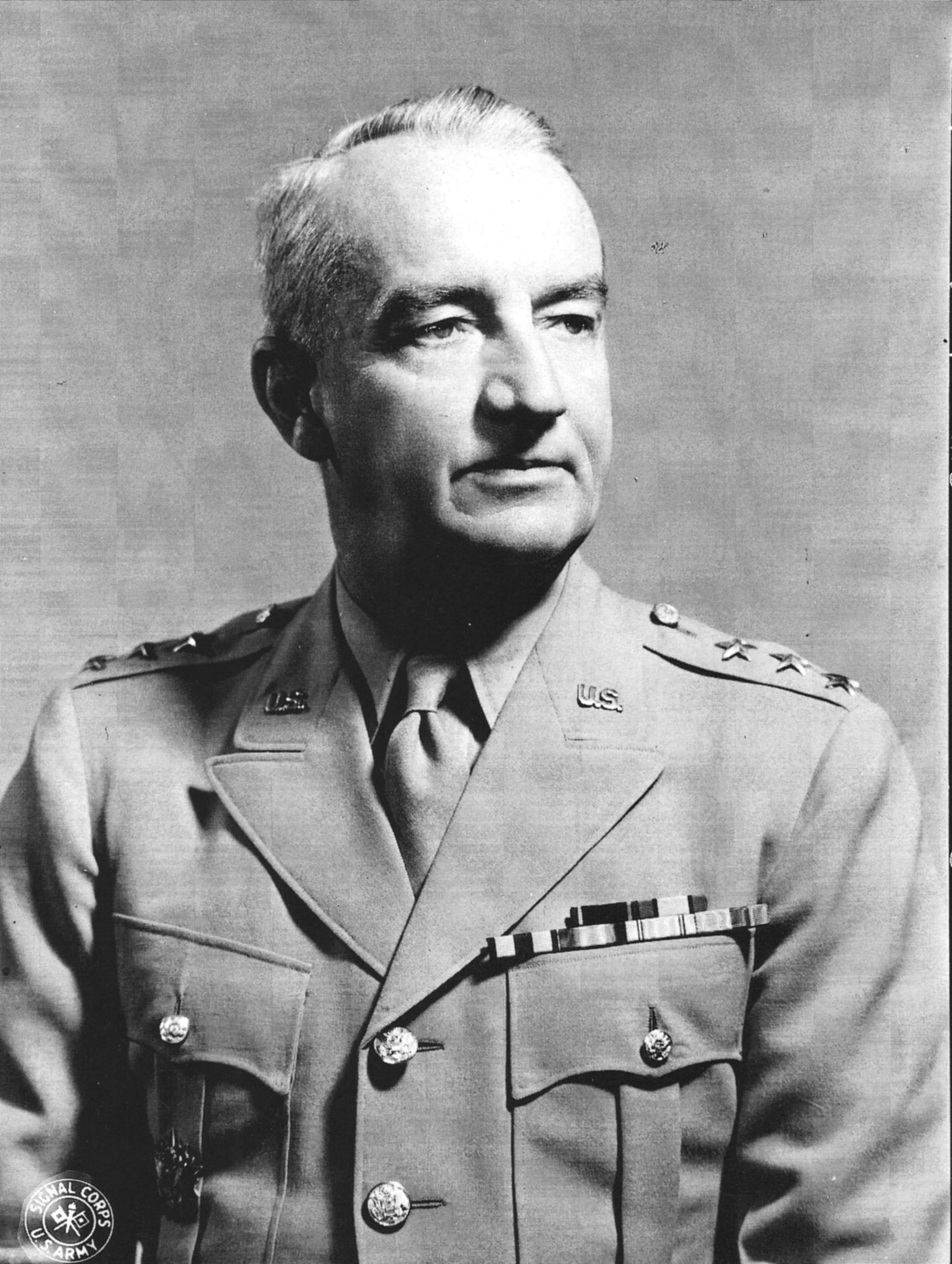
Lt. Gen. Robert L. Eichelberger

U.S. First Army
General Courtney H. Hodges (Note: Commanded First Army during Battle of the Bulge)

III Amphibious Corps

1st Marine Division (Guadalcanal, Peleliu, Okinawa)
2nd Marine Division (Tarawa, Saipan, Okinawa)
6th Marine Division (Okinawa)

XXIV Corps

7th Infantry Division
27th Infantry Division
96th Infantry Division

U.S. Eighth Army
Lieut. General Robert L. Eichelberger

X Corps

24th Infantry Division
31st Infantry Division
37th Infantry Division

XIV Corps

6th Infantry Division
32nd Infantry Division
38th Infantry Division

XIII Corps (Reserve afloat)

13th Armored Division
20th Armored Division

United States Army Forces Pacific reserve

97th Infantry Division

Thirty days after the initial assault, each army would be reinforced by a corps of 3 divisions. Five days later an airborne division and a United States Army Forces Pacific Reserve Corps of 3 divisions would be made available. Strategic reserve for the entire operation would consist of a corps of 3 divisions located in the Philippines and divisions from the United States to permit reinforcement at the rate of 4 divisions per month.

==== Unsourced listing of the aforementioned reinforcements ====
For the U.S. First Army

Unnamed follow-on corps

5th Infantry Division
44th Infantry Division
86th Infantry Division

For the U.S. Eighth Army

Unnamed follow-on corps

4th Infantry Division
8th Infantry Division
87th Infantry Division

United States Army Forces Pacific reserve
U.S. Tenth Army

General Joseph Stilwell
11th Airborne Division
Unnamed follow-on corps

2nd Infantry Division
28th Infantry Division
35th Infantry Division

Strategic reserve

91st Infantry Division
95th Infantry Division
104th Infantry Division

British Commonwealth Ground Forces

Commonwealth Corps (Lt. Gen. Charles Keightley)

3rd Infantry Division (United Kingdom)
6th Infantry Division (Canada)
10th Infantry Division (Australia)

=== Japan ===
Ground force commanders
for the defense of Honshu

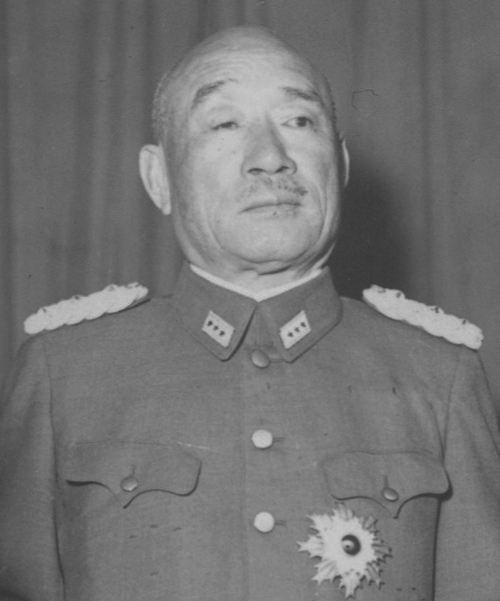
Field Marshal Hajime Sugiyama

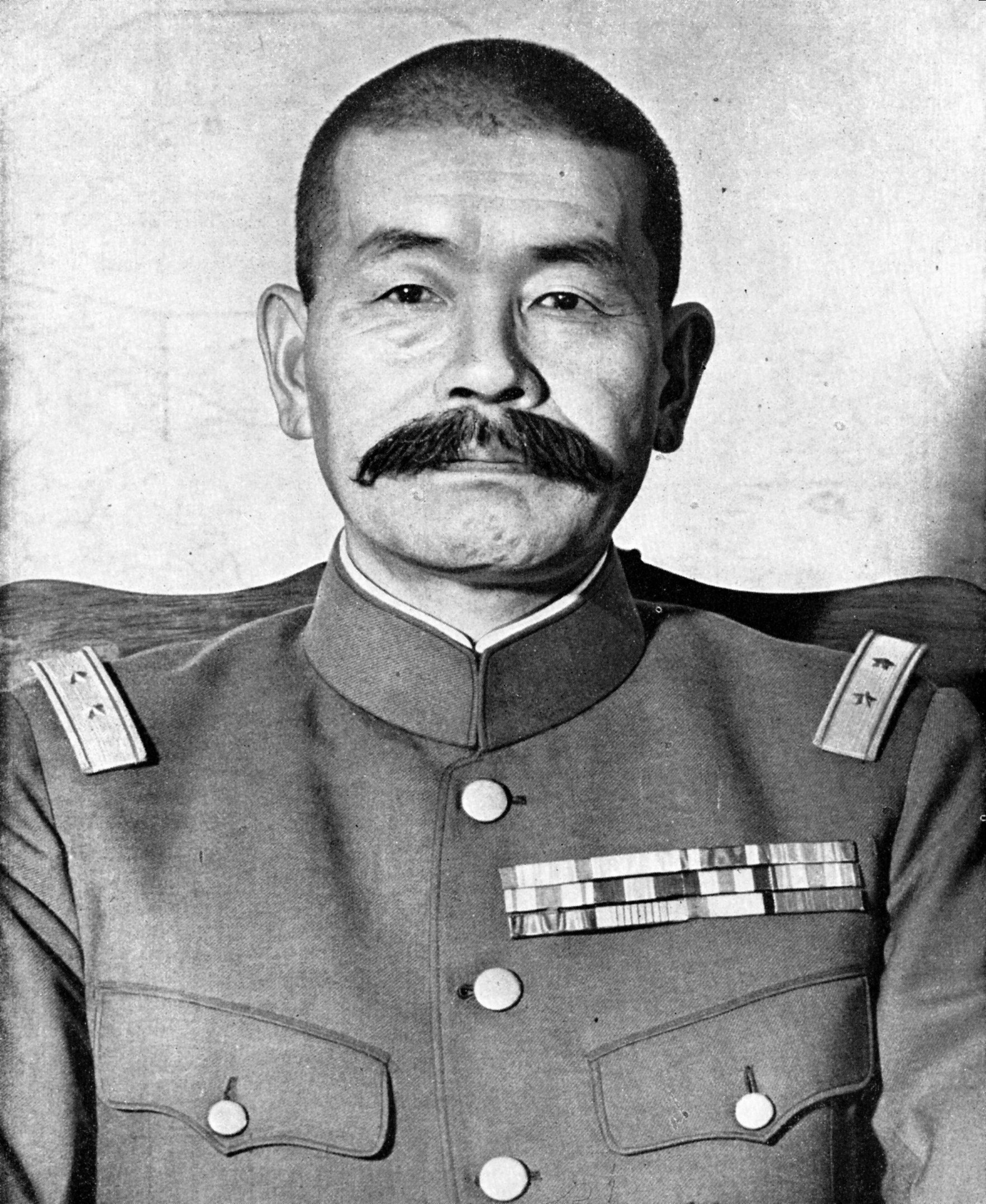
Gen. Shizuichi Tanaka

All Japanese formations on Honshu were badly understrength and lacking in equipment. The American First Army's landings would likely have been opposed by the Japanese 52nd Army and the Eighth Army's landings by the Japanese 53rd Army.

First General Army
Field Marshal Hajime Sugiyama (Note: Committed suicide by gunshot following Japan's surrender)

Twelfth Area Army
General Shizuichi Tanaka (Note: Committed suicide by gunshot following Japan's surrender)

36th Army – Urawa, Saitama

81st Division
93rd Division
201st Division
202nd Division
206th Division
214th Division
1st Tank Division
4th Tank Division

51st Army – Tsuchiura, Ibaraki

44th Division – Ogawa
151st Division – Mito
221st Division – Kashima
115th Independent Mixed Brigade – Shibasaki
116th Independent Mixed Brigade – Hokota
7th Independent Armored Brigade – Ogawa

52nd Army – Sakura, Chiba

3rd Imperial Guards Division – Naruto
147th Division – Mobara
152nd Division – Choshi
234th Division – Sōsa
3rd Independent Armored Brigade
8th Artillery Headquarters

53rd Army – Isehara, Kanagawa

84th Division – Odarawa
140th Division – Kamakura
316th Division – Isehara
117th Independent Mixed Brigade – Numazu
2nd Independent Armored Brigade – Tsudanuma
11th Artillery Headquarters – Hiratsuka

Tokyo Bay Garrison – Choshi, Chiba
321st Division – Tokyoa
