= 209th Division (Imperial Japanese Army) =

- 第209師団
- Active: 1945–1945
- Country: Empire of Japan
- Allegiance: 36th army?
- Branch: Imperial Japanese Army
- Type: Infantry
- Size: 20000
- Garrison/HQ: Kanazawa
- Nickname: Kaetsu division
- Engagements: none

The 209th Division (第209師団, Dai-nihyakukyū Shidan) was an infantry division of the Imperial Japanese Army. Its call sign was the Kaetsu Division (加越 兵団, Kaetsu Heidan), after location in now Komatsu. It was formed on 2 April 1945 in Kanazawa as a triangular division. It was one of a batch of eight divisions composed of the 201st, 202nd, 205th, 206th, 209th, 212th, 214th and 216th Divisions created as part of the reaction to the Battle of Okinawa.

== History ==
On 19 June 1945, the 209th Division organization and deployment was complete. The 513th Infantry Regiment was in Kanazawa, the 514th in Toyama, and the 515th Infantry Regiment was sent to Gifu . Some of its other units were deployed at Sabae, Fukui. It did not see any combat by the time of the surrender of Japan on 15 August 1945.

== See also ==
- List of Japanese Infantry Divisions

== Notes and references ==
- This article incorporates material from Japanese Wikipedia page 第209師団 (日本軍), accessed 20 July 2016
- Madej, W. Victor, Japanese Armed Forces Order of Battle, 1937–1945 [2 vols], Allentown, PA: 1981.
