= 205th Division (Imperial Japanese Army) =

- 第205師団
- Active: 1945–1945
- Country: Empire of Japan
- Allegiance: 55th army
- Branch: Imperial Japanese Army
- Type: Infantry
- Garrison/HQ: Kōchi
- Nickname: Aki division
- Engagements: none

Commanders
- Notable commanders: Tadashi Katakura

The 205th Division (第205師団, Dai-nihyakugo Shidan) was an infantry division of the Imperial Japanese Army. Its call sign was the Aki Division (安芸 兵団, Aki Heidan), after the Aki District, Hiroshima. It was formed on 2 April 1945 in Hiroshima as a triangular division. It was one of a batch of eight divisions comprising the 201st, 202nd, 205th, 206th, 209th, 212th, 214th and 216th Divisions that were created as part of the Japanese reaction to the Battle of Okinawa.

== Action ==
In June 1945, the 205th Division was deployed at Kōchi. It did not see any combat, and was disbanded after the surrender of Japan on 15 August 1945.

== See also ==
- List of Japanese Infantry Divisions
Japanese infantry and armored units in Home Islands, 15 August 1945

== Notes and references ==
- This article incorporates material from Japanese Wikipedia page 第205師団 (日本軍), accessed 14 July 2016
- Madej, W. Victor, Japanese Armed Forces Order of Battle, 1937–1945 [2 vols], Allentown, PA: 1981.
