= 152nd Division (Imperial Japanese Army) =

Infantry division of the Imperial Japanese Army

- 第152師団
- Active: 1945–1945
- Country: Empire of Japan
- Allegiance: 52nd army
- Branch: Imperial Japanese Army
- Type: Infantry
- Size: 10000
- Garrison/HQ: Chōshi
- Nickname: Kanazawa protection division
- Engagements: none

The 152nd Division (第152師団, Dai-hyakugojūni Shidan) was an infantry division of the Imperial Japanese Army. Its call sign was the Kanazawa Protection Division (護沢兵団, Gozawa Heidan). It was formed 28 February 1945 in Kanazawa as a square division. It was a part of the 16 simultaneously created divisions batch numbering from 140th to 160th.

== Action ==
The 152nd division was initially assigned to 11th area army. In April 1945 it was reassigned to 52nd army and sent from Kanazawa to Chōshi in Kantō region, where it performed a coastal defense duties until surrender of Japan 15 August 1945 without seeing an actual combat. The 437th infantry regiment was garrisoning Chōshi, the 440th - west Chōshi, 438th - Asahi, Chiba (building defenses on south-western bank of Tone River), and 439th infantry regiment - Omigawa, Chiba.

== See also ==
- List of Japanese Infantry Divisions
Japanese infantry and armored units in Home Islands, 15 August 1945

== Notes and references ==
- This article incorporates material from Japanese Wikipedia page 第152師団 (日本軍), accessed 13 July 2016
- Madej, W. Victor, Japanese Armed Forces Order of Battle, 1937–1945 [2 vols], Allentown, PA: 1981.
