= 147th Division (Imperial Japanese Army) =

- 第147師団
- Active: 1945–1945
- Country: Empire of Japan
- Allegiance: 52nd army
- Branch: Imperial Japanese Army
- Type: Infantry
- Size: 8547
- Garrison/HQ: Mobara
- Nickname: North protection division
- Engagements: none

The 147th Division (第147師団, Dai-hyakuyonjūnana Shidan) was an infantry division of the Imperial Japanese Army. Its call sign was the Hokkaido Protection Division (護北兵団, Koho Heidan). It was formed 28 February 1945 in Asahikawa as a square division. It was a part of the 16 simultaneously created divisions batch numbering from 140th to 160th.

== Action ==
Initially the 147th division has stayed on Tomakomai positions vacated by 77th Division. After formation of the 147th division was complete, it was assigned to newly created 52nd army and sent to Mobara in Chiba Prefecture.

The 147th division was tasked with the coastal defense. The division did not see any combat until surrender of Japan 15 August 1945 except for air raids.

Shortage of equipment during 147th division formation was severe. Only one of seven men had rifles, with the balance equipped with bamboo spears, and bayonets were forged from the rails of the Asahikawa Electric Railway.

Teiichi Tamura, the commander of the 426th infantry regiment, was executed according to the verdict of the controversial International Military Tribunal for the Far East for his role in the killing of the downed Allied pilot in the course of the Ichinomiya-machi incident.

== See also ==
- List of Japanese Infantry Divisions
Japanese infantry and armored units in Home Islands, 15 August 1945

== Notes and references ==
- This article incorporates material from Japanese Wikipedia page 第147師団 (日本軍), accessed 13 July 2016
- Madej, W. Victor, Japanese Armed Forces Order of Battle, 1937–1945 [2 vols], Allentown, PA: 1981.
