= 202nd Division (Imperial Japanese Army) =

- 第202師団
- Active: 1945–1945
- Country: Empire of Japan
- Allegiance: 36th army
- Branch: Imperial Japanese Army
- Type: Infantry
- Garrison/HQ: Takasaki, Gunma
- Nickname: Aoba division
- Engagements: none

Commanders
- Notable commanders: Tadashi Katakura

The 202nd Division (第202師団, Dai-nihyakini Shidan) was an infantry division of the Imperial Japanese Army. Its call sign was the Aoba Division (青葉 兵団, Aoba Heidan), after the Aoba Castle. It was formed 2 April 1945 in Sendai as a triangular division. It was one of the batch of eight divisions comprising 201st, 202nd, 205th, 206th, 209th, 212th, 214th and 216th divisions created as part of the Japanese reaction on the Battle of Okinawa.

== Action ==
The 202nd division was assigned as the mobile reserve of the Kantō region. The 504th infantry regiment was garrisoning Isesaki, 505th - Annaka, and 506th infantry regiment - Honjō. Other sub-units were deployed at Numata. The 202nd division did not see any combat.

== See also ==
- List of Japanese Infantry Divisions
Japanese infantry and armored units in Home Islands, 15 August 1945

== Notes and references ==
- This article incorporates material from Japanese Wikipedia page 第202師団 (日本軍), accessed 14 July 2016
- Madej, W. Victor, Japanese Armed Forces Order of Battle, 1937–1945 [2 vols], Allentown, PA: 1981.
