= 93rd Division (Imperial Japanese Army) =

- 第93師団
- Active: 1944 - 1945
- Country: Empire of Japan
- Allegiance: 36th army
- Branch: Imperial Japanese Army
- Type: Infantry
- Garrison/HQ: Kanazawa
- Nickname: Resolve division
- Engagements: none

The 93rd Division (第93師団, Dai-kyūjūsan Shidan) was an infantry division in the Imperial Japanese Army. Its call sign was the Resolve Division (決兵団, Ketsu Heidan). It was created 6 July 1944 in Kanazawa. The nucleus for the formation was the training camps of the 52nd division. It was a triangular division.

== Action ==
The 93rd division was assigned to 36th army upon formation. Initial location of the division headquarters was Gotemba, Shizuoka, although 203rd infantry regiment was placed in northern Chiba Prefecture while 204th infantry regiment was placed in Matsumoto, Nagano.

Later entire division was concentrated in Chiba Prefecture, where it spent the time until surrender of Japan 15 August 1945 building a fortifications without engaging in actual combat.

Japanese infantry and armored units in Home Islands, 15 August 1945

== References and further reading ==
- List of Japanese Infantry Divisions
- Madej, W. Victor. Japanese Armed Forces Order of Battle, 1937-1945 [2 vols] Allentown, PA: 1981

This article incorporates material from the article 第93師団 (日本軍) in the Japanese Wikipedia, retrieved on 24 June 2016.
