= 145th Division (Imperial Japanese Army) =

- 第145師団
- Active: 1945–1945
- Country: Empire of Japan
- Allegiance: 56th army
- Branch: Imperial Japanese Army
- Type: Infantry
- Size: 10000
- Garrison/HQ: Ashiya
- Nickname: Kitakyushu protection division
- Engagements: none

The 145th Division (第145師団, Dai-hyakuyonjūgo Shidan) was an infantry division of the Imperial Japanese Army. Its call sign was the Kitakyushu Protection Division (護州兵団, Koshu Heidan). It was formed 28 February 1945 in Hiroshima as a square division. It was a part of the 16 simultaneously created divisions batch numbering from 140th to 160th.

== Action ==
Initially, the 145th division was assigned to the 16th area army. Later it was reassigned to 56th army and sent to Ashiya, Fukuoka. 419th infantry regiment was defending Wakamatsu-ku, Kitakyūshū area.

The 145th division was tasked with the coastal defense. The division did not see any combat until surrender of Japan 15 August 1945.

== See also ==
- List of Japanese Infantry Divisions
Japanese infantry and armored units in Home Islands, 15 August 1945

== Notes and references ==
- This article incorporates material from Japanese Wikipedia page 第145師団 (日本軍), accessed 13 July 2016
- Madej, W. Victor, Japanese Armed Forces Order of Battle, 1937–1945 [2 vols], Allentown, PA: 1981.
