= 214th Division (Imperial Japanese Army) =

- 第214師団
- Active: 1945–1945
- Country: Empire of Japan
- Allegiance: 36th army
- Branch: Imperial Japanese Army
- Type: Infantry
- Size: 20000
- Garrison/HQ: Nasushiobara
- Nickname: Hitachi division
- Engagements: none

The 214th Division (第214師団, Dai-nihyakujūyon Shidan) was an infantry division of the Imperial Japanese Army. Its call sign was the Hitachi division (常盤兵団, Hitachi Heidan), after Hitachi Province. It was formed on 2 April 1945 in Utsunomiya as a triangular division. It was one of a batch of eight divisions composed of the 201st, 202nd, 205th, 206th, 209th, 212th, 214th and 216th Divisions created as part of the reaction to the Battle of Okinawa.

== History ==
On 19 June 1945, the 214th Division organization and deployment was complete. The 519th Infantry Regiment was in Utsunomiya, 520th - in Yaita, and 521st infantry regiment - in Setagaya. Other smaller sub-units were stationed at Nasushiobara. The 214th division was assigned to the army mobile reserve and did not see any combat by the time of the surrender of Japan on 15 August 1945.

== See also ==
- List of Japanese Infantry Divisions
Japanese infantry and armored units in Home Islands, 15 August 1945

== Notes and references ==
- This article incorporates material from Japanese Wikipedia page 第214師団 (日本軍), accessed 20 July 2016
- Madej, W. Victor, Japanese Armed Forces Order of Battle, 1937–1945 [2 vols], Allentown, PA: 1981.
