= 201st Division (Imperial Japanese Army) =

- 第201師団
- Active: 1945–1945
- Country: Empire of Japan
- Allegiance: 36th army
- Branch: Imperial Japanese Army
- Type: Infantry
- Garrison/HQ: Kunitachi
- Nickname: Musashi division
- Engagements: none

The 201st Division (第201師団, Dai-nihyakuichi Shidan) was an infantry division of the Imperial Japanese Army. Its call sign was the Musashi Division (武蔵兵団, Musashi Heidan). It was formed 2 April 1945 in Tokyo as a triangular division. It was one of the batch of eight divisions comprising 201st, 202nd, 205th, 206th, 209th, 212th, 214th and 216th divisions created as part of the Japanese reaction on the Battle of Okinawa.

== Action ==
The 201st division was assigned to the second line of defenses of Kantō region deeper inland. The 501st infantry regiment was garrisoning Zama, 502nd and 503rd infantry regiments - Musashimurayama. Other sub-units were deployed at Gotemba. The 201st division did not see any combat.

== See also ==
- List of Japanese Infantry Divisions
Japanese infantry and armored units in Home Islands, 15 August 1945

== Notes and references ==
- This article incorporates material from Japanese Wikipedia page 第201師団 (日本軍), accessed 14 July 2016
- Madej, W. Victor, Japanese Armed Forces Order of Battle, 1937–1945 [2 vols], Allentown, PA: 1981.
