= 77th Division (Imperial Japanese Army) =

- 第77師団
- Active: 1944–1945
- Country: Empire of Japan
- Allegiance: 5th area army
- Branch: Imperial Japanese Army
- Type: Infantry
- Role: Coastal defense
- Nickname(s): Ripe Division
- Engagements: none

Commanders
- Notable commanders: Nonoyama Hidemi (野々山秀美)

The 77th Division (第77師団, Dai-nanajūnana Shidan) was an infantry division in the Imperial Japanese Army. Its call sign was the Ripe Division (稔兵団, Nen Heidan).It was created in March 1944 in Asahikawa, Hokkaido to replace 7th division and disbanded in September 1945 in Kajiki, Kagoshima. It was a triangular division. The men of the division were drafted through 7th military district, located in Hokkaido.

== Action ==
From 8 October 1945, the 77th division was subordinated to 5th area army and set in charge of the fortifications from west of Daisetsuzan Volcanic Group to Yūfutsu District, Hokkaido on the southern coast of Hokkaido. 11 February 1945, it was moved to reserve in Asahikawa, with newly formed 147th division taking over the Tomakomai fortifications.

In May 1945, the division was subordinated to the 16th area army and sent to Satsumasendai, Kagoshima as part of the general buildup of Japanese forces on Kyushu in the wake of defeat in battle of Okinawa. Later the division was transferred to Kajiki, Kagoshima, where it meet the surrender of Japan 15 August 1945.

Japanese infantry and armored units in Home Islands, 15 August 1945

== See also ==
- List of Japanese Infantry Divisions
- Independent Mixed Brigades (Imperial Japanese Army)

== Notes and references ==
This article incorporates material from the article 第77師団 (日本軍) in the Japanese Wikipedia, retrieved on 14 January 2016.

- Madej, W. Victor. Japanese Armed Forces Order of Battle, 1937-1945 [2 vols] Allentown, PA: 1981
- Hata Ikuhiko, ed. "日本陸海軍総合事典 第2版" (Comprehensive Encyclopedia of the Imperial Japanese Navy and Army, Second Edition), Tōkyō Daigaku Shuppankai, 2005.
- Toyama Misao and Morimatsu Toshio, eds. "帝国陸軍編制総覧" (Comprehensive Sourcebook on Imperial Army Units), Fuyōshobō, 1987.
- 『別冊歴史読本 戦記シリーズNo.32 太平洋戦争師団戦史』 (Special Edition of Rekishi Yomihon: War History Series No.32 – Battle History of Pacific War Divisions), Shin Jinbutsu Ōraisha, 1996.
