= 212th Division (Imperial Japanese Army) =

- 第212師団
- Active: 1945–1945
- Country: Empire of Japan
- Allegiance: 16th area army
- Branch: Imperial Japanese Army
- Type: Infantry
- Size: 20000
- Garrison/HQ: Tsuno
- Nickname: Kikuchi 32601
- Engagements: none

The 212th Division (第212師団, Dai-nihyakujūni Shidan) was an infantry division of the Imperial Japanese Army. Its call sign was the Kikuchi 32601 division (菊池32601兵団, Kikuchi 32601 Heidan), after Kikuchi, Kumamoto. It was formed on 2 April 1945 in Kurume as a triangular division. It was one of a batch of eight divisions composed of the 201st, 202nd, 205th, 206th, 209th, 212th, 214th and 216th Divisions created as part of the reaction to the Battle of Okinawa.

== History ==
On 11 June 1945, the 212th Division organization and deployment was complete. The 516th and 518th Infantry Regiments, together with service units, were in Tsuno, Miyazaki, while the 517th infantry regiment was in Kurume It did not see any combat by the time of the surrender of Japan on 15 August 1945.

== See also ==
- List of Japanese Infantry Divisions
Japanese infantry and armored units in Home Islands, 15 August 1945

== Notes and references ==
- This article incorporates material from Japanese Wikipedia page 第212師団 (日本軍), accessed 20 July 2016
- Madej, W. Victor, Japanese Armed Forces Order of Battle, 1937–1945 [2 vols], Allentown, PA: 1981.
