= Tadashi Katakura =

Japanese general

- 片倉 衷
- Born: 18 May 1898; Fukushima Prefecture, Japan
- Died: 23 July 1991 (aged 93)
- Military career
- Allegiance: Empire of Japan
- Branch: Imperial Japanese Army
- Rank: Lieutenant General
- Commands: 202nd Division
- Conflicts: 26 February Incident (WIA); Second Sino-Japanese War; World War II

Tadashi Katakura (片倉 衷, Katakura Tadashi; 18 May 1898 – 23 July 1991) was a general in the Imperial Japanese Army during the Second Sino-Japanese War and World War II.

Katakura was a prominent member of the Tōsei-ha faction and as a consequence was a target of the Kōdō-ha faction in the 26 February Incident in 1936, and indeed sustained a head wound at the time.

He was on the staff of the Burma Area Army. He was chief of staff of the Thirty-third Army from 8 April 1944 to 19 June 1944. He was commander of the 202nd Division.

== Later life ==
Katakura resigned in December 1945.

In 1989 he appeared as himself (Kwantung Army Officer, 1931) in The Road to War, a television documentary miniseries, narrated by Charles Wheeler.

Katakura died in 1991.
