= 206th Division (Imperial Japanese Army) =

- 第206師団
- Active: 1945–1945
- Country: Empire of Japan
- Allegiance: 16th area army
- Branch: Imperial Japanese Army
- Type: Infantry
- Size: 20000
- Garrison/HQ: Fukiage, Kagoshima
- Nickname: Aso division
- Engagements: none

The 206th Division (第206師団, Dai-nihyakuroku Shidan) was an infantry division of the Imperial Japanese Army. Its call sign was the Aso Division (阿蘇 兵団, Aso Heidan), after Mount Aso. It was formed on 2 April 1945 in Kumamoto as a triangular division. It was one of a batch of eight divisions composed of the 201st, 202nd, 205th, 206th, 209th, 212th, 214th and 216th Divisions created as part of the reaction to the Battle of Okinawa.

== History ==
On 11 June 1945, the 206th Division was deployed in western Kagoshima Prefecture. The 510th Infantry Regiment was in Hioki, the 511th in Fukiage-cho Tajiri 31.529°N 130.361°E, and the 512th Infantry Regiment was sent to Higashiichiki-Chō Yuda 31.671°N 130.335°E. Some of its other units were deployed at Fukiage. It did not see any combat by the time of the surrender of Japan on 15 August 1945.

== See also ==
- List of Japanese Infantry Divisions
Japanese infantry and armored units in Home Islands, 15 August 1945

== Notes and references ==
- This article incorporates material from Japanese Wikipedia page 第206師団 (日本軍), accessed 14 July 2016
- Madej, W. Victor, Japanese Armed Forces Order of Battle, 1937–1945 [2 vols], Allentown, PA: 1981.
