= 216th Division (Imperial Japanese Army) =

- 第216師団
- Active: 1945–1945
- Country: Empire of Japan
- Allegiance: 16th area army
- Branch: Imperial Japanese Army
- Type: Infantry
- Size: 20000
- Garrison/HQ: Uto, Kumamoto
- Nickname: Hiei 10251
- Engagements: none

The 216th Division (第216師団, Dai-nihyakujūroku Shidan) was an infantry division of the Imperial Japanese Army. Its call sign was the Hiei 10251 division (比叡 10251 兵団, Hiei 10251 Heidan), after Mount Hiei. It was formed on 2 April 1945 in Kyoto as a triangular division. It was one of a batch of eight divisions composed of the 201st, 202nd, 205th, 206th, 209th, 212th, 214th and 216th divisions created as part of the reaction to the Battle of Okinawa.

== Action ==
On 11 June 1945, the 216th Division's organization and deployment was complete. The three infantry regiments were deployed in Uto, Kumamoto, while other small sub-units were at Takasaki Town (modern Hōtaku District, Kumamoto) It did not see any combat by the time of the surrender of Japan on 15 August 1945.

== See also ==
- List of Japanese Infantry Divisions
Japanese infantry and armored units in Home Islands, 15 August 1945

== Notes and references ==
- This article incorporates material from Japanese Wikipedia page 第216師団 (日本軍), accessed 20 July 2016
- Madej, W. Victor, Japanese Armed Forces Order of Battle, 1937–1945 [2 vols], Allentown, PA: 1981.
