= Fifty-Sixth Army (Japan) =

Japanese Fifty-Sixth Army
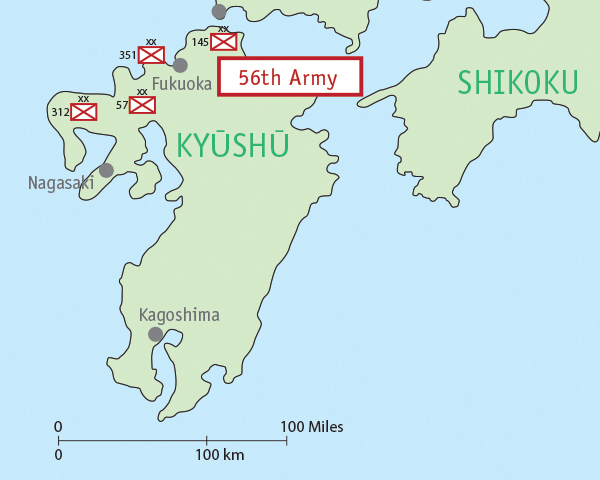
- Active: April 21, 1945 – August 15, 1945
- Country: Empire of Japan
- Branch: Imperial Japanese Army
- Type: Infantry
- Role: Corps
- Engagements: Operation Downfall

The Japanese 56th Army (第56軍, Dai-gojyuroku gun) was an army of the Imperial Japanese Army during the final days of World War II.

== History ==
The Japanese 56th Army was formed on April 21, 1945, under the Japanese 16th Area Army as part of the last desperate defense effort by the Empire of Japan to deter possible landings of Allied forces in northern Kyūshū during Operation Downfall. The Japanese 56th Army was based in Iizuka city, Fukuoka Prefecture. It consisted mostly of poorly trained reservists, conscripted students and Volunteer Fighting Corps home guard militia. It was demobilized at the surrender of Japan on August 15, 1945, without having seen combat.

== List of Commanders ==
	Name	From	To
Commanding officer	Lieutenant General Ichiro Shichida	15 April 1945	15 August 1945
Chief of Staff	Major General Uichi Naiya	15 April 1945	29 August 1945
