= Fifty-Second Army (Japan) =

Japanese Fifty-Second Army
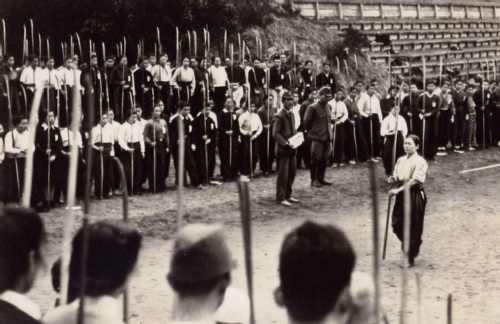
- Student militia at Kujukurihama, Chiba
- Active: April 7, 1945 – August 15, 1945
- Country: Empire of Japan
- Branch: Imperial Japanese Army
- Type: Infantry
- Role: Corps
- Garrison/HQ: Sakura, Chiba
- Nickname(s): Shō (捷, Victory)
- Engagements: Operation Downfall

The Japanese 52nd Army (第52軍, Dai-gojyūni gun) was an army of the Imperial Japanese Army during the final days of World War II.

== History ==
The Japanese 52nd Army was formed on April 7, 1945, under the Japanese 12th Area Army as part of the last desperate defense effort by the Empire of Japan to deter possible landings of Allied forces in central Honshū during Operation Downfall. The Japanese 52nd Army was based in Sakura, Chiba Prefecture and was thus intended to guard the closest beachhead to Tokyo and the Kantō region along the Bōsō Peninsula. It consisted mostly of poorly trained reservists, conscripted students and Volunteer Fighting Corps home guard militia. It was demobilized at the surrender of Japan on August 15, 1945, without having seen combat.

== List of Commanders ==
	Name	From	To
Commanding officer	Lieutenant General Shigeta Tokumatsu	7 April 1945	15 August 1945
Chief of Staff	Major General Tamaki Onwa	6 April 1945	10 October 1945
