= Twelfth Area Army =

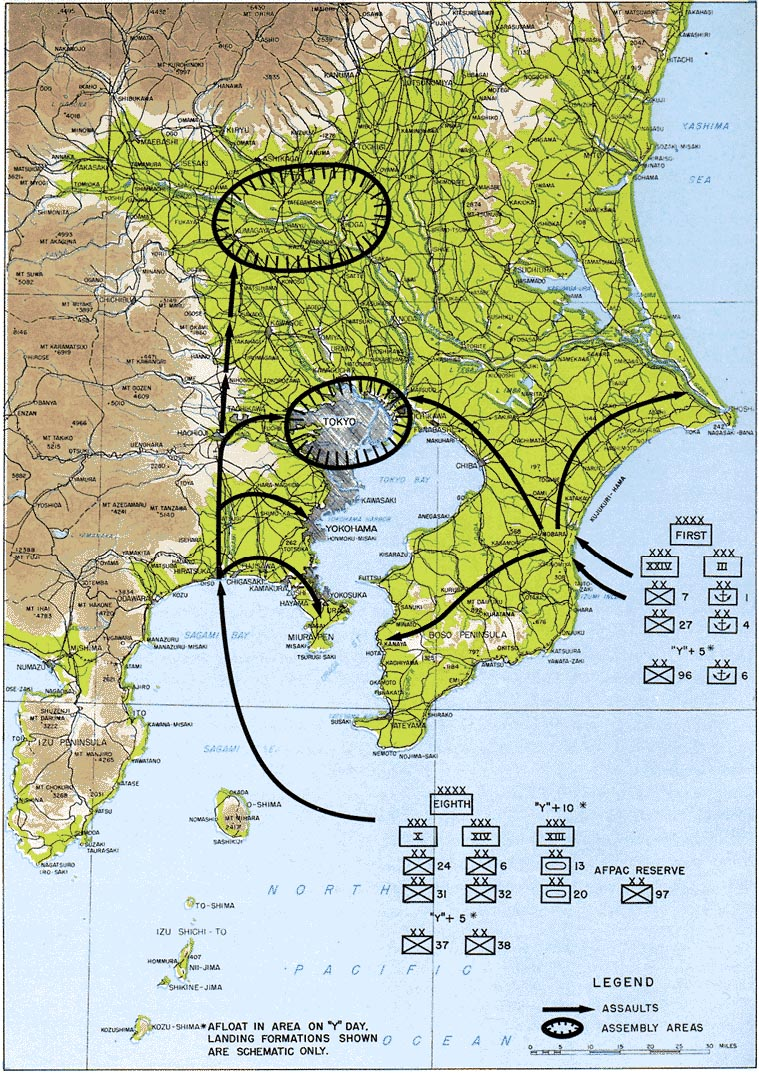
- Invasion Map for Tokyo region during Operation Downfall
- Active: February 1, 1945 - August 15, 1945
- Country: Japan
- Branch: Imperial Japanese Army
- Type: Infantry
- Role: Field Army
- Garrison/HQ: Tokyo
- Nickname: 幡 (hata = “banner”)
- Engagements: Operation Downfall

The Twelfth Area Army (第12方面軍, Dai-jūni hōmen gun) was a field army of the Imperial Japanese Army during World War II.

== History ==
The Japanese 12th Area Army was formed on February 2, 1945 under the First General Army as part of the last desperate defense effort by the Empire of Japan to deter possible landings of Allied forces in central Honshū during Operation Downfall (or Operation Ketsugō (決号作戦, Ketsugō sakusen) in Japanese terminology). The Japanese 12th Area Army was responsible for the Kantō region of Japan and was headquartered in Tokyo.

It consisted mostly of poorly trained reservists, conscripted students and home guard militia. In addition, the Japanese had organized the Volunteer Fighting Corps — which included all healthy men aged 15–60 and women 17–40 — to perform combat support, and ultimately combat jobs. Weapons, training, and uniforms were generally lacking: some men were armed with nothing better than muzzle-loading muskets, longbows, or bamboo spears; nevertheless, they were expected to make do with what they had.

The 12th Area Army was demobilized at the surrender of Japan on September 2, 1945 without having seen combat.

== List of Commanders ==
=== Commanding officer ===
	Name	From	To
1	General Keisuke Fujie	February 1, 1945	March 9, 1945
2	General Shizuichi Tanaka	March 9, 1945	August 24, 1945
3	General Kenji Doihara	August 25, 1945	September 2, 1945

=== Chief of Staff ===
	Name	From	To
1	Lieutenant General Eiichi Tatsumi	February 1, 1945	March 1, 1945
2	Major General Tatsuhiko Takashima	March 1, 1945	August 25, 1945
