= Operation Downfall =

Allied plan to invade mainland Japan, WWII

- Part of the Pacific War
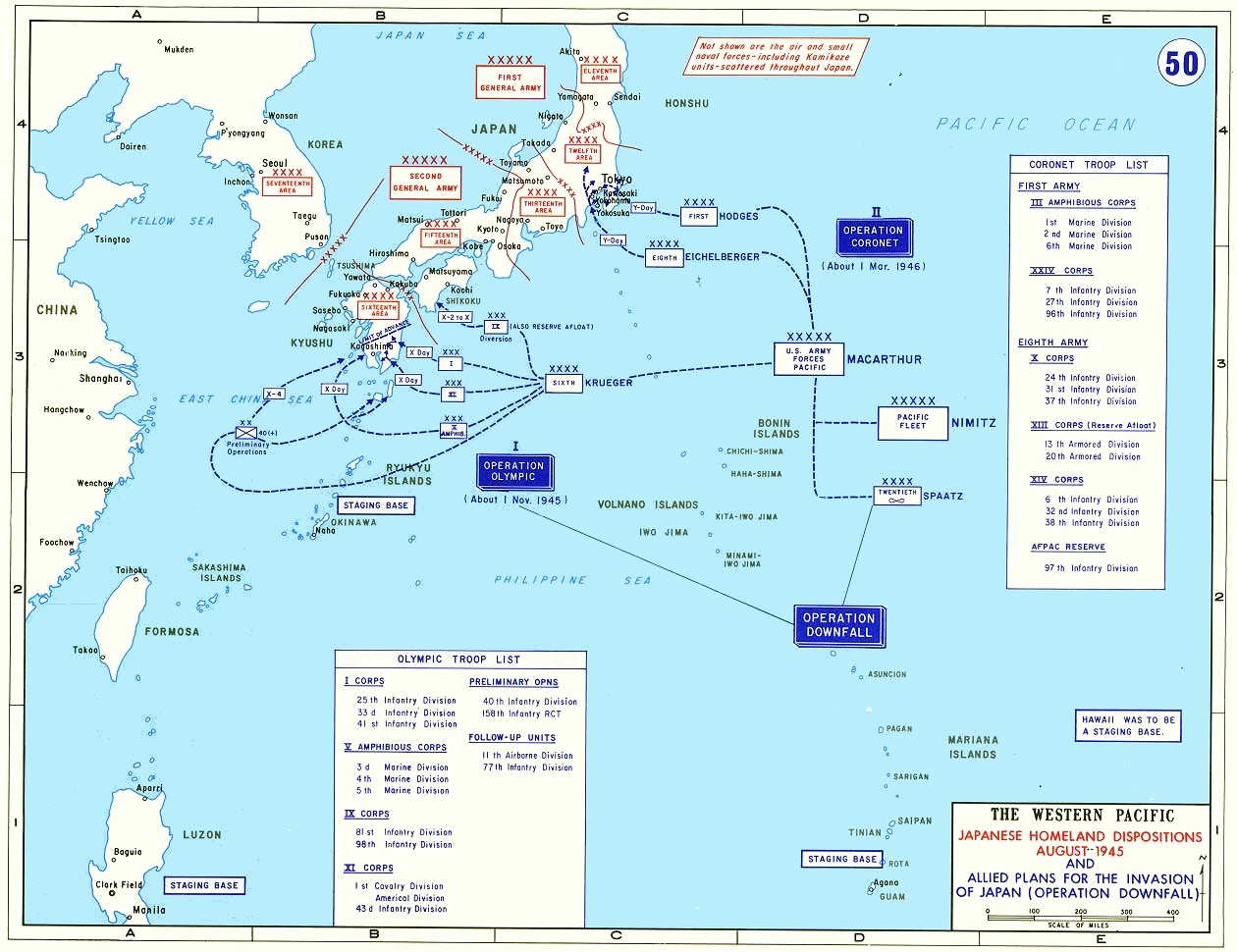
- Location: Mainland Japan
- Planned: Before August 1945
- Planned by: Chester W. Nimitz; Douglas MacArthur; Joint Chiefs of Staff
- Commanded by: Douglas MacArthur
- Objective: Defeat the Empire of Japan
- Executed by: See order of battle
- Outcome: Cancelled after the unconditional surrender of Japan on August 15, 1945
- Casualties: See estimated casualties

Operation Downfall was the proposed plan by United States and British Empire forces for the invasion of the Japanese home islands near the end of World War II. It was canceled when Japan surrendered following the atomic bombings of Hiroshima and Nagasaki and the Soviet declaration of war on Japan and invasion of Manchuria.

The operation had two parts: Operation Olympic and Operation Coronet. Set to begin in November 1945, Operation Olympic was intended to capture the southern third of the southernmost main Japanese island, Kyūshū, with the recently captured island of Okinawa to be used as a staging area. In Spring 1946 would come Operation Coronet, the planned invasion of the Kantō Plain, near Tokyo, on the main Japanese island of Honshu. Airbases on Kyūshū captured in Operation Olympic would allow land-based air support for Operation Coronet. If Downfall had taken place, it would have been the largest amphibious operation in history, surpassing D-Day.

Japan's geography made this invasion plan obvious to the Japanese as well; they were able to accurately predict the Allied invasion plans and thus adjust their defensive plan, Operation Ketsugō, accordingly. The Japanese planned an all-out defense of Kyūshū, with little left in reserve for any subsequent defense operations. Casualty predictions varied but were extremely high, from the low hundreds of thousands to over a million on the Allied side and into the millions for the Japanese.

== Planning ==
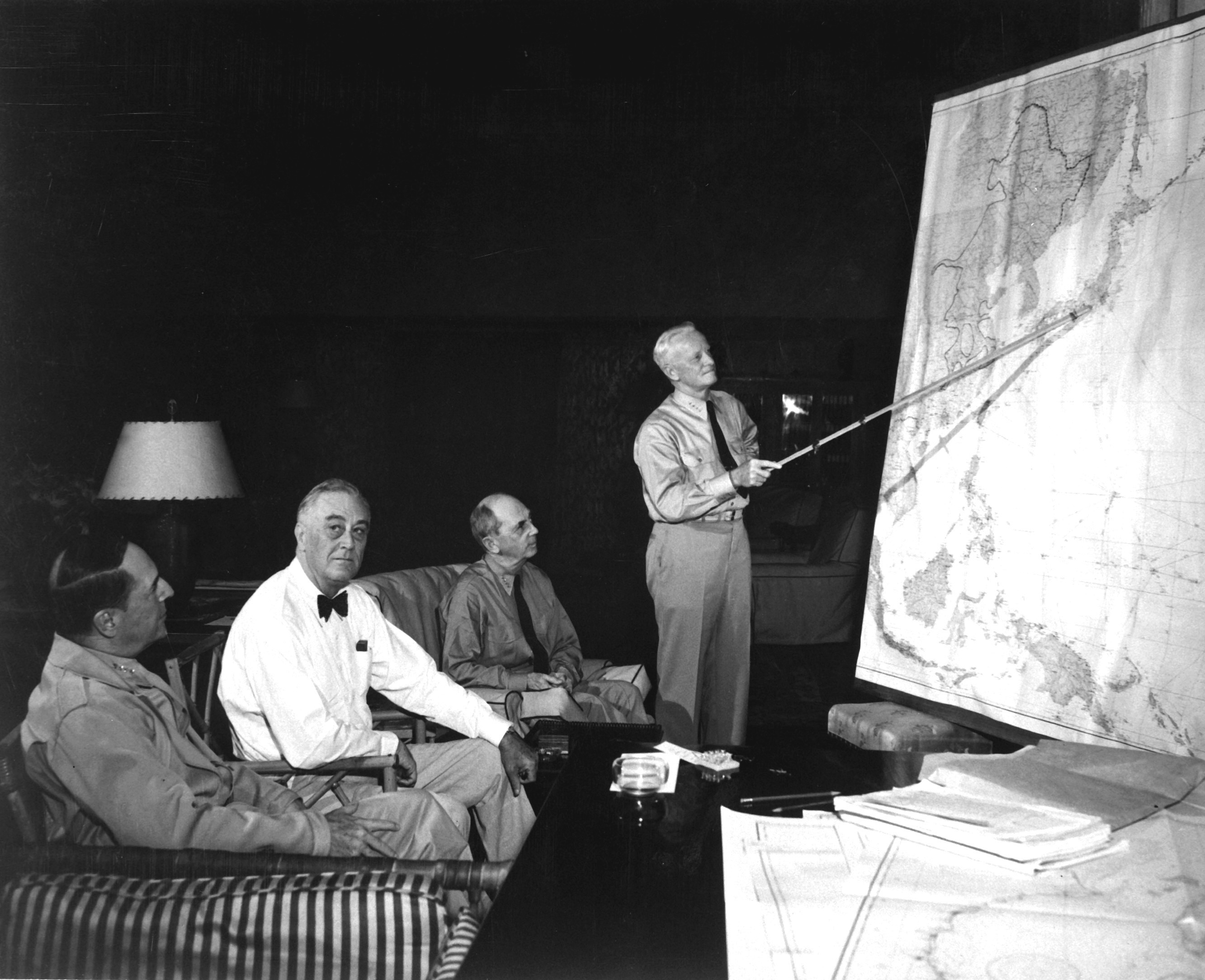
Nimitz, MacArthur and Leahy holding a conference with FDR.

Responsibility for the planning of Operation Downfall fell to American commanders Fleet Admiral Chester Nimitz, General of the Army Douglas MacArthur and the Joint Chiefs of Staff—Fleet Admirals Ernest King and William D. Leahy, and Generals of the Army George Marshall and Henry H. Arnold (the latter being the commander of the U.S. Army Air Forces).

At the time, the development of the atomic bomb was a very closely guarded secret, known only to a few top officials outside the Manhattan Project (and to the Soviet espionage apparatus, which had managed to infiltrate or recruit agents within the program, despite the tight security around it), and the initial planning for the invasion of Japan did not take its existence into consideration. Once the atomic bomb became available, General Marshall envisioned using it to support the invasion if sufficient numbers could be produced in time.

The Pacific War was not under a single Allied commander-in-chief (C-in-C). Allied command was divided into regions: by 1945, for example, Chester Nimitz was the Allied C-in-C Pacific Ocean Areas, while Douglas MacArthur was Supreme Allied Commander, South West Pacific Area, and Admiral Louis Mountbatten was the Supreme Allied Commander, South East Asia Command. A unified command was deemed necessary for an invasion of Japan. Interservice rivalry over who it should be (the United States Navy wanted Nimitz, but the United States Army wanted MacArthur) was so serious that it threatened to derail planning. Ultimately, the Navy partially conceded, and MacArthur was to be given total command of all forces if circumstances made it necessary.

=== Considerations ===
The primary considerations that the planners had to deal with were time and casualties—how they could force Japan's surrender as quickly as possible with as few Allied casualties as possible. Before the First Quebec Conference, a joint Canadian–British–American planning team had produced a plan ("Appreciation and Plan for the Defeat of Japan") which did not call for an invasion of the Japanese Home Islands until 1947–48. The American Joint Chiefs of Staff believed that prolonging the war to such an extent was dangerous for national morale. Instead, at the Quebec conference, the Combined Chiefs of Staff agreed that Japan should be forced to surrender not more than one year after Germany's surrender.

The United States Navy urged the use of a blockade and airpower to bring about Japan's capitulation. They proposed operations to capture airbases in nearby Shanghai, China, and Korea, which would give the United States Army Air Forces a series of forward airbases from which to bombard Japan into submission. The Army, on the other hand, argued that such a strategy could "prolong the war indefinitely" and expend lives needlessly, and therefore that an invasion was necessary. They supported mounting a large-scale thrust directly against the Japanese homeland, with none of the side operations that the Navy had suggested. Ultimately, the Army's viewpoint prevailed.

Initially in early 1943, the Joint War Plans Committee (JWPC) and the Army's Strategy Section supported an invasion of Hokkaido via the Aleutians and Hawaii in 1945. They believed that Hokkaido was a well-placed, lightly defended island that offered suitable bases for a later invasion of Honshu. Planners eventually recognized however that the prospect of a successful invasion of Hokkaido in the summer of 1945 was increasingly unrealistic.

Physically, Japan made an imposing target, distant from other landmasses and with very few beaches geographically suitable for sea-borne invasion. Only Kyūshū (the southernmost island of Japan) and the beaches of the Kantō Plain (both southwest and southeast of Tokyo) were realistic invasion zones. The Allies decided to launch a two-stage invasion. Operation Olympic would attack southern Kyūshū. Airbases would be established, which would give cover for Operation Coronet, the attack on Tokyo Bay.

=== Assumptions ===
While the geography of Japan was known, the U.S. military planners had to estimate the defending forces that they would face. Based on intelligence available early in 1945, their assumptions included the following:

- "That operations in this area will be opposed not only by the available organized military forces of the Empire, but also by a fanatically hostile population."
- "That approximately three (3) hostile divisions will be disposed in Southern Kyushu and an additional three (3) in Northern Kyushu at initiation of the Olympic operation."
- "That total hostile forces committed against Kyushu operations will not exceed eight (8) to ten (10) divisions and that this level will be speedily attained."
- "That approximately twenty-one (21) hostile divisions, including depot divisions, will be on Honshu at the initiation of [Coronet] and that fourteen (14) of these divisions may be employed in the Kanto Plain area."
- "That the enemy may withdraw his land-based air forces to the Asiatic Mainland for protection from our neutralizing attacks. That under such circumstances he can possibly amass from 2,000 to 2,500 planes in that area by exercising a rigid economy, and that this force can operate against Kyushu landings by staging through homeland fields."

=== Olympic ===
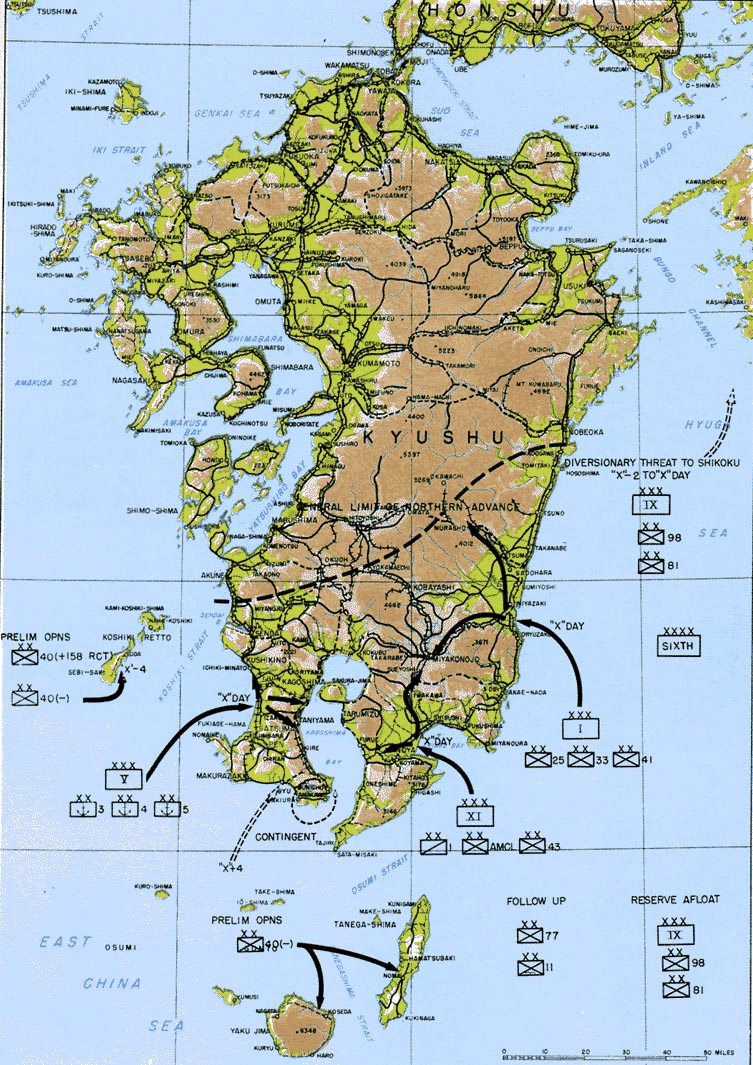
Map of Kyūshū showing planned US troop movements during Operation Olympic

Operation Olympic, the invasion of Kyūshū, was to begin on "X-Day", which was scheduled for November 1, 1945. The combined Allied naval armada would have been the largest ever assembled, including 42 aircraft carriers, 24 battleships, and 400 destroyers and destroyer escorts. Fourteen U.S. divisions and a "division-equivalent" (two regimental combat teams) were scheduled to take part in the initial landings. Using Okinawa as a staging base, the objective would have been to seize the southern portion of Kyūshū. This area would then be used as a further staging point to attack Honshu in Operation Coronet.

Olympic was also to include a deception plan, known as Operation Pastel. Pastel was designed to convince the Japanese that the Joint Chiefs had rejected the notion of a direct invasion and instead were going to attempt to encircle and bombard Japan. This would require capturing bases in Formosa, along the Chinese coast, and in the Yellow Sea area. However, as the actual build-up of American forces would clearly be directed towards Japan, the assault on China would then appear to be cancelled, with a new invasion seemingly being planned against Shikoku instead.

Tactical air support was to be the responsibility of the Fifth, Seventh, and Thirteenth Air Forces. These were responsible for attacking Japanese airfields and transportation arteries on Kyushu and Southern Honshu (e.g. the Kanmon Tunnel) and for gaining and maintaining air superiority over the beaches. The task of strategic bombing fell on the United States Strategic Air Forces in the Pacific (USASTAF)—a formation which comprised the Eighth and Twentieth air forces, as well as the British Tiger Force. USASTAF and Tiger Force were to remain active through Operation Coronet. The Twentieth Air Force was to have continued its role as the main Allied strategic bomber force used against the Japanese home islands, operating from airfields in the Mariana Islands. Following the end of the war in Europe in May 1945, plans were also made to transfer some of the heavy bomber groups of the veteran Eighth Air Force to airbases on Okinawa to conduct strategic bombing raids in coordination with the Twentieth. The Eighth was to upgrade their B-17 Flying Fortresses and B-24 Liberators to B-29 Superfortresses (the group received its first B-29 on August 8, 1945). In total, General Henry Arnold estimated that the bomb tonnage dropped in the Pacific Theater by USAAF aircraft alone would exceed 1,050,000 tons in 1945 and 3,150,000 tons in 1946, excluding the blast yields of nuclear weapons.

Before the main invasion, the offshore islands of Tanegashima, Yakushima, and the Koshikijima Islands were to be taken, starting on X−5. The invasion of Okinawa had demonstrated the value of establishing secure anchorages close at hand, for ships not needed off the landing beaches and for ships damaged by air attack.

Kyūshū was to be invaded by the Sixth United States Army at three points: Miyazaki, Ariake, and Kushikino. If a clock were drawn on a map of Kyūshū, these points would roughly correspond to 4, 5, and 7 o'clock, respectively. The 35 landing beaches were all named for automobiles: Austin, Buick, Cadillac, and so on through to Stutz, Winton, and Zephyr. (Note: Beach Organization for Operation against Kyushu; from COMPHIBSPAC OP Plan A11-45, August 10, 1945. Skates, pictorial insert.) With one corps assigned to each landing, the invasion planners assumed that the Americans would outnumber the Japanese by roughly three to one. In early 1945, Miyazaki was virtually undefended, while Ariake, with its good nearby harbor, was heavily defended.

The invasion was not intended to conquer the entire island, just the southernmost third of it, as indicated by the dashed line on the map labeled "general limit of northern advance". Southern Kyūshū would offer a staging ground and a valuable airbase for Operation Coronet.

After the name Operation Olympic was compromised by being sent out in unsecured code, the name Operation Majestic was adopted.

=== Coronet ===
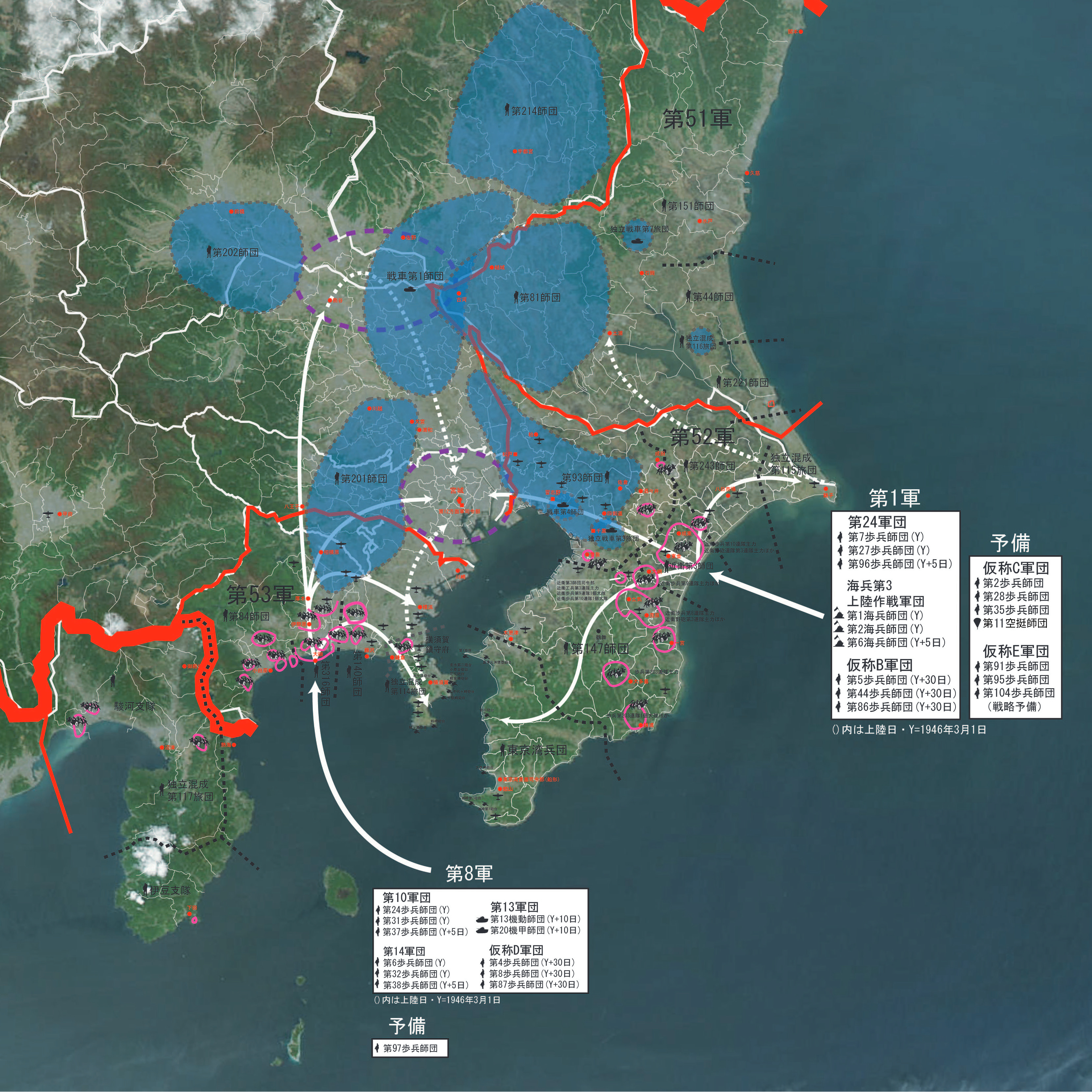
Map showing planned movements of American forces in Operation Coronet and Japanese units on the Kantō Plain

Operation Coronet, the invasion of Honshu at the Kantō Plain south of the capital, was to begin on "Y-Day", which was tentatively scheduled for March 1, 1946. Coronet would have been even larger than Olympic, with up to 45 U.S. divisions assigned for both the initial landing and follow-up (by comparison, the invasion of Normandy deployed twelve divisions in the initial landings). In the initial stage, the First Army would have invaded at Kujūkuri Beach, on the Bōsō Peninsula, while the Eighth Army invaded at Hiratsuka, on Sagami Bay; these armies would have comprised 25 divisions between them. Later, a follow-up force of up to twenty additional U.S. divisions and up to five or more British Commonwealth divisions would have landed as reinforcements. The Allied forces would then have driven north and inland, encircling Tokyo and pressing on toward Nagano.

=== Redeployment ===
Olympic was to be mounted with resources already present in the Pacific, including the British Pacific Fleet, a Commonwealth formation that included at least eighteen aircraft carriers (providing 25% of the Allied air power) and four battleships.

Tiger Force, a joint Commonwealth long-range heavy bomber unit, was to be transferred from RAF, RAAF, RCAF and RNZAF units and personnel serving with RAF Bomber Command in Europe. In 1944, early planning proposed a force of 500–1,000 aircraft, including units dedicated to aerial refueling. Planning was later scaled back to 22 squadrons and, by the time the war ended, to 10 squadrons: between 120 and 150 Avro Lancasters/Lincolns, operating out of airbases on Okinawa. Tiger Force was to have included the elite 617 Squadron, also known as "The Dambusters", which carried out specialist bombing operations.

Initially, US planners also did not plan to use any non-US Allied ground forces in Operation Downfall. Had reinforcements been needed at an early stage of Olympic, they would have been diverted from US forces being assembled for Coronet—for which there was to be a massive redeployment of units from the US Army's Southwest Pacific, China-Burma-India and European commands, among others. These would have included spearheads of the war in Europe such as the US First Army (15 divisions) and the Eighth Air Force. These redeployments would have been complicated by the simultaneous demobilization and replacement of highly experienced, time-served personnel, which would have drastically reduced the combat effectiveness of many units.

U.S. commanders rejected the Australian government's early request for inclusion of an Australian Army infantry division in the first wave (Olympic). Not even the initial plans for Coronet envisaged landing units from Commonwealth or other Allied armies on the Kantō Plain in 1946. The first official "plans indicated that assault, followup, and reserve units would all come from US forces". By mid-1945—when plans for Coronet were being reworked—many other Allied countries had "offered ground forces, and a debate developed" amongst Western Allied political and military leaders, "over the size, mission, equipment, and support of these contingents". Following negotiations, it was decided that Coronet would include a joint Commonwealth Corps, made up of infantry divisions from the Australian, New Zealand, British and Canadian armies. Reinforcements would have been available from those countries, as well as other parts of the Commonwealth. However, MacArthur blocked proposals to include an Indian Army division because of alleged differences in language, organization, composition, equipment, training and doctrine. He also recommended that the corps be organized along the lines of a U.S. corps, should use only U.S. equipment and logistics, and should train in the U.S. for six months before deployment; these suggestions were accepted.

The British Government suggested that: Lieutenant-General Sir Charles Keightley should command the Commonwealth Corps, a combined Commonwealth fleet should be led by Vice-Admiral Sir William Tennant, and that—as Commonwealth air units would be dominated by the RAAF – the Air Officer Commanding should be Australian. However, the Australian government questioned the appointment of Keightley, an officer with no experience in fighting the Japanese. Frederick Shedden suggested that Lieutenant General Leslie Morshead, an Australian who had been carrying out the New Guinea and Borneo campaigns, should be appointed. The war ended before the details of the corps were finalized.

After Italy's official declaration of war on Japan, on 27 July 1945, the Italian head of the Ministry of War, Stefano Jacini was planning to create an "expeditionary force" of 6,000 to 8,000 individuals who would be sent after 4 months of training (November 1945, coinciding with Operation Downfall) to aid any ground operation by the Allied Forces on Japanese soil and waters whilst being led by an autonomous Italian general which would be decided before the start of the operation by the Italian State. Whilst the allies never accepted nor rejected this proposal, they did unofficially reject an earlier proposal made by the Chief of Staff of the Italian Air Force who offered to send a crew with the following equipment: 2 Bomber and Liaison Wings (72 aircraft) and 3 Fighter and C/B [fighter-bomber] Wings (216 aircraft) fully equipped with material which would have to be supplied by the Allies, suggesting that any Italian desire to join the conflict would have to be autonomous as proposed by the Ministry of War.

=== Projected initial commitment ===
| Operation | Olympic | Coronet |
|---|---|---|
| Personnel | 705,556 | 1,171,646 |
| Vehicles | 136,812 | 222,514 |
| Shipping troop lift requirement (dwt) | 1,205,730 | 1,741,023 |
| Infantry divisions | 11 | 20 |
| Marine divisions | 3 | 3 |
| Armored divisions | 0 | 2 |
| Air groups | 40 | 50 |

Figures for Coronet exclude values for both the immediate strategic reserve of 3 divisions as well as the 17 division strategic reserve in the U.S. and any British/Commonwealth forces.

== Operation Ketsugō ==
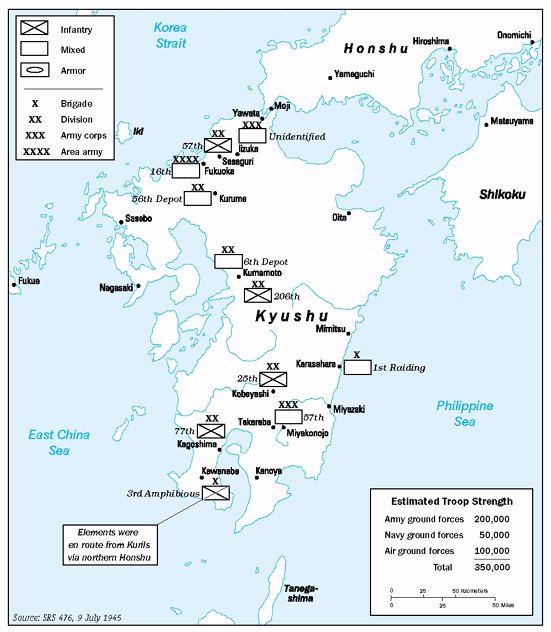
American estimates of Japanese troop strength on Kyūshū as of July 9, 1945

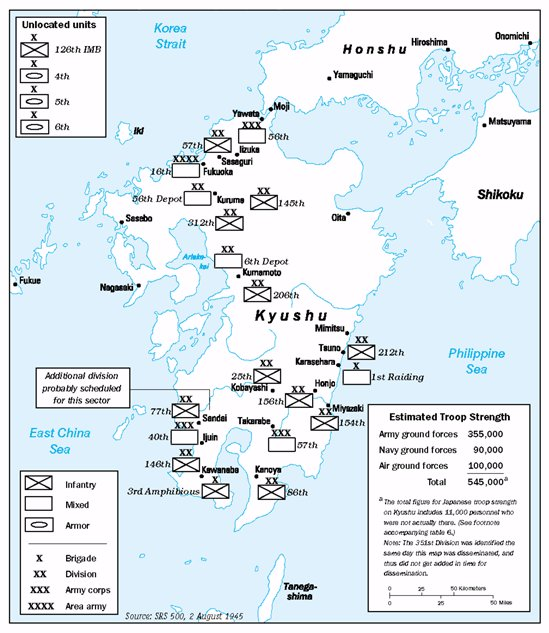
American estimates of Japanese troop strength on Kyūshū as of August 2, 1945

Meanwhile, the Japanese had their own plans. Initially, they were concerned about an invasion during the summer of 1945. However, the Battle of Okinawa went on for so long that they concluded the Allies would not be able to launch another operation before the typhoon season, during which the weather would be too risky for amphibious operations. Japanese intelligence predicted fairly closely where the invasion would take place: southern Kyūshū at Miyazaki, Ariake Bay and/or the Satsuma Peninsula. Unlike the Germans, who were fooled about the Normandy landings, the Japanese accurately predicted the location and timing of the planned invasion before the United States decided them.

While Japan no longer had a realistic prospect of winning the war, Japan's leaders believed they could make the cost of invading and occupying the Home Islands too high for the Allies to accept, which would lead to some sort of armistice rather than total defeat. The Japanese plan for defeating the invasion was called Operation Ketsugō (ja) (決号作戦, ketsugō sakusen) ("Operation: Decisive" or "Final Battle"). The Japanese planned to commit the entire population of Japan to resisting the invasion, and from June 1945 onward, a propaganda campaign calling for "The Glorious Death of One Hundred Million" commenced. The main message of "The Glorious Death of One Hundred Million" campaign was that it was "glorious to die for the holy emperor of Japan, and every Japanese man, woman, and child should die for the Emperor when the Allies arrived".

Although it was not realistic that the entire Japanese population would be killed off, both American and Japanese officers at the time predicted a Japanese death toll in the millions. From the Battle of Saipan onward, Japanese propaganda intensified the glory of patriotic death and depicted the Americans as merciless "white devils." During the Battle of Okinawa, Japanese officers had ordered civilians unable to fight to commit suicide rather than fall into American hands, and all available evidence suggests the same orders would have been given in the home islands. The Japanese were secretly constructing an underground headquarters in Matsushiro, Nagano Prefecture, to shelter the Emperor and the Imperial General Staff during an invasion. In planning for Operation Ketsugō, IGHQ overestimated the strength of the invading forces: while the Allied invasion plan called for fewer than 70 divisions, the Japanese expected up to 90.

=== Kamikaze ===
Admiral Matome Ugaki was recalled to Japan in February 1945 and given command of the Fifth Air Fleet on Kyūshū. The Fifth Air Fleet was assigned the task of kamikaze attacks against ships involved in the invasion of Okinawa, Operation Ten-Go, and began training pilots and assembling aircraft for the defense of Kyūshū, the first invasion target.

The Japanese defense relied heavily on kamikaze planes. In addition to fighters and bombers, they reassigned almost all of their trainers for the mission. More than 10,000 aircraft were ready for use in July (with more by October), as well as hundreds of newly built small suicide boats to attack Allied ships offshore.

Up to 2,000 kamikaze planes launched attacks during the Battle of Okinawa, achieving approximately one hit per nine attacks. At Kyūshū, because of the more favorable circumstances (such as terrain that would reduce the Allies' radar advantage, and the impressment of wood and fabric airframe training aircraft into the kamikaze role which would have been difficult for Allied radar systems of the time to detect and track), they hoped to raise that to one for six by overwhelming the US defenses with large numbers of kamikaze attacks within a period of hours. The Japanese estimated that the planes would sink more than 400 ships; since they were training the pilots to target transports rather than carriers and destroyers, the casualties would be disproportionately greater than at Okinawa. One staff study estimated that the kamikazes could destroy a third to half of the invasion force before landing.

Admiral King, Commander-in-Chief of the U.S. Navy, was so concerned about losses from kamikaze attacks that he and other senior naval officers argued for canceling Operation Downfall and for instead continuing the fire-bombing campaign against Japanese cities and the blockade of food and supplies until the Japanese surrendered. However, General Marshall argued that forcing surrender that way might take several years, if ever. Accordingly, Marshall and United States Secretary of the Navy Frank Knox concluded the Americans would have to invade Japan to end the war, regardless of casualties.

=== Naval forces ===
Despite the shattering damage it had absorbed by this stage of the war, the Imperial Japanese Navy, by then organized under the Navy General Command, was determined to inflict as much damage on the Allies as possible. Remaining major warships numbered four battleships (all damaged), five damaged aircraft carriers, two cruisers, 23 destroyers, and 46 submarines. However, the IJN lacked enough fuel for further sorties by its capital ships and planned instead to use its anti-aircraft firepower to defend naval installations while docked in port. Despite its inability to conduct large-scale fleet operations, the IJN still maintained a fleet of thousands of warplanes and possessed nearly 2 million personnel in the Home Islands, ensuring it a large role in the coming defensive operation.

In addition, Japan had about 100 Kōryū-class midget submarines, 300 smaller Kairyū-class midget submarines, 120 Kaiten manned torpedoes, and 2,412 Shin'yō suicide motorboats. Unlike the larger ships, these, together with the destroyers and fleet submarines, were expected to see extensive action defending the shores, with a view to destroying about 60 Allied transports.

The Navy trained a unit of frogmen to serve as suicide bombers, the Fukuryu. They were to be armed with contact-fuzed mines, and to dive under landing craft and blow them up. An inventory of mines was anchored to the sea bottom off each potential invasion beach for their use by the suicide divers, with up to 10,000 mines planned. Some 1,200 suicide divers had been trained before the Japanese surrender.

=== Ground forces ===
The two defensive options against amphibious invasion are strong defense of the beaches and defense in depth. Early in the war (such as at Tarawa), the Japanese employed strong defenses on the beaches with little or no manpower in reserve, but this tactic proved vulnerable to pre-invasion shore bombardment. Later at Peleliu, Iwo Jima, and Okinawa, they switched strategies and dug in their forces in the most defensible terrain.

For the defense of Kyūshū, the Japanese took an intermediate posture, with the bulk of their defensive forces a few kilometers inland, back far enough to avoid complete exposure to naval bombardment, but close enough that the Americans could not establish a secure foothold before engaging them. The counteroffensive forces were still farther back, prepared to move against the largest landing.

In March 1945, there was only one combat division in Kyūshū. Four veteran divisions were withdrawn from the Kwantung Army in Manchuria in March 1945 to strengthen the forces in Japan, and 45 new divisions were activated between February and May 1945. Most were immobile formations for coastal defense, but 16 were high quality mobile divisions. By August, the formations, including three tank brigades, had a total of 900,000 men. Although the Japanese were able to muster new soldiers, equipping them was more difficult. By August, the Japanese Army had the equivalent of 65 divisions in the homeland but only enough equipment for 40 and ammunition for 30.

The Japanese did not formally decide to stake everything on the outcome of the Battle of Kyūshū, but they concentrated their assets to such a degree that there would be little left in reserve. By one estimate, the forces in Kyūshū had 40% of all the ammunition in the Home Islands.

In addition, the Japanese had organized the Volunteer Fighting Corps, which included all healthy men aged 15 to 60 and women 17 to 40 for a total of 28 million people, for combat support and, later, combat jobs. Weapons, training and uniforms were generally lacking: many were armed with nothing better than antiquated firearms, molotov cocktails, longbows, swords, knives, bamboo or wooden spears, and even clubs and truncheons: they were expected to make do with what they had. One mobilized high school girl, Yukiko Kasai, found herself issued an awl and told, "Even killing one American soldier will do. ... You must aim for the abdomen." They were expected to serve as a "second defense line" during the Allied invasion, and to conduct guerrilla warfare in urban areas and mountains.

The Japanese command intended to organize its Army personnel according to the following plan:

Mobilization plan
| Region | Number mobilized |
|---|---|
| Kyushu | 900,000 |
| Kanto (Tokyo) | 950,000 |
| Korea | 247,000 |
| Total | 3,150,000 |
For the decisive battle
| Kyushu | 990,000 |
| Kanto | 1,280,000 |

== Allied re-evaluation of Operation Olympic ==
=== Air threat ===
US military intelligence initially estimated the number of Japanese aircraft to be around 2,500. The Okinawa experience was bad for the US—almost two fatalities and a similar number wounded per sortie—and Kyūshū was likely to be worse. To attack ships off Okinawa, Japanese planes had to fly long distances over open water; to attack ships off Kyūshū, they could fly overland and then short distances out to the landing fleets. Gradually, intelligence learned that the Japanese were devoting all their aircraft to the kamikaze mission and taking effective measures to conserve them until the battle. An Army estimate in May was 3,391 planes; in June, 4,862; in August, 5,911. A July Navy estimate, abandoning any distinction between training and combat aircraft, was 8,750; in August, 10,290. By the time the war ended, the Japanese actually possessed some 12,700 aircraft in the Home Islands, roughly half kamikazes. Ketsu plans for Kyushu envisioned committing nearly 9,000 aircraft according to the following sequence:

- 140 reconnaissance planes to detect the approach of the Allied fleet.
- 330 Navy bombers flown by highly trained pilots to attack the Allied carrier task force to prevent it from supporting the invasion convoys.
- 50 "land attack planes," 50 seaplane bombers, and 50 torpedo bombers flown by highly trained pilots for night attacks on convoy escorts.
- 825 Navy kamikazes to attack the landing convoys prior to their arrival off Kyūshū.
- 2,500 Army aircraft (conventional as well as suicide), together with 2,900 Naval trainers for kamikaze attacks against the landing fleet as it arrived and anchored (5,400 total).
- 2,000 Army and Navy "air superiority" fighters to escort the kamikazes and strafe landing ships.
- 100 transport planes carrying 1,200 commandos for a raid on the US airbases on Okinawa, following the success of earlier smaller-scale operations.

The Japanese planned to commit the majority of their air forces to action within 10 days of the Allied fleet's arrival off Kyūshū. They hoped that at least 15 to 20% (or even up to a half) of US transport ships would be destroyed before disembarkation. The United States Strategic Bombing Survey subsequently estimated that if the Japanese managed 5,000 kamikaze sorties, they could have sunk around 90 ships and damaged another 900, roughly triple the Navy's losses at Okinawa.

Allied counter-kamikaze preparations were known as the Big Blue Blanket. This involved adding more fighter squadrons to carriers in place of torpedo and dive bombers, and converting B-17s into airborne radar pickets in a manner similar to present-day AWACS. Nimitz planned a pre-invasion feint, sending a fleet to the invasion beaches a couple of weeks before the real invasion, to lure Japanese into making one-way flights, who would then find ships bristling with anti-aircraft guns instead of the valuable, vulnerable transports.

The main defense against Japanese air attacks would have come from the massive fighter forces being assembled in the Ryukyu Islands. The US Army Fifth and Seventh Air Forces and US Marine air units had moved into the islands immediately after the invasion, and air strength had been increasing in preparation for the all-out assault on Japan. In preparation for the invasion, an air campaign against Japanese airfields and transportation arteries had commenced before the Japanese surrender.

=== Ground threat ===
Through April, May, and June, Allied intelligence followed the buildup of Japanese ground forces, including five divisions added to Kyūshū, with great interest, but also some complacency, still projecting that in November the total for Kyūshū would be about 350,000 servicemen. That changed in July, with the discovery of four new divisions and indications of more to come. By August, the count was up to 600,000, and Magic cryptanalysis had identified nine divisions in southern Kyūshū—three times the expected number and still a serious underestimate of the actual Japanese strength.

Estimated troop strength in early July was 350,000, rising to 545,000 in early August.

The intelligence revelations about Japanese preparations on Kyushu emerging in mid-July transmitted powerful shock waves both in the Pacific and in Washington. On 29 July, MacArthur's intelligence chief, Major General Charles A. Willoughby, was the first to note that the April estimate allowed for the Japanese capability to deploy six divisions on Kyushu, with the potential to deploy ten. "These [six] divisions have since made their appearance, as predicted," he observed, "and the end is not in sight." If not checked, this threatened "to grow to [the] point where we attack on a ratio of one (1) to one (1) which is not the recipe for victory."

By the time of surrender, the Japanese had over 735,000 military personnel either in position or in various stages of deployment on Kyushu alone. The total strength of the Japanese military in the Home Islands amounted to 4,335,500, of whom 2,372,700 were in the Army and 1,962,800 in the Navy. The buildup of Japanese troops on Kyūshū led American war planners, most importantly General George Marshall, to consider drastic changes to Olympic, or replacing it with a different invasion plan.

=== Chemical weapons ===
Fears of "an Okinawa from one end of Japan to the other" encouraged the Allies to consider unconventional weapons, including chemical warfare. Widespread chemical warfare was considered against Japan's population and food crops. While large quantities of gas munitions were manufactured and plans were drawn, it is unlikely they would have been used. Richard B. Frank states that when the proposal reached Truman in June 1945, he vetoed the use of chemical weapons against personnel; their use against crops, however, remained under consideration. According to Edward J. Drea, the strategic use of chemical weapons on a massive scale was not seriously studied or proposed by any senior American leader; rather, they debated the tactical use of chemical weapons against pockets of Japanese resistance.

Although chemical warfare had been outlawed by the Geneva Protocol, neither the United States nor Japan was a signatory at the time. While the US had promised never to initiate gas warfare, Japan had used gas against the Chinese earlier in the war:

Fear of Japanese retaliation [to chemical weapon use] lessened because by the end of the war Japan's ability to deliver gas by air or long-range guns had all but disappeared. In 1944 Ultra revealed that the Japanese doubted their ability to retaliate against United States use of gas. “Every precaution must be taken not to give the enemy cause for a pretext to use gas,” the commanders were warned. So fearful were the Japanese leaders that they planned to ignore isolated tactical use of gas in the home islands by the US forces because they feared escalation.

— Skates

In addition to use against people, the U.S. military considered chemical attacks to kill crops in an attempt to starve the Japanese into submission. The Army began experimenting with compounds to destroy crops in April 1944, and within one year had narrowed over 1,000 agents to nine promising ones containing phenoxyacetic acids. One compound designated LN-8 performed best in tests and went into mass production. Dropping or spraying the herbicide was deemed most effective; a July 1945 test from an SPD Mark 2 bomb, originally crafted to hold biological weapons like anthrax or ricin, had the shell burst open in the air to scatter the chemical agent. By the time the war ended, the Army was still trying to determine the optimal dispersal height to cover a wide enough area. The ingredients in LN-8 and another tested compound would later be used to create Agent Orange, used during the Vietnam War.

=== Nuclear weapons ===
On Marshall's orders, Major General John E. Hull looked into the tactical use of nuclear weapons for the invasion of the Japanese home islands, even after the dropping of two strategic atomic bombs on Japan (Marshall did not think that the Japanese would capitulate immediately). Colonel Lyle E. Seeman reported that at least seven Fat Man-type plutonium implosion bombs would be available by X-Day, which could be dropped on defending forces. Seeman advised that American troops not enter an area hit by a bomb for "at least 48 hours"; the risk of nuclear fallout was not well understood, and such a short time after detonation would have exposed American troops to substantial radiation.

Ken Nichols, the District Engineer of the Manhattan Engineer District, wrote that at the beginning of August 1945, "[p]lanning for the invasion of the main Japanese home islands had reached its final stages, and if the landings actually took place, we might supply about fifteen atomic bombs to support the troops." An air burst 1,800–2,000 ft (550–610 m) above the ground had been chosen for the (Hiroshima) bomb to achieve maximum blast effects, and to minimize residual radiation on the ground, as it was hoped that American troops would soon occupy the city.

=== Alternative targets ===
The Joint Staff planners, taking note of the extent to which the Japanese had concentrated on Kyūshū at the expense of the rest of Japan, considered alternate places to invade such as the island of Shikoku, northern Honshu at Sendai, or Ominato. They also considered skipping the preliminary invasion and going directly at Tokyo. Attacking northern Honshu would have the advantage of a much weaker defense but had the disadvantage of giving up land-based air support (except the B-29s) from Okinawa.

=== Prospects for Olympic ===
MacArthur dismissed any need to change his plans:

I am certain that the Japanese air potential reported to you as accumulating to counter our OLYMPIC operation is greatly exaggerated. … As to the movement of ground forces… I do not credit… the heavy strengths reported to you in southern Kyushu. … In my opinion, there should not be the slightest thought of changing the Olympic operation.

However, King was prepared to oppose proceeding with the invasion, with Nimitz's concurrence, which would have set off a major dispute within the US government:

At this juncture, the key interaction would likely have been between Marshall and Truman. There is strong evidence that Marshall remained committed to an invasion as late as 15 August. … But tempering Marshall's personal commitment to invasion would have been his comprehension that civilian sanction in general, and Truman's in particular, was unlikely for a costly invasion that no longer enjoyed consensus support from the armed services.

=== Soviet intentions ===
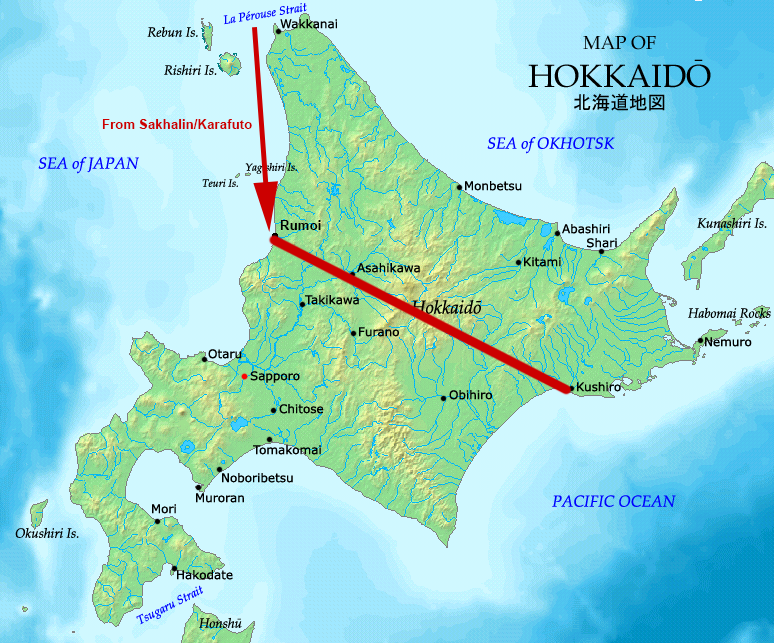
In a proposed invasion plan, Soviet forces were to land at the remote port of Rumoi and occupy Hokkaido north of a line from Rumoi to Kushiro

Unknown to the Americans, the Soviet Union also considered invading a major Japanese island, Hokkaido, by the end of August 1945, which would have put pressure on the Allies to act sooner than November.

In the early years of World War II, the Soviets had planned on building a huge navy to catch up with the Western world. However, the German invasion of the Soviet Union in June 1941 forced the suspension of this plan: the Soviets had to divert most of their resources to fighting the Germans and their allies, primarily on land, throughout most of the war, leaving their navy relatively poorly equipped. As a result, in Project Hula (1945), the United States transferred about 100 naval vessels out of the 180 planned to the Soviet Union in preparation for the planned Soviet entry into the war against Japan. The transferred vessels included amphibious assault ships.

At the Yalta Conference (February 1945), the Allies had agreed that the Soviet Union would take the southern part of the island of Sakhalin, which Japan had invaded during the 1904–1905 Russo-Japanese War, and which Russia had ceded in the Treaty of Portsmouth after the war (the Soviets already controlled the northern part), and the Kuril Islands, which had been assigned to Japan in the 1875 Treaty of St. Petersburg. On the other hand, no agreement envisaged Soviet participation in the invasion of Japan itself.

The Japanese had kamikaze aircraft in southern Honshu and Kyushu which would have opposed operations Olympic and Coronet. It is unknown to what extent they could have opposed Soviet landings in the far north of Japan. For comparative purposes, about 1,300 Western Allied ships deployed during the Battle of Okinawa (April–June 1945). In total, 368 ships, including 120 amphibious craft, were badly damaged, and another 28, including 15 landing ships and 12 destroyers, were sunk, mostly by kamikazes. The Soviets, however, had fewer than 400 ships, most of them not equipped for amphibious assault, when they declared war on Japan on August 8, 1945.

For Operation Downfall, the US military envisaged requiring more than 30 divisions for a successful invasion of the Japanese home islands. In comparison, the Soviet Union had about 11 divisions available, comparable to the 14 divisions the US estimated that it would require to invade southern Kyushu. The Soviet invasion of the Kuril Islands (August 18 – September 1, 1945) took place after Japan's capitulation on August 15. However, the Japanese forces in those islands resisted quite fiercely, although some of them proved unwilling to fight after Japan's surrender on August 15. In the Battle of Shumshu (August 18–23, 1945), the Soviet Red Army had 8,821 troops that were not supported by tanks and without back-up from larger warships. The well-established Japanese garrison had 8,500 troops and fielded about 77 tanks. The battle lasted one day, with minor combat actions going on for four more after the official surrender of Japan and the garrison, during which the attacking Soviet forces lost over 516 troops and five of the 16 landing ships (many of these formerly belonged to the US Navy and were later given to the Soviet Union) to Japanese coastal artillery, and the Japanese lost over 256 troops. According to Soviet claims, Soviet casualties during the Battle of Shumshu totaled up to 1,567, and the Japanese suffered 1,018 casualties.

During World War II, the Japanese had a naval base at Paramushiro in the Kuril Islands and several bases in Hokkaido. Since Japan and the Soviet Union maintained a state of wary neutrality until the Soviet declaration of war on Japan in August 1945, Japanese observers based in Japanese-held territories in Manchuria, Korea, Sakhalin, and the Kuril Islands constantly watched the port of Vladivostok and other seaports in the Soviet Union.

According to Thomas B. Allen and Norman Polmar, the Soviets had carefully drawn up detailed plans for the Far East invasions, except that the landing for Hokkaido "existed in detail" only in Stalin's mind and that it was "unlikely that Stalin had interests in taking Manchuria and even taking on Hokkaido. Even if he wanted to grab as much territory in Asia as possible, he was too much focused on establishing a beachhead in Europe more so than Asia."

== Estimated casualties ==
Due to the nature of combat in the Pacific Theater and the characteristics of the Japanese Armed Forces, it was accepted that a direct invasion of mainland Japan would be very difficult and costly. The Allies would not only have to contend with all available Japanese military forces that could be brought to bear, but also the resistance of a "fanatically hostile population." Depending on the scope and context, casualty estimates for American forces ranged from 220,000 to several million, and estimates of Japanese military and civilian casualties ran from the millions to the tens of millions. Casualty estimates did not include potential losses from radiation poisoning resulting from the tactical use of nuclear weapons or from Allied POWs who would have been executed by the Japanese.

In the aftermath of the Marianas Campaign, the Joint Chiefs of Staff (JCS) revised their planning document, "Operations against Japan subsequent to Formosa" (JCS 924), to reflect the experience gained. Taking into account the stiff resistance of the Japanese 31st Army at Saipan, they concluded that if U.S. forces had to defeat all 3.5 million Japanese soldiers who could be made available, "it might cost us half a million American lives and many times that number wounded." Despite the high numbers, by the spring of 1945 a figure of 500,000 battle casualties for the projected invasion was widely used in briefings, while totals of closer to a million were used for actual planning purposes. U.S. planners hoped that by seizing a few vital strategic areas they could establish "effective military control" over Japan without the need to clear the entire archipelago or defeat the Japanese on mainland Asia, thereby avoiding excessive losses.

Covering only the U.S. Army, the Army Service Forces (ASF) planning document of January 15, 1945, "Redeployment of the United States Army after the Defeat of Germany," expected that an average of 43,000 replacements for "dead and evacuated wounded" (Note: A nebulous term. As it applied to the invasion of Japan, depending on the stage of the campaign, that referred to soldiers whose wounds were sufficiently grave that they could not be treated within an "evacuation window" of from 30 to 120 days after landing.) would be needed each month between June 1945 and December 1946 to carry out the final phase of the war against Japan. Projected losses in these categories, excluding those of the Navy and Marine Corps, totaled approximately 723,000 through the end of 1946 and 863,000 through the first part of 1947.

ASF Casualty Estimate, January 15, 1945 (Excluding non-evacuated wounded, Navy, and Marine Corps casualties) (Note: Relatively high casualties for Q3 1945 can be explained by the need to prepare for operations on the China Coast and the more protracted campaign envisioned for the Ryukyus subsequent to Okinawa. Additionally, the possibility of US troops participating in an invasion of the Dutch East Indies was also discussed at the end of 1944 and the beginning of 1945 when the paper was written. Finally, there is the consideration of lag between the end of the last quarter (when the casualties were incurred) and the start of the next (the demand for replacements).)
| Quarter | Pacific Ocean Area | | Southwest Pacific | | North Pacific | | China-Burma-India | |
| Quarter | Dead | Evacuated Wounded | Dead | Evacuated Wounded | Dead | Evacuated Wounded | Dead | Evacuated Wounded |
|---|---|---|---|---|---|---|---|---|
| Q3 1945 | 10,000 | 23,000 | 13,000 | 29,000 | 1,000 | 1,500 | 2,000 | 6,000 |
| Q4 1945 | 16,000 | 35,000 | 12,000 | 28,500 | 1,000 | 1,000 | 2,000 | 6,000 |
| Q1 1946 | 24,000 | 50,500 | 11,000 | 24,000 | 1,000 | 1,000 | 2,000 | 7,000 |
| Q2 1946 | 28,000 | 61,000 | 11,000 | 23,500 | 1,000 | 1,000 | 2,000 | 7,000 |
| Q3 1946 | 30,000 | 64,000 | 11,000 | 25,000 | 1,000 | 1,000 | 2,000 | 7,000 |
| Q4 1946 | 30,000 | 65,500 | 10,000 | 23,500 | 1,000 | 1,000 | 2,000 | 7,000 |
| 1947 | 30,000 | 64,500 | 10,000 | 24,500 | 1,000 | 1,000 | 2,000 | 7,000 |
| Total | 168,000 | 363,500 | 78,000 | 178,000 | 7,000 | 7,500 | 14,000 | 47,000 |

Total for Downfall and Concurrent Operations
| Dead and Missing | 223,000 |
| Evacuated Wounded | 489,500 |
| Total | 712,500 |
Total to Defeat Japan (July 1945 – February 1947)
| Dead and Missing | 267,000 |
| Evacuated Wounded | 596,000 |
| Total | 863,000 |

Two days later on January 17, letters from President Roosevelt, General Marshall, and Admiral King to House Military Affairs Committee Chairman Andrew J. May were released to the New York Times, informing the public that "the Army must provide 600,000 replacements for overseas theaters before June 30, and, together with the Navy, will require a total of 900,000 inductions by June 30." Of the Navy's target of 300,000, a large proportion were required for "manning the rapidly expanding fleet" rather than replacing battle casualties.

Acting on the basis of sensitive information obtained from contacts in the military, former President Herbert Hoover, a close personal friend of incoming President Harry S. Truman, submitted a memorandum on May 15, 1945, to Secretary of War Henry Stimson. Hoover's memorandum indicated that defeating Japan could cost 0.5 to 1.0 million American lives. The same week, Kyle Palmer, Los Angeles Times war correspondent at Admiral Nimitz's headquarters, warned that "it will cost 500,000 to 750,000, perhaps 1,000,000 lives of American boys to end this war." Those numbers were given in the context of revised estimates of Japanese military strength, still classified, which indicated that the Japanese Army had the potential to mobilize 5,000,000 to 6,000,000 soldiers rather than the 3.5 million assessed by JCS 924.

On May 28, Hoover and Truman met at the White House and conversed for several hours. At Truman's request Hoover prepared four memoranda on the issues discussed (1. The European Food Organization, 2. The Domestic Food Organization, 3. The Creation of a War Economic Council, and 4. The Japanese Situation—in which Hoover twice repeated his figure of 0.5 to 1.0 million American deaths). Truman "seized" on memo 4 and asked for written judgements on it from Stimson, Undersecretary of State Joseph Grew, Director of the Office of Mobilization and Reconversion Fred Vinson, and former Secretary of State Cordell Hull. Truman was particularly interested in hearing from Grew and Stimson and asked to meet with them in person.

Neither Hull nor Grew objected to Hoover's estimate, but Stimson forwarded his copy of "Memo 4" to Marshall's deputy Chief of Staff, General Thomas T. Handy. As with the "worst case" scenario from JCS 924, Handy wrote that "under our present plan of campaign" (emphasis original), "the estimated loss of 500,000 lives [...] is considered to be entirely too high." Both Marshall and General George A. Lincoln, chief of the Operations Division (OPD), agreed with Handy's remarks. Nonetheless, it was emphasized that an invasion would cost "a lot of lives."

Appalled at the prospect of an impending bloodbath, Truman ordered a meeting scheduled for June 18, 1945, involving the JCS, Stimson, and Secretary of the Navy James Forrestal. At stake was the decision to press forward with Downfall or to opt for the Navy's long-standing proposal of blockade and bombardment. To support the meeting, the Joint War Plans Committee (JWPC) hastily assembled a table illustrating the casualties that could be expected in an invasion of Japan based on the experience of the Battle of Leyte. That estimate, which was significantly lower than those that had been made previously, was deleted from a subsequent version of the document and not shown to the President. The meeting concluded with all participants agreeing that the invasion would be "bloody but essential for victory." Truman expressed hope of avoiding "an Okinawa from one end of Japan to the other."

Throughout the summer, as the intelligence picture concerning Japanese Army strength in the Home Islands became more and more unfavorable, together with new data from the fighting on Iwo Jima and Okinawa, casualty predictions were continually revised upward. During the first week of August, approximately 50 reporters from the United States, Britain, and Australia were given an "off the record" briefing at General MacArthur's headquarters in Manila, where they were informed that final operations against Japan could result in up to a million American casualties. (Note: This briefing was delivered by Major Selwyn Pepper, an accomplished journalist in civilian life who contributed to three Pulitzer Prize winning projects.) An internal memorandum from Marshall to Leahy implied that by June 30, 1946, there would be approximately 275,000 Army soldiers in serious enough condition to require hospitalization in the United States. That excluded the dead and missing; losses of other branches; patients previously discharged and sent back to their units or invalidated from service; and patients in forward hospitals in Hawai'i, the Philippines, Australia, Kyushu, and elsewhere. The number of beds to be made available in such forward hospitals was planned to total about 150,000, a general rule being that available beds should exceed expected casualties (excluding deaths) by 20%. By war's end nearly half a million Purple Heart medals were on hand, with more being produced in anticipation of the invasion; in 2003 there were still some 120,000 of this stockpile left.

Writing in "Military Review: June 1946" No. 3, MacArthur's intelligence chief, Major General Charles A. Willoughby, concluded that destroying "two to two and a half Japanese divisions [exacts] a total of 40,000 American battle casualties on land." Using that "sinister ratio," he claimed that U.S. forces could have expected over 700,000 casualties at four key locations in mainland Japan. The estimate excluded losses from "the shattering kamikaze attack," combat against Naval ground forces personnel and militia, and any reinforcements the Japanese might have been able to bring in to the battle areas. Willoughby regarded that ratio as "a completely authentic yardstick to forecast what it would have taken in losses had we gone in shooting."

Major General Willoughby's Estimate, June 1946 (excluding Navy)
| Location | Japanese divisions | American casualties |
|---|---|---|
| Kyushu | 13–14 | 200,000 |
| Shikoku | 4–5 | 80,000 |
| Kanto Plain | 22 | 400,000 |
| Sendai | 2 | 30,000 |

Estimated Losses from Kamikaze & Bomber Attacks
| Source | Ships sunk | Ships damaged | Killed & missing | Wounded | Notes |
|---|---|---|---|---|---|
| USSBS | 90 | 900 | N/A | N/A | Assumes 5,000 kamikaze sorties |
| "Postwar Estimate" | 90 | 900 | 21,000 | N/A | |
| Dr. R. P. Hallion | 900 "sunk or damaged" | | 22,000 killed and wounded | | Assumes 6,400 kamikaze aircraft |
| Dr. R. P. Hallion | 2,300 "sunk or damaged" | | 57,000 killed and wounded | | Assumes 16,400 kamikaze aircraft (Note: Considered unrealistically high) |
| D.M. Giangreco | 95 | N/A | 29,000 | N/A | 6 sunk from surface attacks |
| Japanese Planners | N/A | | 50,000 killed and wounded | | From kamikaze attacks alone |
| Japanese Planners | 150–200 | N/A | N/A | | "Conservative" estimate |
| Japanese Planners | 675 | N/A | N/A | | 500 from kamikazes, 125 from surface attacks |

== POW executions ==
In addition to battle casualties, hundreds of thousands of prisoners of war and civilian internees were also scheduled to be executed by the Japanese. Beginning in the summer of 1944, Japanese leaders issued a series of directives to prison camp commandants that all prisoners were to be "liquidated" when Allied troops approached the camps. The objective was to prevent the prisoners from rioting or being utilized as a fighting force, and camp commandants were given flexibility as to how the "liquidation" would be accomplished. (Note: The text of one order reads, "Whether they are destroyed individually or in groups, or however it is done, with mass bombing, poisonous smoke, poisons, drowning, decapitation, or what, dispose of them as the situation dictates. In any case it is the aim not to allow the escape of a single one, to annihilate them all, and not to leave any traces.") The main emphasis was to "annihilate all captives, not allowing a single one to escape," and that "no trace" should be left of their existence or the existence of the prison camps. At the end of the war many POWs were in the process of digging their own graves in preparation for their deaths.

Historically, the orders led to the massacre of POWs on several occasions, including on Palawan Island, in which men were burned alive in their barracks, shot, or stabbed. The Palawan massacre prompted American forces to organize daring rescue missions to save other prisoners from execution, such as the "Great Raid" on Cabanatuan. On August 20, 1945, the Japanese government secretly distributed an order formally authorizing guards and other perpetrators to flee to escape punishment for their crimes.

Allied Prisoners in Japanese Hands, August 1945
| Prisoners of War | Civilian Internees | Total |
|---|---|---|
| 170,000 | 115,000 | 285,000 |

== Japanese casualties ==
Throughout the Pacific War, the Imperial Japanese Army earned a reputation of fighting practically to the last man. By the early summer of 1945, there had not been one instance of an organized surrender by any Japanese unit, even under the most hopeless conditions. The Japanese suffered especially from starvation and disease: according to historian Akira Fujiwara, out of 2.3 million military deaths between 1937 and 1945, 1.4 million (61%) were attributable to these causes. A further 358,000 (15.5%) died from drowning as a result of the American air and submarine campaign against Japanese shipping. During the reconquest of the Philippines as many as 80% of Japanese deaths were from starvation and disease, while the proportion in New Guinea may have reached 97%. Even in battles where starvation was not as great of a factor, Japanese losses were skewed higher because their island garrisons had no means of resupply or evacuation. Former Ensign Kiyoshi Endo, an Iwo Jima survivor, later recalled: "The number of deaths on the Japanese side was much larger, because the Americans rescued and treated their injured. Japanese soldiers who were injured could have survived if they were rescued, but that was not possible, so they all died."

In contrast to previous campaigns, Admiral King pointed out that the Japanese Army in the Home Islands would have several advantages that its overseas counterparts did not. It would have more "room to maneuver, and would not be so vulnerable to the overpowering air and naval power which the Allies had been able to bring to bear [...] on small and isolated islands." It would also be near to its bases of supply and reinforcement, and have the support of a friendly population. For these reasons Admiral King was cautious about using casualty rates from previous battles to predict the course of fighting in Japan.

Under the Ketsugō (決号, "conclusion") plan, all divisions assigned to coastal defense were ordered to stand and fight "even to utter annihilation," while heavy counterattacks by reserves aimed to force a decisive battle near the beachheads. If that had failed, the surviving mobile elements would have retreated to strongholds around Mount Aso on Kyushu and in Nagano Prefecture on Honshu for protracted resistance. Given their chosen tactics, American military historian Richard B. Frank concluded that "it is hard to imagine that fewer than [40 to 50%]" of Japanese soldiers and sailors in the invasion areas "would have fallen by the end of the campaign."

Civilian casualties were also expected to be high, both as a direct result of military action and indirectly from other causes. During the Battle of Okinawa, between 10 and 25% of the civilian population died. A worst-case scenario, published on July 21, 1945, by physicist William B. Shockley, predicted that "at least" 5 to 10 million Japanese—military and civilians—could die, with a corresponding American casualty total of up to 4 million. The war ended before this document, "Proposal for Increasing the Scope of Casualties Studies," could be considered in detail. Army Service Forces planners assessed that approximately one third of Japanese civilians within the invasion areas on Kyushu and Honshu would flee as refugees or die, leaving the remainder (including wounded and sick) to be cared for by the occupation authorities.

ASF Estimate of Effect on Japanese Civilians
| Location | Initial Population | Refugees and Deaths | Remaining behind U.S. lines |
|---|---|---|---|
| Southern Kyushu | 3,300,000 | 1,100,000 | 2,200,000 |
| Kanto Plain | 14,500,000 | 5,100,000 | 9,400,000 |
| Total | 17,800,000 | 6,200,000 | 11,600,000 |

Japanese leaders regarded Ketsugō as apocalyptic battle in which they would either succeed or be destroyed as a nation. Propagandists frequently repeated the slogan that 'all 100 million people of the Empire should be prepared to sacrifice themselves,' and that even if they failed, "the memory of Japan will be inscribed in history forever."

Internally, it was believed that while the whole people would not be annihilated, losses would be heavy. In an August 13 meeting with Army Chief of Staff Umezu, Chief of the Naval General Staff Toyoda, and Foreign Minister Togo, Admiral Takijiro Onishi claimed, "If we are prepared to sacrifice 20 million Japanese lives in a special attack effort, victory shall be ours!" Later Marquis Koichi Kido also gave the figure of 20 million to an interrogator for the Tokyo War Crimes Tribunal, but in reference to total casualties instead of deaths. Lt. Col. Masahiko Takeshita, a staff officer at the War Ministry and brother in law of War Minister Korechika Anami, testified that:

We did not believe that the entire people would be completely annihilated through fighting to the finish. Even if a crucial battle were fought in the homeland and the Imperial Forces were confined to the mountainous regions, the number of Japanese killed by enemy forces would be small. Despite the constant victories of Japanese troops in the China Incident, relatively few Chinese were killed. Almost all the strategic points in China were occupied, but the Chungking Government could not be defeated. [But] even if the whole [Japanese] race were all but wiped out, its determination to preserve the national polity would be forever recorded in the annals of history.

As a result of the American naval blockade and strategic bombing campaign, the food situation in Japan had become difficult. By the end of the war the average person consumed 10 to 25% fewer calories than in 1941, and this amount was declining. In January 1946, future Prime Minister Shigeru Yoshida warned that unless emergency food aid was rushed to Japan, up to 10 million people could starve to death by the end of 1946. Other estimates, including those of agricultural experts working under MacArthur's headquarters, ranged from 7 million to 11 million.

== Appendix 1: Landing schedules for Olympic and Coronet ==
Operation Olympic landing schedule
| Date | Miyazaki Plain | Ariake Bay | Kagoshima | Satsuma Peninsula | General Reserve | Outlying Islands |
|---|---|---|---|---|---|---|
| X-5 | – | – | – | – | – | 40th Division, 158th RCT |
| X-Day | 25th, 33rd Divisions | 43rd Division, 1st Cavalry Division | 2nd, 3rd, 5th Marine Divisions | – | – | – |
| X+1 | – | Balance of above divisions | – | | – | – |
| X+2 | 41st Division | Americal Division, 112th RCT | – | – | – | – |
| X+3 | (From General Reserve) | | | 98th, 81st Divisions | 158th RCT | – |
| X+4 | – | Balance of Americal Div. | | – | – | – |
| X+5 | – | – | – | 77th Division | – | – |
| X+22 | (From General Reserve) | | | | 11th Airborne Division | – |
| X+22 | 13 Divisions, 2 RCTs | | | | | 1 Division, 1 RCT |
| Final | 815,548 men | | | | | |

Operation Coronet Landing Schedule
| Date | Sagami Bay | Boso Peninsula | General Reserve | Strategic Reserve | | |
| Date | Sagami Bay | Boso Peninsula | General Reserve | Philippines | US Mainland | Commonwealth Corps |
|---|---|---|---|---|---|---|
| Y-Day | 24th, 31st, 37th, 6th, 32nd, 38th Infantry Divisions, 13th, 20th Armored Divisions | 7th, 27th, 96th Infantry Divisions, 1st, 4th, 6th Marine Divisions | 97th Infantry Division (with Western Force) | – | – | – |
| Y+30 | 4th, 87th, 8th Infantry Divisions | 86th, 44th, 5th Infantry Divisions | – | – | – | – |
| Y+35 | (From General Reserve) | | 2nd, 28th, 35th Infantry Divisions, 11th Airborne Division | – | – | – |
| Y+60 | (Rear Echelon) | | | – | – | – |
| After Y+60 | (From Strategic Reserve) | | | 95th, 104th, 91st Infantry Divisions | 10th Mountain Division, 5 unnamed Armored Divisions, 11 unnamed Infantry Divisions | 3rd UK Division, 6th Canadian Division, 10th Australian Division, 2nd New Zealand Division, 1 unnamed Australian Division |
| After Y+60 | 25 Divisions | | | 25 Divisions | | |
| After Y+60 | 1,171,646 men (Incl. 11th AB Div. (8,556) and 81,002 others from Kyushu) | | | 120,000 men | 735,000 men | 200,000 men |

== Appendix 2: Opposing ground force concentration plans ==
Olympic (Southern Kyushu only)
| Date | US | Japanese |
|---|---|---|
| X to X+7 | 12 divisions, 2 RCTs | 6 divisions |
| X+7 to X+14 | 13 divisions, 2 RCTs | 12 divisions |
| Final | 13 divisions, 2 RCTs | 17 divisions |
| Personnel strength | 815,548 (includes 40th Division) | 990,000 (Army only) |

Note: final personnel figure of 815,548 derived from earlier documentation; includes approximately 90,000 men (11th Airborne Division and 81,000 others) who will be transferred to Honshu.

Coronet
| Date | Allied | Japanese |
|---|---|---|
| Y-Day | 15 divisions | 20 divisions |
| Y+30 | 25 divisions | 28–33 divisions |
| Final | 50 divisions | 28–33 divisions |
| Personnel strength | 2,220,000 | 1,280,000 (Army only) |

Japanese Naval Ground Forces
| Location | Battalions | Personnel strength |
|---|---|---|
| Miura Peninsula (Coronet Area) | 12 | 20,000 |
| Sasebo Naval Base Area (Olympic Area) | 10 | 16,000 |
| Kure Naval Base Area (Hiroshima) | 6 | 10,000 |
| Southwestern Shikoku | 6 | 10,000 |
| Maizuru Naval Base Area | 6 | 10,000 |
| Shimokita Peninsula (N. Honshu) | 6 | 9,000 |
| Chinkai Naval Guard District (Korea) | 3 | 3,000 |
| Total | 49 | 78,000 |

Although the Japanese Navy had more than 1 million personnel in the Home Islands by August 1945, less than 100,000 were actually organized into ground combat units. Ground forces were disposed as above, to be placed under tactical command of the Army during combat operations.

== See also ==
- 1945 – Alternate history novel by Robert Conroy depicting Operation Downfall
- The Burning Mountain – Alternate history novel by Alfred Coppel depicting the operation in the wake of a failed Manhattan Project
- Operation Causeway – The planned American invasion of the Japanese-occupied Taiwan, the Kinmen Islands and Xiamen Bay on Mainland China.
- Operation Sea Lion – The planned German invasion of the United Kingdom
- Operation Unthinkable – Contemporaneous British plans for war against the Soviet Union
- Soviet–Japanese War
- Battle of Okinawa

== Notes ==
=== Bibliography ===
- Allen, Thomas B.; Polmar, Norman (1995). Code-Name Downfall: The Secret Plan to Invade Japan-And Why Truman Dropped the Bomb. New York: Simon & Schuster. ISBN 978-0684804064.
- Bauer, Jack; Coox, Alvin D. (August 1965). "Olympic vs Ketsu-Go". Marine Corps Gazette. 49 (8).
- Brower, Charles F. (2012). Defeating Japan: the joint chiefs of staff and strategy in the Pacific War, 1943 - 1945 (1st ed.). Basingstoke: Palgrave Macmillan. ISBN 978-1-137-02522-7.
- Coffey, Thomas M. (1988). Iron Eagle: The Turbulent Life of General Curtis LeMay. New York: Avon Books. ISBN 978-0-380-70480-4.
- Day, David (1992). Reluctant Nation: Australia and the Allied Defeat of Japan, 1942–1945. New York: Oxford University Press. ISBN 978-0-19-553242-5.
- Dower, John W. (1986). War Without Mercy: Race & Power In the Pacific War (1993 ed.). W. W. Norton & Co. ISBN 0-394-75172-8.
- Drea, Edward J. (1998). "Japanese Preparations for the Defense of the Homeland & Intelligence Forecasting for the Invasion of Japan". In the Service of the Emperor: Essays on the Imperial Japanese Army. Nebraska: University of Nebraska Press. ISBN 978-0-8032-1708-9.
- Feifer, George (2001). The Battle of Okinawa: The Blood and the Bomb. Guilford, CT: The Lyons Press. ISBN 978-1-58574-215-8.
- Frank, Richard B. (1999). Downfall: The End of the Imperial Japanese Empire. New York: Random House. ISBN 978-0-679-41424-7.
- Giangreco, Dennis M. (2009). Hell to Pay: Operation Downfall and the Invasion of Japan, 1945–1947. Annapolis, MD: Naval Institute Press. ISBN 978-1-59114-316-1.
- ———; Moore, Kathryn (December 1, 2003). "Are New Purple Hearts Being Manufactured to Meet the Demand?". History News Network.
- Giangreco, Dennis M. (July 1997). "Casualty Projections for the U.S. Invasions of Japan, 1945–1946: Planning and Policy Implications". Journal of Military History. 61 (3): 521–81. doi:10.2307/2954035. JSTOR 2954035.
- Glantz, David (Spring 1995). "The Soviet Invasion of Japan". Quarterly Journal of Military History. 7 (3).
- Horner, David (1982). High Command. Sydney: Allen & Unwin. ISBN 978-0-86861-076-4.
- MacEachin, Douglas J. (December 1998). "The Final Months of the War With Japan: Signals Intelligence, U.S. Invasion Planning, and the A-Bomb Decision". CIA Center for the Study of Intelligence. Archived from the original on June 12, 2007.
- Matloff, Maurice (1953). US Army in WWII: Strategic Planning for Coalition Warfare, 1943-1944. Center of Military History, Department of the Army.
- Murray, Williamson; Millet, Alan (2000). A War To Be Won. Belknap Press. ISBN 0674006801.
- Nichols, Kenneth (1987). The Road to Trinity: A Personal Account of How America's Nuclear Policies Were Made. New York: Morrow. ISBN 978-0-688-06910-0.
- Perret, Geoffrey (1991). There's A War to be Won. New York: Random House. ISBN 9780394578316.
- Silkett, Wayne A (1994). "Downfall: The Invasion that Never Was" (PDF). The US Army War College Quarterly: Parameters. 24 (Autumn). doi:10.55540/0031-1723.1696. Archived from the original (PDF) on June 8, 2010.
- Skates, John Ray (1994). The Invasion of Japan: Alternative to the Bomb. Columbia, SC: University of South Carolina Press. ISBN 978-0-87249-972-0.
- Spector, Ronald H. (1985). Eagle Against the Sun: The American War with Japan. Random House. ISBN 978-0-394-74101-7.
- Sutherland, Richard K.; et al. (May 28, 1945). ""Downfall": Strategic Plan for Operations in the Japanese Archipelago" (PDF). Archived from the original (PDF) on September 23, 2021 – via ABCM Education.
- Thomas, Evan (March 2007). "The Last Kamikaze". World War II Magazine: 28.
- Tillman, Barrett (2007). LeMay. New York: Palgrave Macmillan. p. 224. ISBN 978-1-4039-7135-7.
- "XIII "Downfall"". Reports of General MacArthur: the Campaigns of MacArthur in the Pacific. Vol. 1. Facsimile. 1994. LCCN 66-60005. Archived from the original on August 17, 2019.
