= Thirty-Sixth Army (Japan) =

Japanese Thirty Sixth Army
- Active: July 21, 1945 - August 15, 1945
- Country: Empire of Japan
- Branch: Imperial Japanese Army
- Type: Infantry
- Role: Corps
- Garrison/HQ: Urawa, Saitama
- Nickname(s): Fuji (富士)
- Engagements: Operation Downfall

The Japanese 36th Army (第36軍, Dai-sanjyūroku gun) was an army of the Imperial Japanese Army during the final days of World War II.

== History ==
The Japanese 36th Army was formed on July 21, 1944 under the Japanese 12th Area Army as part of the last desperate defense effort by the Empire of Japan to counter the projected invasion of the Japanese capital region by Allied forces during Operation Downfall. It was based in Urawa city, Saitama prefecture to the north of the Tokyo metropolitan area, from which it could be used to reinforce units to either the north or south of Tokyo as necessary.

The Japanese 36th Army consisted mostly of poorly trained reservists, conscripted students and Volunteer Fighting Corps home guard militia. It was demobilized after the surrender of Japan on August 15, 1945 without having seen combat.

== List of commanders ==
=== Commanding officer ===
	Name	From	To
1	Lieutenant General Toshimichi Uemura	18 July 1944	6 August 1945

=== Chief of Staff ===
	Name	From	To
1	Major General Masami Ishii	18 July 1944	1 February 1945
2	Major General Shikanosuke Tokunaga	1 February 1945	1 September 1945
