= Kantokuen =

Planned World War II Japanese military campaign

- Part of Pacific War of World War II
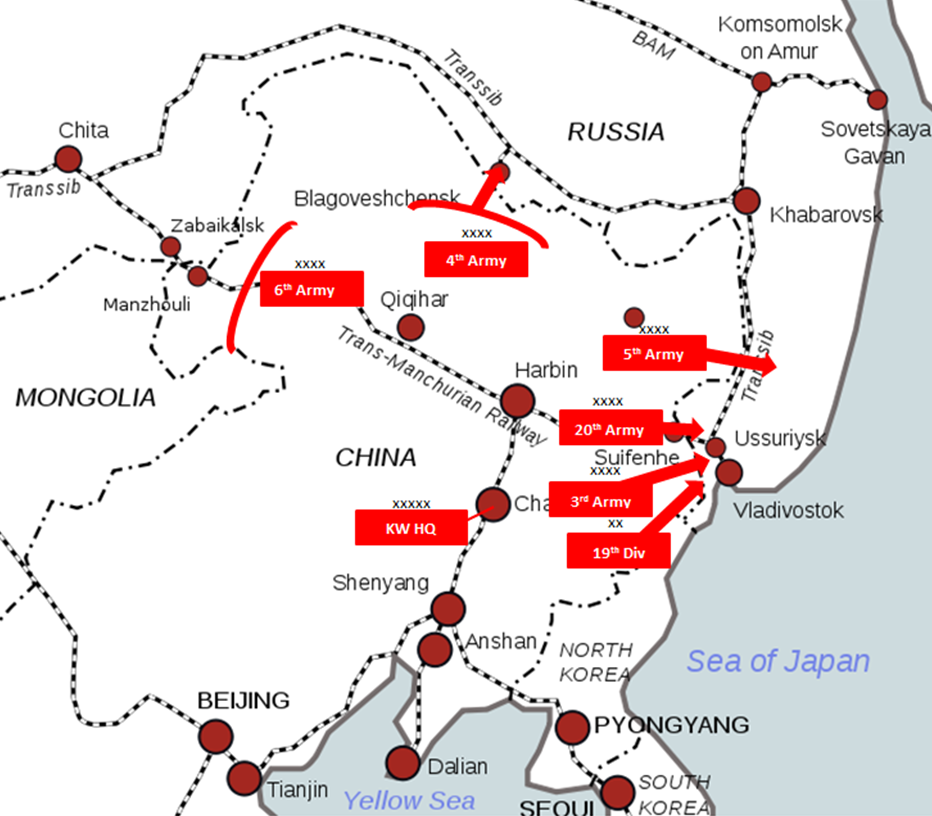
- A map outlining the initial Japanese offensive moves against the Soviet Union, with final objective being a line that ran along the western slope of the Greater Khingan Range
- Operational scope: Strategic
- Location: Manchuria, Mongolia, Soviet Union
- Planned: September 1941
- Planned by: Japanese Imperial General Headquarters
- Objective: Occupation of the Far East of the Soviet Union
- Outcome: Cancelled on August 9, 1941

Kantokuen (Japanese: 関特演, from 関東軍特種演習, Kantōgun Tokushu Enshū, "Kwantung Army Special Maneuvers") was an operational plan created by the General Staff of the Imperial Japanese Army for an invasion and occupation of the Russian Far East, capitalizing on the outbreak of the Soviet–German War in June 1941. Involving seven Japanese armies and a major portion of the empire's naval and air forces, it would have been the largest combined arms operation in Japanese history up to that point, and one of the largest of all time.

The plan was approved in part by Emperor Hirohito on July 7 and involved a three-step readiness phase followed by a three-phase offensive to isolate and destroy the Soviet defenders within six months. After growing conflict with simultaneous preparations for an offensive in Southeast Asia, together with the demands of the Second Sino-Japanese War and dimming prospects for a swift German victory in Europe, Kantokuen fell out of favour at Imperial General Headquarters and was eventually abandoned after increased economic sanctions by the United States and its allies.

Nevertheless, the presence of large Japanese forces in Manchuria forced the Soviets, who had long anticipated an attack from that direction, to retain considerable military resources in Siberia throughout World War II.

== Background ==
The roots of anti-Soviet sentiment in Imperial Japan existed before the foundation of the Soviet Union itself. Eager to limit tsarist influence in East Asia after the Russo-Japanese War (1904–1905) and then to contain the spread of Bolshevism during the Russian Civil War, the Japanese deployed some 70,000 troops into Siberia from 1918 to 1922 as part of their intervention on the side of the White movement, occupying Vladivostok and other key points east of Lake Baikal. After the international withdrawal from Russian territory and the establishment of the Soviet regime, the Imperial Japanese Army, mindful of the Soviets' potential as a military power and in keeping with the convention of Russia as a traditional enemy, made contingency plans for a future war. Initially defensive in nature, they envisioned an invasion by the Red Army into Chinese territory that would then be parried by a Japanese counterattack from Korea, with the decisive battlefield being southern Manchuria. After the Japanese invaded Manchuria in 1931, Japanese and Soviet troops found themselves facing one another along a border thousands of kilometers in length. To protect the puppet state of Manchukuo and to seize the initiative early against the Red Army, the IJA adopted a policy of halting any Soviet advance along the border and fighting the greater part of the war in Siberia, an "epoch-making change" in Japanese strategic thought. The transition from the strategic defensive to the strategic offensive would not be reversed until 1945, when Japan was facing disaster during the Pacific War. Moreover, Japanese plans progressively increased in scope from relatively small-scale operations to gigantic multistage campaigns, which envisioned seizing virtually the entire Soviet Far East as far as Lake Baikal.

=== 1937 and beyond ===
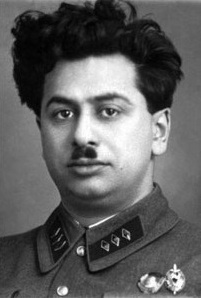
Commissar 3rd Class Lyushkov, photographed prior to 1939

Japanese-Soviet relations reached a low point by 1937, with an increasing sense of crisis on both sides. The Kwantung Army, Japan's occupation force in Manchuria, was openly hostile to the Soviets and appeared to be spoiling for a fight. This army, which expanded over time from a minor garrison command into a full-fledged army group, acted as a "self-contained, autonomous" entity almost entirely independent from the central government. The Kwantung Army's history was punctuated by a long record of insubordination and unilateral military aggression, which Tokyo often weakly accepted as a fait accompli. As the Kwantung Army's power increased, the Soviet–Japanese border conflicts worsened, culminating in the Kanchazu Island incident in which a Soviet river gunboat was sunk by Japanese shore batteries, killing 37 personnel. These episodes, together with reciprocal political and military subversion by both sides (Note: The Japanese recruited White Russian agents and the Soviets sent material support to China both before and during the war with Japan.) led both Soviet and Japanese figures to conclude that a future showdown was likely, even inevitable.

After the outbreak of the Second Sino-Japanese War in July 1937, however, Japanese options in Manchuria suddenly became very limited, greatly reducing their potential threat to Siberia. The Soviets were eager to capitalize on this by signing the Sino-Soviet Non-Aggression Pact that year, and began supplying the Chinese with weapons and equipment. On February 13, 1938, Pravda triumphantly declared:

...the Japanese Army, which possesses a strength of about 1,200,000 men, 2,000 planes, 1,800 tanks, and 4,500 heavy artillery pieces, committed about 1,000,000 troops and a greater part of its arms in China.

— Pravda

Despite their predicament, the Japanese continued to formulate war plans against the Soviet Union, and their operational plan of 1937, though crude and logistically deficient, provided the basis for all subsequent developments until 1945. (Note: Japanese planners expected that only 1,000 trucks could be made available and that the supply burden would be borne by horses and coolies (laborers).) This plan called for a sudden initial onslaught against the Soviet Maritime Province facing the Pacific Ocean (also referred to as "Primorye"), coupled with holding actions in the north and west. If the first phase was successful, the other fronts would also transition to the offensive after receiving reinforcements.

While the Japanese were bogged down in China, the Red Army was experiencing its own disaster. In 1936, Soviet General Secretary Joseph Stalin began the Great Purge, killing or imprisoning hundreds of thousands of his own people, including army officers, often on trumped-up or fictitious charges. As a result, the Red Army's fighting power was severely weakened, an observation seemingly confirmed by poor showings at the Battle of Lake Khasan in 1938 and in the Winter War against Finland in 1940. Fear led some to defect or flee abroad, and on June 13, 1938, Genrikh Lyushkov, Chief of the Far Eastern Department of the NKVD, crossed the border into Manchuria and turned himself in to the IJA, bringing with him a wealth of secret documents on Soviet military strength and dispositions in the region. Lyushkov's defection was a major intelligence coup for Japan, and he continued to work against the USSR up until he disappeared during the Soviet invasion of Manchuria in August 1945.

=== Hachi-Go plans ===
Independently of their yearly planning, the Operations Bureau of the Japanese Army General Staff and the Kwantung Army co-operated in 1938 and 1939 on a pair of related contingencies under the umbrella term "Operational Plan No. 8," or the "Hachi-Go" plan. Both variants, designated Concepts "A" and "B," examined the possibility of an all-out war with the Soviet Union beginning in 1943. Both were far larger than anything previously conceived of by the Japanese: against an expected 60 Soviet divisions, the IJA would commit up to 50 of its own, to be delivered incrementally from China and the Home Islands. Concept A closely mimicked the 1937 war plan by calling for attacks across the eastern and northern borders of Manchuria while maintaining a defensive stance in the west, but the more ambitious Concept B examined the possibility of striking out into the vast steppe between the Great Khingan Mountains and Lake Baikal in the hopes of quickly cutting the Trans-Siberian Railway. Such a move, the Japanese believed, would immediately isolate the whole region from European Russia and doom the remaining defenders to defeat in detail. The scope of operations was enormous: the two sides would be engaged over a front nearly 5,000 kilometers (3,100 miles) in length, with Japan's final objectives being up to 1,200 km (750 mi) deep into Soviet territory. In terms of distances, Concept B would have dwarfed even Operation Barbarossa, the German invasion of the Soviet Union in June 1941. (Note: For comparison, Operation Barbarossa was launched over a front of 2,900 km (1,800 mi) with the deepest penetrations being about 1,000 km (620 mi) (Defense of Brest Fortress and Battle of Moscow).)

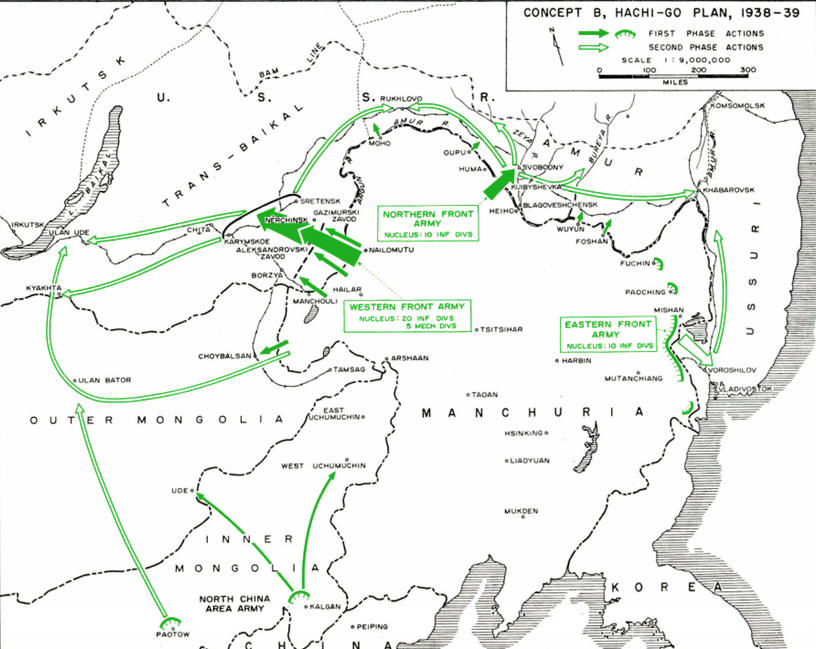
Hachi-Go Concept B

Projected concentration of forces, Hachi-Go concept A
	Japan (50 divisions)			USSR (60 divisions)		
Time	D-Day	D+60	D+90	D-Day	D+60	D+90
Eastern Front	12	20	20	15	20	20
Northern Front	8	13	15	6	12	15
Western Front	3	8	15	9	18	25
Divs not yet arrived	27	9	0	30	10	0

Projected concentration of forces, Hachi-Go concept B
	Japan (45 divisions)			USSR (60 divisions)		
Time	D-Day	D+60	D+90	D-Day	D+60	D+90
Eastern Front	5	8	10	15	18	18
Northern Front	3	8	10	6	12	12
Western Front	15	20	25	9	20	30
Divs not yet arrived	22	9	0	30	10	0

As impressive as these plans appeared in theory, however, the Japanese were forced to acknowledge several harsh realities preventing their implementation in the near future. Specifically with regard to Concept B, the railway network in Manchuria had not been sufficiently expanded to support such a far-reaching offensive, and the supplies on hand in the country were seriously below the required levels. Furthermore, the ongoing war in China precluded the concentration of the planned 50 divisions without fatally weakening the Japanese effort there. In addition, Imperial General Headquarters concluded that to sustain a drive out to Lake Baikal, a fleet of some 200,000 motor vehicles would be necessary, more than twice as many as anything the entire Japanese Army ever had at a given time. Popular support for Concept B finally dissipated in army circles after the 1939 Battle of Khalkhin Gol demonstrated the extensive challenges of sustaining even a small force so far away from the nearest railheads. From then on, Japanese offensive planning against the Soviets chiefly focused on the northern and the eastern fronts, with any western advances being limited to relatively modest gains on the far slope of the Great Khingan range.

== Decision 1941 ==
=== Junbi Jin and "the persimmon" ===
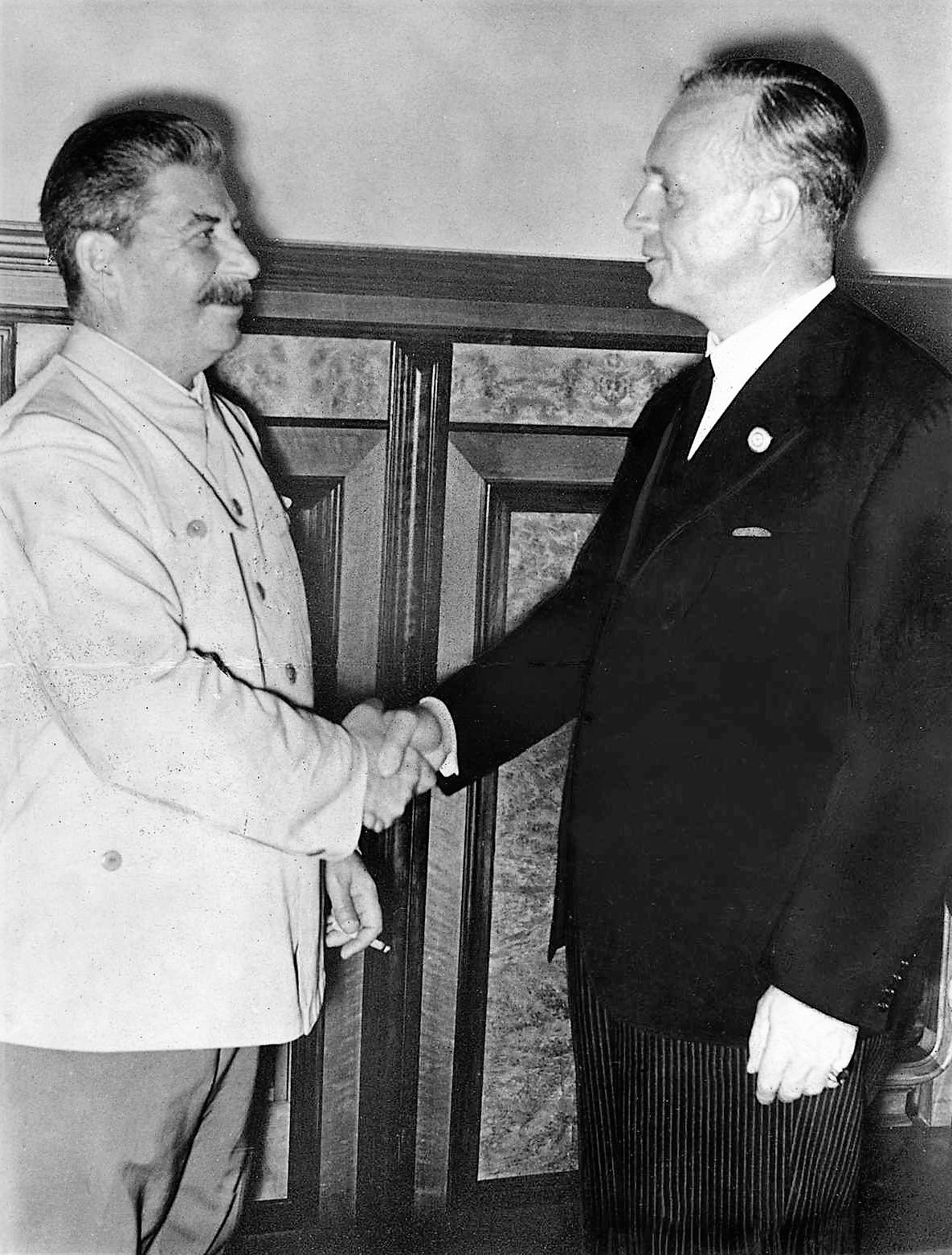
Soviet General Secretary Stalin and German Minister for Foreign Affairs Ribbentrop shaking hands, 23 August 1939

Toward the end of his life, Adolf Hitler reportedly lamented: "It is certainly regrettable that the Japanese did not enter the war against Soviet Russia alongside us. Had that happened, Stalin's armies would not now be besieging Breslau and the Soviets would not be standing in Budapest. We would together have exterminated Bolshevism before the winter of 1941." From the Japanese perspective, however, Germany's attitude toward cooperation against the Soviets from 1939 to 1941 was one of ambivalence, even duplicity. After the Japanese defeat at Khalkhin Gol, the sudden unveiling of the Molotov–Ribbentrop Pact was met with shock and anger in Japan, where it was seen as a direct violation of the Anti-Comintern Pact and a betrayal of their common interests. Consequently, in April 1941 Japan felt free to arrange its own Neutrality Pact with the Soviets, as tension with the West, particularly the United States, began to mount over the Japanese occupation of Vichy French Indochina the previous year. Amid a barrage of Allied economic sanctions throughout 1940 and 1941, the growing threat of war in the south and the sense of "tranquility" in the north tended to divert Japanese attention away from the long-planned campaign in Siberia. This shift was particularly welcomed by the Imperial Japanese Navy, which traditionally favored a policy of Nanshin-ron (southward expansion) while maintaining a deterrent against the Soviet Union, as opposed to the Hokushin-ron (northward expansion) favored by the Imperial Japanese Army.

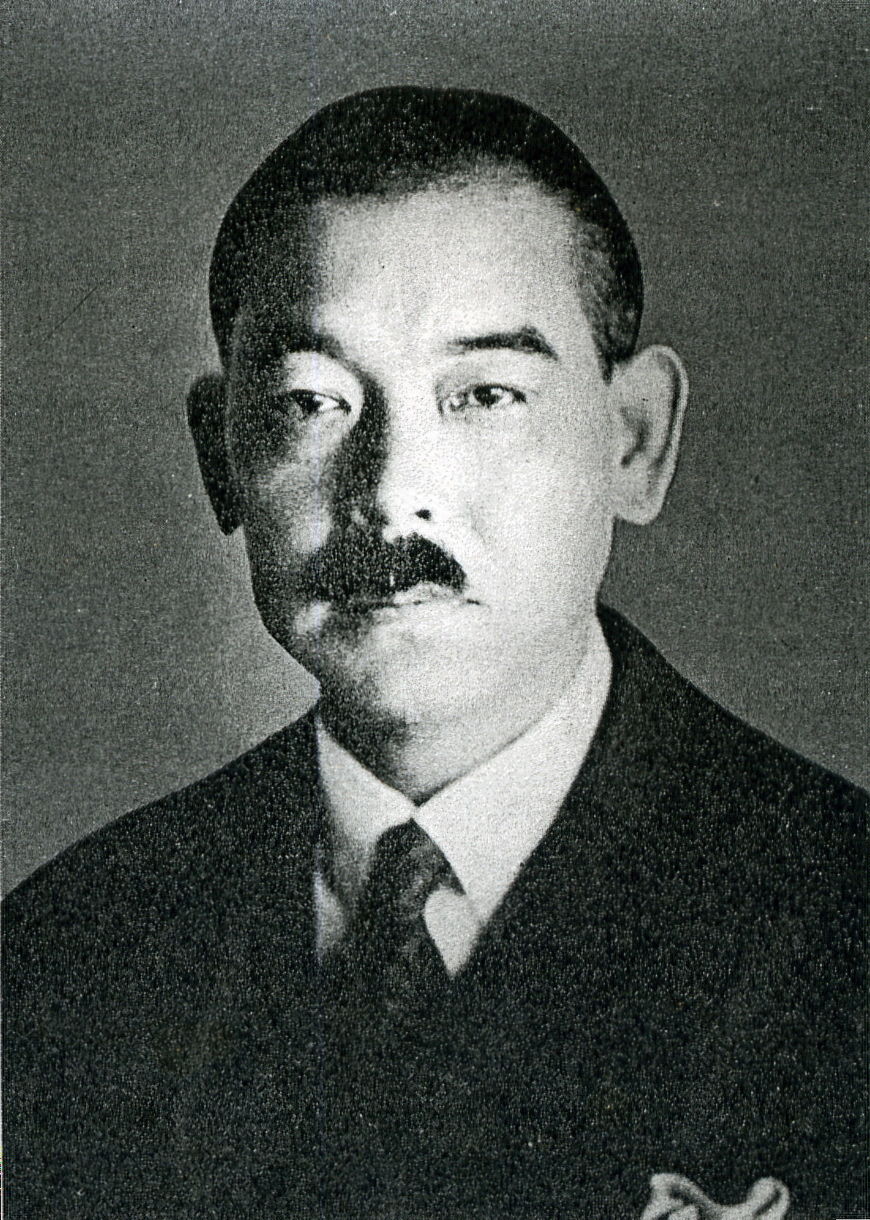
Yosuke Matsuoka, photographed in 1932

Hence, it was with great shock and consternation that the Japanese government met the news of Operation Barbarossa, Hitler's invasion of the Soviet Union in June 1941. Prime Minister Fumimaro Konoe, mortified over this "second betrayal" of Japan, even considered abandoning the Tripartite Pact. On the other hand, Foreign Minister Yosuke Matsuoka immediately argued that Japan should jettison its Neutrality Pact with the Soviets and launch an attack in coordination with Germany. Matsuoka's views were supported by both the Kwantung Army and powerful elements of the IJA General Staff, particularly Major General Shin'ichi Tanaka, Chief of the Operations Bureau, who were eager for a "quick decision." The hardliners' push for war with the Soviet Union came into conflict with Japan's existing flexible response policy, referred to as Junbi Jin Taisei ("Preparatory Formation Setup"). Under this concept, intervention in the event of a Soviet–German war would only be entertained if events took a favorable turn for Japan. Although the Junbi Jin doctrine had only been officially articulated in June, it would ultimately withstand the renewed pressures from the "Go North" faction and define Japanese strategic thinking throughout 1941.

Junbi Jin encountered its first serious test in the form of an emergency 24 June Army-Navy conference in the wake of Barbarossa, in which the "Go North" directly clashed with their "Go South" opponents over how Japan should take advantage of the new strategic picture. As a result of this conference, a compromise based on the Junbi Jin idea was reached: the army would be allowed to make preparations to invade Siberia should the circumstances permit, but only if such preparations would not interfere with simultaneous planning for war in the south.

Although this arrangement was accepted in principle, there were still disagreements over exactly how the Army would go about resolving the "northern question" as well as the timing of such a "resolution." The dispute was summarized by the popular metaphor of "the persimmon," with the hardliners in the Army General Staff (AGS) and the Kwantung Army arguing for an offensive even if the fruit was "still green" (that is, even if the Soviets had not suffered a catastrophic collapse against Germany), while their opponents prioritized dealing with the Western powers and the ongoing war in China, and thus wished to limit commitments to Manchuria, seeing an invasion as not viable unless the fruit had already "ripened and fell". The AGS concluded that if Japan was going to engage in hostilities in 1941, it was imperative for the fighting to be over by mid-October, because the bitter climate of Siberia would severely disrupt military activities during wintertime. Therefore, if the Army needed 60–70 days to complete operational preparations and another 6 to 8 weeks to defeat the Soviets in the first phase of the offensive, the overall window of action was quite limited. In response, the Army General Staff proposed a "crash schedule" for planning purposes intended to "shave off" as much time as possible:

- 28 June: Decide on mobilization
- 5 July: Issue mobilization orders
- 20 July: Begin troop concentration
- 10 August: Decide on hostilities
- 24 August: Complete readiness stance
- 29 August: Concentrate two divisions from North China in Manchuria, bringing the total to 16
- 5 September: Concentrate four further divisions from the homeland, bringing the total to 22; complete combat stance
- 10 September (at latest): Commence combat operations
- 15 October: Complete first phase of war

All in all, the AGS called for 22 divisions with 850,000 men (including auxiliary units) supported by 800,000 tons of shipping to be made ready for the war with the USSR. Ideally, the Soviets, in their scramble to throw all available forces against Hitler, would have also reduced the strength of their infantry forces in the Far East by half and their armored and air forces by two thirds, which would give the Kwantung Army a two-to-one superiority. The War Ministry as a whole, however, was not in agreement with the Army hawks. Although it supported the notion of reinforcing the north, it preferred a far more modest limit of only 16 divisions between the Kwantung and Korea Armies, a force with which the Kwantung Army considered it to be "impossible" to engage the Soviets, suitable only for mop-up operations in the aftermath of a German victory on the Eastern Front.

=== Kantokuen ===
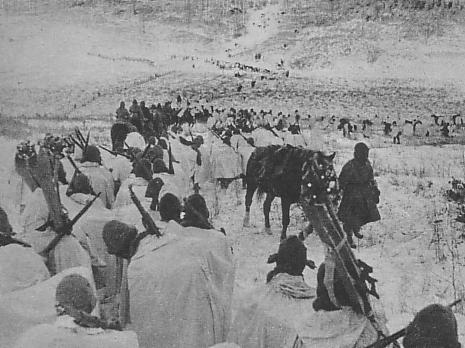
"Special Maneuvers" underway, 1941

Stung by their initial setback at the hands of the War Ministry, the IJA hardliners would get their revenge, at least on paper. During a personal visit on 5 July 1941, Major General Shin'ichi Tanaka, AGS Operations Chief and co-leader (along with Matsuoka) of the "Strike North" faction in Tokyo, managed to persuade War Minister Hideki Tojo to support Army General Staff's opinions concerning the "rightness" and "viability" of reinforcing Manchuria. General Tanaka and his supporters pushed for a greater commitment than even the Army's June 1941 plan, a total of up to 25 divisions, under the guise of establishing the readiness stance of only 16 divisions preferred by the War Ministry. Tanaka's plan involved two stages, a buildup and readiness phase (No. 100 setup) that would be followed by the offensive stance (No. 101 and 102 setups) during which the Kwantung Army would await the order to attack. The entire process was referred to by the acronym of "Kantokuen," from (Kantogun Tokushu Enshu), or Kwantung Army Special Maneuvers. With Tojo's support for Kantokuen secured, the hardliners completed their circumvention of the War Ministry on July 7, when General Hajime Sugiyama visited the Imperial Palace to request Hirohito's official sanction for the build up. After assurances from the general that the Kwantung Army would not attack on its own initiative after reinforcements had been received, the Emperor relented.

Operationally speaking, Kantokuen was essentially identical to the War Plan of 1940 but with an abbreviated force structure (20–30 as opposed to 43 divisions) that presumably banked on the Soviet inability to reinforce the Far East in light of the conflict against Germany. The level of commitment, however, was still enormous and by far the single greatest mobilization in the history of the Japanese Army. To facilitate the operation, a tremendous number of both combat and logistical assets would have to be dispatched to Manchuria on top of the existing structure. In particular, to capitalize on the Japanese advantage of interior lines, the railways in the north and the east had to be expanded to accommodate the increased burden carried by an offensive war. Additionally, port facilities, military housing, and hospitals were also to be augmented.

Like the previous concepts drawn up in the aftermath of the Nomonhan Incident, Kantokuen would begin with a massive initial blow on the Ussuri Front against Primorye that would be followed up with another attack to the North against Blagoveshchensk and Kuibyshevka. Under the umbrella organization of the First Area Army, the Japanese Third and Twentieth Armies, supported by the 19th Division of the Korea Army, would penetrate the border south of Lake Khanka to overcome the main Soviet defensive lines and threaten Vladivostok. Simultaneously, the Fifth Army would strike just south of Iman (now Dalnerechensk) to complete the isolation of the Maritime Province, sever the Trans-Siberian Railway, and block any reinforcements arriving from the north. In northern Manchuria, the Fourth Army would at first hold the Amur River line before it transitioned to the offensive against Blagoveshchensk. Meanwhile, two reinforced divisions of Japanese troops outside the Kantokuen force structure would start operations against Northern Sakhalin from both the landward and the seaward sides with the aim of wiping out the defenders there in a pincer movement. Other second-stage objectives included the capture of Khabarovsk, Komsomolsk, Skovorodino, Sovetskaya Gavan, and Nikolayevsk. Additionally, amphibious operations against Petropavlovsk-Kamchatsky and other parts of the Kamchatka Peninsula were contemplated.

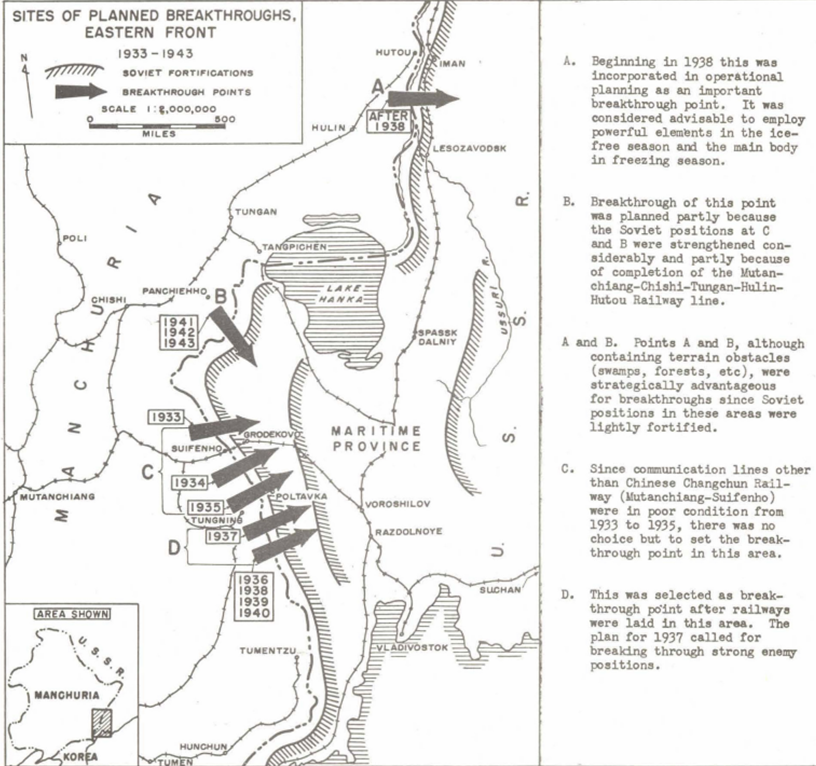
Planned Japanese penetrations on the Ussuri Front, with dates of addition in response to Soviet fortification

The allocation of forces was never firmly agreed upon and underwent several revisions during the planning stage (see table below). Two variants drawn up on 8 July 1941 were in close agreement with regard to the forces to be deployed on the Eastern (Ussuri) Front (13 to 14 divisions), but the strength allocated to the Fourth Army varied from 1 to 5 divisions because there was no consensus over whether the offensive against Blagoveshchensk should be launched simultaneously with that against Primorye. The Kwantung Army was concerned about the prospect of simultaneous offensives on both the Amur and Ussuri Fronts and on 9 July suggested a direct attack on Khabarovsk as an alternative to Blagoveshchensk. The Army General Staff rejected the idea since no developed plans then existed for such an operation. Instead, on 11 July, General Tanaka proposed raising the total forces in Manchuria to 30 divisions, but nothing came of that. On 29 July, the Kwantung Army decided to abandon the idea of simultaneous attacks in the north and east for an all-out offensive on the Ussuri Front with defensive operations elsewhere. Only after the first stage would additional forces be reallocated to the Amur. Meetings between Prime Minister Hideki Tojo and General Tanaka on 31 July confirmed the "sequential" approach. The total forces would be limited to only 24 divisions, but at least 17 of them would be committed to the Eastern Front, and the entire Kwantung Army reserve (another 5 divisions) was to be concentrated at Mutanchiang, very near the eastern border.

To ensure the success of the first phase of the invasion, enormous forces would be gathered. By 16 September, it was decided that "for operational preparations lasting three months and involving 23 or 24 divisions on the offensive (including the Korea Army)," the logistical basis would be 1,200,000 men, 35,000 motor vehicles, 500 tanks, (Note: Japan then had no formal tank divisions, but the 1st and 2nd Tank Groups, which functioned similarly to divisions, were attached to the Third and Fifth Armies, respectively. According to General Tanaka, there were about 900 tanks in the entire Kwantung Army in the summer of 1943. The composition of its tank forces was then little different from two years earlier.) 400,000 horses, and 300,000 laborers. That would have meant, however, that the Western Front facing the Mongolian People's Republic and the Trans-Baikal region could be defended by only one division, the 23rd, as well as the equivalent in miscellaneous forces of a few more. (Note: According to Coox and JSOM, Vol. I, there were no additional border guards units explicitly called up for Kantokuen; in late 1941, a total of 13 BGUs and 11 Garrison Units in all of Manchuria, of these five (the 8th BGU, Arshaan Guards, and 9th, 1st, and 14th IGUs) were located west of the line Tonghua – Changchun – Qiqihar. Since the Japanese rated those formations as approximately brigade strength, the IJA would have a maximum of just over 5 division-equivalents for defensive warfare on the Western Front.) Indeed, during the initial phase of operations, the Japanese Sixth Army was allocated only the 23rd Division and the 8th Border Guards Unit, veterans of the fighting at Khalkhin Gol two years earlier. To minimize the danger from a Soviet counteroffensive in the west while the bulk of the Japanese Army was engaged in the east, the IJA hoped that delaying actions and the vast expanses of the Gobi Desert and Hailar Plain would serve as "strategic buffers" to prevent the Red Army from mounting a serious challenge to the heart of Manchuria before the main body had regrouped for a pivot westward. The final objective of the Japanese troops was a line running through Skovorodino and the western slopes of the Great Khingan Mountains, along which they would defeat the remaining Soviet forces and transition to a defensive stance.

Air power played a crucial role in the plan. Before the outbreak of the Pacific War, the Japanese intended to dispatch some 1,200 to 1,800 planes in 3 air divisions to bolster the existing 600 to 900 that were already in Manchuria, which would co-operate with about 350 Navy craft to launch a "sudden," "annihilating" attack on the Soviet Far East Air Force at the outset of hostilities. If they had succeeded, the Japanese air forces would then have focused their efforts toward supporting the ground troops on the tactical level, cutting Soviet lines of communication and supply (particularly in the Amur and Trans-Baikal regions), and blocking air reinforcements from arriving from Europe.

Kantokuen variants by date with hypothetical order of battle

8 July 1941	Kwantung Army Reserve	Western Front		Northern Front	Eastern Front							Summary	Emphasis
8 July 1941	Kwantung Army Reserve	Arshaan Direction	Hailar Direction	Amur Direction	Front Reserve	Sanjiang Direction	Lake Khanka (north)	Lake Khanka (west)	Suifenhe Direction	Dongning Direction	Hunchun Direction	Summary	Emphasis
8 July 1941	21st, 53rd, 52nd, 54th Divs	6th Army (23rd Division, 3 Independent Garrison Units)		4th Army (1st Division)	None	3rd Cavalry Brigade, 3 Independent Garrison Units	5th Army (10th, 11th, 24th, 28th, 51st Divs)	20th Army (14th, 25th Divs)	3rd Army (8th, 9th, 12th, 20th, 29th, 57th Divs)		19th Div, Hunchun Garrison	Total	Offensive on the Eastern Front
8 July 1941	4 Divisions	1 Division		1 Division	14 Divisions							20 Divisions	Offensive on the Eastern Front
8 July 1941	4th, 6th, 16th, 41st, 56th Divs	6th Army (23rd Division, 3 Independent Garrison Units)		4th Army (1st, 21st, 33rd, 51st, 52nd, 54th Divs)	None	3rd Cavalry Brigade, 3 Independent Garrison Units	5th Army (10th, 11th, 24th, 28th Divs)	20th Army (14th, 25th Divs)	3rd Army (8th, 9th, 12th, 20th, 29th, 57th Divs)		19th Div, Hunchun Garrison	Total	Simultaneous Offensives on Northern and Eastern Fronts
8 July 1941	5 Divisions	1 Division		6 Divisions	13 Divisions							25 Divisions	Simultaneous Offensives on Northern and Eastern Fronts
29 July 1941	4th, 6th, 16th, 41st, 56th Divs	6th Army (23rd, 54th Divs)		4th Army (1st, 52nd Divs)	21st, 33rd Divs	5th Army (10th, 11th, 24th, 28th, 51st, Divs, 3rd Cavalry Brigade)		20th Army (8th, 14th, 25th, 29th Divs)	3rd Army (9th, 12th, 19th, 20th, 57th Divs)			Total	Offensive on the Eastern Front
29 July 1941	5 Divisions	2 Divisions		2 Divisions	16 Divisions							25 Divisions	Offensive on the Eastern Front
29 July 1941	5 Divisions	HQ: Qiqihar		HQ: Bei'an		HQ: Dong'an		HQ: Jixi	HQ: Laoheishan			25 Divisions	Offensive on the Eastern Front
29 July 1941	Commanding Officer	Jiro Sogawa		Kesago Nakajima		Jo Iimura		Kameji Seki	Masakazu Kawabe			25 Divisions	Offensive on the Eastern Front
After 31 July 1941	4th, 41st, 52nd, 54th, 56th Divs (to be concentrated at Mutanchiang)	6th Army (23rd Division)		4th Army (1st Division)	16th, 21st, 22rd Divs	5th Army (10th, 11th, 24th, 28th, 51st Divs, 3rd Cavalry Brigade)		20th Army (8th, 14th, 25th, 29th Divs)	3rd Army (9th, 12th, 19th, 20th, 57th Divs)			Total	Offensive on the Eastern Front
After 31 July 1941	5 Divisions	1 Division		1 Division	17 Divisions							24 Divisions	Offensive on the Eastern Front

=== Characteristics of the theater ===
In preparing for any future war in the Far East, Japanese (and Soviet) strategic planning was dominated by two fundamental geopolitical realities:

- Far Eastern Russia and the Mongolian People's Republic formed a horseshoe around Manchuria over a border more than 4500 km long.
- Far Eastern Russia was economically and militarily dependent on European Russia via the single Trans-Siberian Railroad.
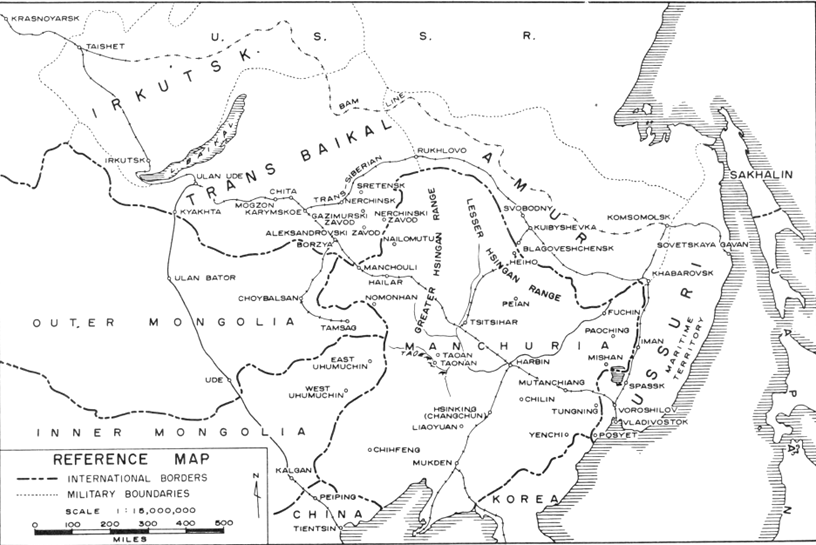
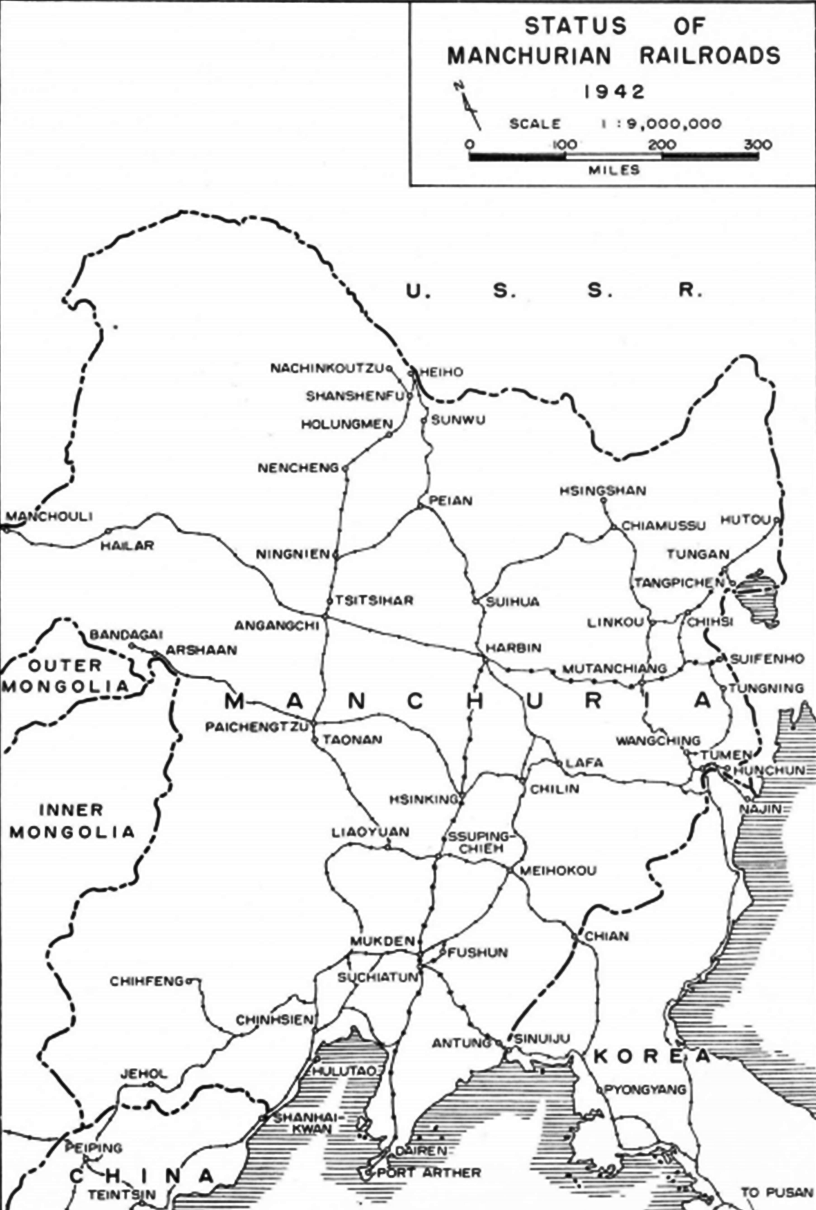
Reference maps of major railways in the Far East and Manchuria

That observation formed the basis of the vulnerability of Far Eastern Russia (FER) in a war against Japan. According to Japanese intelligence, FER's lack of self-sufficiency was exacerbated by the fact that a high proportion of its small population (about 6 million people in total) was concentrated in urban, rather than rural, environments, which created a deficiency in food production for both soldiers and civilians as well as a smaller pool of potential reservists. Despite the allocation of considerable resources to FER under Stalin's Second and Third Five Year Plans (1933–1942), serious shortcomings still remained. Although the Soviets traditionally relied on the Trans-Siberian Railway to send manpower, food, and raw materials eastward to overcome the major deficiencies (sometimes even by forcibly resettling discharged soldiers in Siberia), this created another problem since the limited capacity of that railroad also restricted the maximum size of any Red Army force that could be brought to bear on Japan, which the Japanese estimated to be the equivalent of 55 to 60 divisions.

Estimate of Economic Self-Sufficiency of Far Eastern Russia, 1945
Commodity	Requirement	Actual production	Self-sufficiency	Wartime reserves
Grain	1,390,000 tons	930,000 tons (excluding 200k tons for seed supply)	67%	800,000 tons
Petroleum	1,520,000 tons	1,000,000 tons	66%	1,300,000 tons
Steel	580,000 tons	220,000 tons	38%	Unknown
Coal	13,200,000 tons	13,200,000 tons	100%	Unknown

Estimate of monthly materiel output in Far Eastern Russia, 1945
Item	Number
Aircraft	400
Tanks	150
Armored cars	30
Artillery	550

Thus, any prolonged disruption of the Trans-Siberian Railway would ultimately prove fatal to FER and to any Soviet attempt to defend it, something that was well within Japanese capabilities as the tracks ran parallel to the frontier for thousands of kilometers and sometimes even came to within artillery range of the Manchurian border. Furthermore, though the encircling geography of the Soviet Union and Mongolia theoretically gave the Red Army an opportunity for a strategic envelopment of Manchuria, on the defensive the strung out Russian groupings would be vulnerable to isolation and piecemeal destruction. Although the Soviets made concerted efforts to address that vulnerability, such as beginning work on a 4,000 km extension of the Trans-Siberian Railway, the BAM Line, they alone were insufficient to rectify the basic weakness.

The limitations of the Trans-Siberian Railway and the remoteness of FER conferred both advantages and disadvantages to both sides. Although they prevented the Red Army from concentrating its full might against the Japanese and provided the latter with an effective means of isolating the region from European Russia, they also ensured that Japan alone could never administer a decisive defeat to the Soviet Union because the latter's main military and economic assets would remain unharmed. The IJA General Staff concluded that only an offensive on two fronts, in Europe and Asia, that was brought to bear on the Soviets' vital industrial centers and was aimed at collapsing its political will to resist would bringing about their destruction.

== Soviet response ==
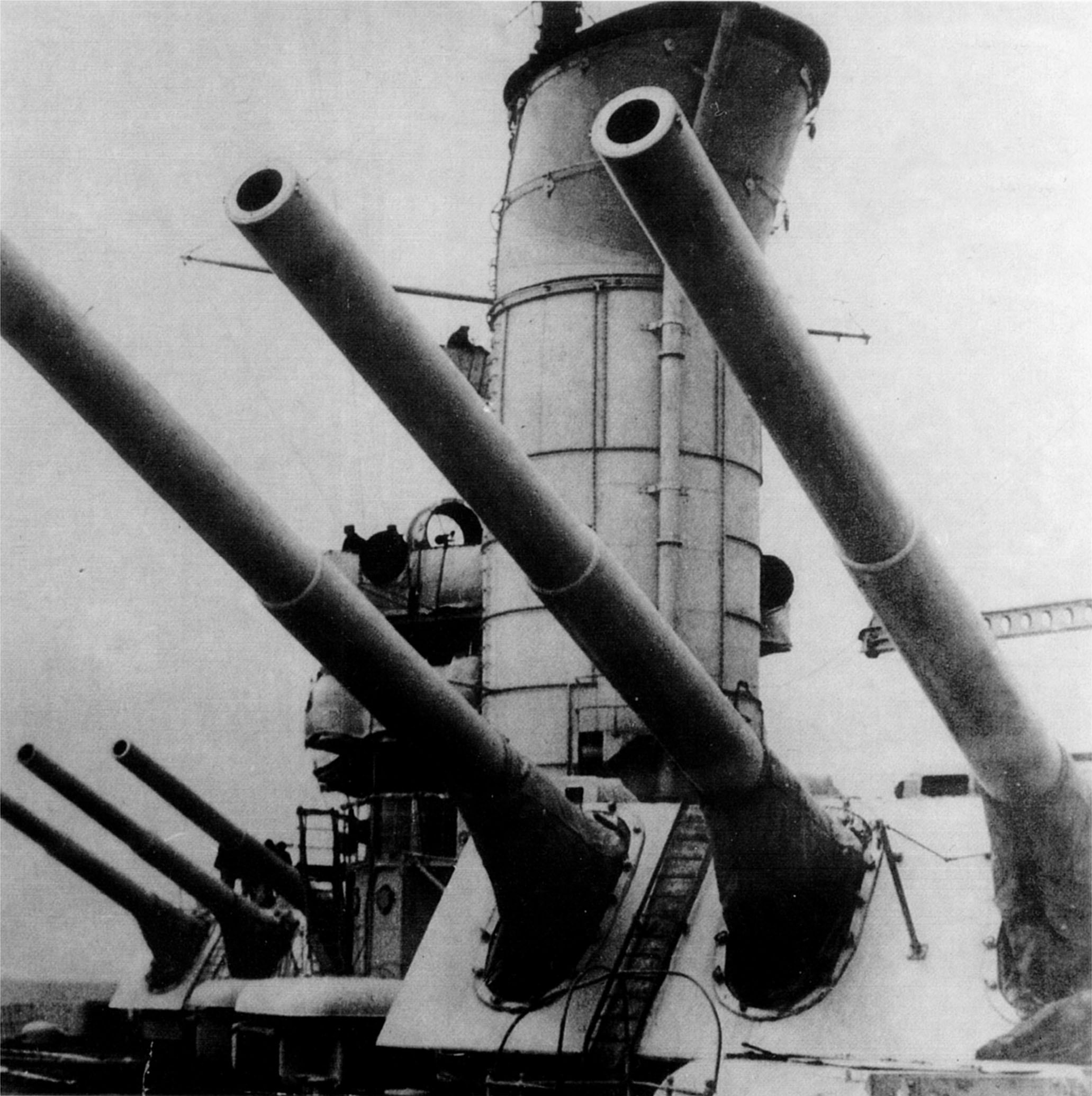
Two emplacements similar to these 12-inch (305 mm) guns of the Soviet battleship Parizhskaya Kommuna were erected to protect Vladivostok harbor in 1934.

The Soviet Union asserted that its military planning against Japan during the 1930s and early 1940s was defensive in nature, intended primarily to preserve its control over the Russian Far East and communist Mongolia. The means to that end, however, would not be completely passive. Even after the German invasion and well into 1942, Stavka advocated for an all-out defense of the border zone and heavy counterattacks all along the front, with the objective of preventing the IJA from seizing any Soviet territory and throwing it back into Manchuria. Although the aggressive language used by Boris Shaposhnikov in 1938 concerning "decisive action" in northern Manchuria after 45 days had by 1941 been moderated to simply "destroying the first echelon" of invaders and "creating a situation of stability," the Red Army never totally gave up limited offensive goals. The Japanese assessed that the lack of traversable terrain between the Manchurian border and the Pacific Ocean combined with the vulnerability of the Trans-Siberian Railway in the Amur and Primorye regions compelled them to take such a stance, despite investing considerable resources to fortify the area for defensive warfare.

The primary Red Army forces stationed in Soviet Far East in 1941 were the Far Eastern and Trans-Baikal Fronts, under the command of Generals Iosif Apanasenko and Mikhail Kovalyov, (Note: Assumed command from General P.A. Kurochkin in July 1941) respectively. The Trans-Baikal Front, with nine divisions (including two armored), a mechanized brigade, and a fortified region was tasked with defending the area west of the Oldoy River near Skovorodino, and the Far Eastern Front, with 23 divisions (including three armored), four brigades (excluding antiaircraft), and 11 fortified regions was responsible for the area east of it, including the crucial seaport of Vladivostok. The two fronts together accounted for some 650,000 men, 5,400 tanks, 3,000 aircraft, 57,000 motor vehicles, 15,000 artillery pieces, and 95,000 horses. The distribution of manpower and equipment in prewar FER was as follows:

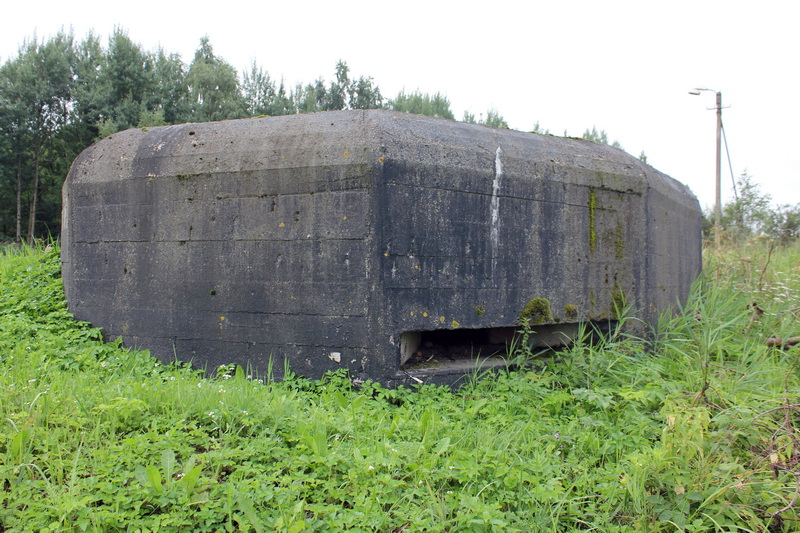
A Tochka (DOT), typical of those found in Soviet fortified regions during World War II

Manpower and Materiel under Administrative Control of TBMD and FEF, 1 June 1941

Resource	Far Eastern Front	Trans-Baikal MD	Total
Personnel	431,581	219,112	650,693 (Note: In addition, the Pacific Fleet numbered 117,258 personnel while the Amur River Flotilla numbered 9,857.)
Small Arms	713,821	314,658	1,028,389
Incl. Rifles	674,178	302,654	976,832
Incl. SMGs	11,502	1,762	13,264
Incl. LMG/HMGs	27,445	10,049	37,494
Incl. AA MGs	696	103	799
Motor Vehicles	28,865	28,644	57,329
Incl. Trucks	20,288	20,213	40,501
Tractors	8,101	2,443	10,544
Horses	83,596	11,011	94,607
Artillery	9,869	5,318	15,187
Incl. M1932/37 45mm AT	1,724	857	2,581
Incl. M1927 76mm rgtl. gun	359	342	701
Incl. M1902/30 76mm div. gun	290	399	689
Incl. M1936 76mm div. gun	96	0	96
Incl. M1939 76mm div. gun	152	172	324
Incl. M1909 76mm mtn. gun	356	0	356
Incl. M1910/30 107mm gun	95	80	175
Incl. M1931 122mm gun	168	36	204
Incl. M1910/30 122mm howitzer	678	408	1,086
Incl. M1909/30 152mm howitzer	600	162	762
Incl. M1937 152mm htzr/gun	239	125	364
Incl. M1938 152mm howitzer	0	36	36
Incl. M1931 203mm howitzer	71	24	95
Incl. M1937 82mm mortar	1,310	624	1,934
Incl. M1938 107mm mortar	138	15	153
Incl. M1938 120mm mortar	363	251	614
Incl. M1938/40 50mm mortar	2,651	1,398	4,049
Incl. M1931/38 76mm AA gun	547	341	888
Incl. M1939 AA autocannon	32	48	80
AFVs	3,812	3,451	7,263
Incl. T-27	276	134	410
Incl. T-27 chemical	17	0	17
Incl. T-37	187	263	450
Incl. T-37 radio	99	44	143
Incl. T-37 chemical	2	3	5
Incl. T-38	152	132	284
Incl. T-38 radio	3	14	17
Incl. T-26	955	268	1,223
Incl. T-26 two turret	149	156	305
Incl. T-26 radio	996	211	1,207
Incl. T-26-130	170	81	251
Incl. T-26 BKhM-3	12	19	31
Incl. T-26 engineer	9	0	9
Incl. T-26 tractor	10	47	57
Incl. SU-5	11	0	11
Incl. BT-2	2	11	13
Incl. BT-5	80	216	296
Incl. BT-5 radio	16	102	118
Incl. BT-7	202	488	690
Incl. BT-7 radio	137	469	606
Incl. BT-7 artillery	28	19	47
Incl. BA-20	18	125	143
Incl. BA-20 radio	18	121	139
Incl. FAI	122	104	226
Incl. BA-10	10	117	127
Incl. BA-10 radio	28	153	181
Incl. BA-6	74	47	121
Incl. BA-6 radio	8	23	31
Incl. BA-3	17	26	43
Incl. BAI	0	49	49
Incl. BA-27	4	9	13
Aircraft	1,950	1,071	3,021
Incl. DB-3	10	0	10
Incl. SB	607	380	987
Incl. TB-3	9	0	9
Incl. I-153	251	142	393
Incl. I-15	346	120	466
Incl. I-16	642	408	1,050
Incl. R-Zet	33	0	33
Incl. MBR-2	5	0	5
Incl. R-5	35	0	35
Incl. SSS	2	0	2
Incl. USB	10	21	31

By 1942, the Vladivostok Defense Sector also had some 150 artillery pieces of 75 mm to 356 mm caliber, which were organized into 50 batteries. Of these, the most numerous was the 130 mm B-13, which made up 20 batteries (90 guns). After the German invasion, Soviet forces in the Far East underwent a radical transformation. Even before the start of Operation Barbarossa, the Red Army began a steady transfer of men and materiel westward to Europe: prior to 22 June 1941, the above figures had already been reduced by five divisions, comprising 57,000 men, 670 artillery pieces, and 1,070 tanks, (Note: Forces transferred included two tank divisions, two rifle divisions, one motorized division, and two separate regiments.) while from 22 June to 1 December a further 2,209 tanks were sent to the front to stem the Nazi tide. Additionally, during the same period, 13 other divisions, (Note: July to November 1941) with 122,000 men, 2,000 guns and mortars, 1,500 tractors, and nearly 12,000 automobiles, were also detached from the Far East, along with a Japanese estimate of 1,800 aircraft. On the whole, between June 22, 1941, and May 9, 1945, a total of 344,676 men, 2,286 tanks, 4,757 guns and mortars, 11,903 motor vehicles, and 77,929 horses were removed from the Far Eastern and Trans-Baikal Fronts to bolster the desperate fighting against the Wehrmacht, the vast majority of whom arrived before early 1943.

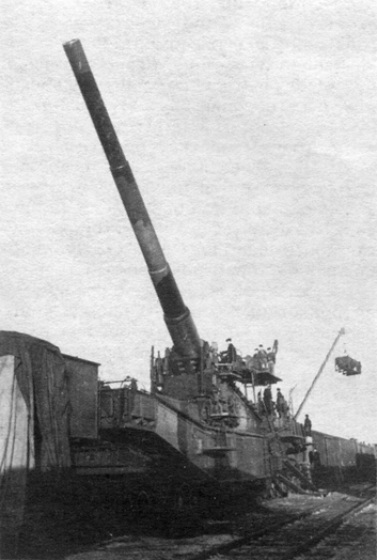
Soviet 14 inch (356 mm) TM-1-14 railway gun; three were installed at Vladivostok in 1933–1934.

In spite of a marked reduction in materiel power, the Soviets undertook herculean efforts to increase their troop levels in an expansion paralleling the massive Japanese buildup in Manchuria, which was easily tracked by Soviet and Chinese observers because of its sheer size. In accordance with the general mobilization ordered by the GKO on 22 July 1941, the combined strength of the Far Eastern and Trans-Baikal Fronts was to be raised to more than 1 million by 2 August. By 20 December, the actual manpower levels had totaled 1,161,202, of whom 1,129,630 were regular officers or enlisted men and the remainder were cadets or course attendees. Additionally, the number of horses increased from 94,607 to 139,150. The expansion of active personnel was achieved in spite of the Far East's limited population base through the addition of reservists from the Ural, Central Asian, and Siberian Military districts on top of those available locally. Furthermore, the standing strength of the NKVD and the Soviet Navy was also increased; between 22 June and 15 November 1941, Navy manpower in the Far East under Admiral Yumashev rose from 94,199, (Note: 84,324 Pacific Fleet and 9,857 Amur River Flotilla) to 169,029, (Note: 154,692 Pacific Fleet and 14,337 Amur River Flotilla) and the NKVD border troops (with a roster of just under 34,000 before the war) would, if the ratio held, have likewise increased their strength to over 60,000. Lastly there were the Mongolians, who despite their lack of heavy weaponry had earlier proved themselves against the Japanese at the Battles of Khalkhin Gol and would later go on to participate in the Soviet invasion of Manchuria in August 1945. They lacked the Soviets' experience and organization but numbered close to 80,000.

On the whole, if war had broken out in late August or early September 1941, the Soviets and Mongolians could have called on well over a million men from Mongolia to Sakhalin to confront the Japanese. About two thirds of those personnel (including virtually the entire navy) would have been on the Amur-Ussuri-Sakhalin Front, and the remainder would have defended Mongolia and the Trans-Baikal region. Equipment was split much more evenly between the two groupings. The Soviets could thus concentrate considerably greater military power east of Lake Baikal than either Japanese or American observers gave them credit for:

Japanese and U.S. Intelligence data on the strength of Soviet Army Forces east of Lake Baikal

Category/Source	Japanese Estimate, December 1940	Soviet Data, 22 June 1941	Japanese Estimate, 24 October 1941	U.S. Estimate, 21 October 1941	Japanese Estimate, December 1941 (Note: Includes NKVD personnel)	Soviet Data, 1 December 1941
Manpower	700,000	~650,000 (Note: Includes approximately 50,000 NKVD personnel; total 703,714 across all branches.)	N/A	682,000	600,000 to 800,000	~1,200,000 (Note: From General Chetverikov's notes, 12 December 1941. Includes approximately 50,000 NKVD personnel; total 1,343,307 across all branches.)
Aircraft	2,800	4,140	1,060	1,677	1,000	2,124
Tanks	2,400	3,188	1,200 to 1,400	1,600	1,000	3,193
Submarines/Warships (Note: "Submarines" in Japanese estimates, "Warships" in Soviet data.)	103	94	N/A	N/A	105	96

Even though the situation in Europe was dire, Soviet planners continued to adhere to essentially the same prewar concept for operations in FER and Manchuria, as articulated by Stavka Directive No. 170149 and 170150, which were sent to Generals Apanasenko and Kovalyov on 16 March 1942. Under this strategy, during the opening days of hostilities the Far Eastern Front (with its headquarters at Khabarovsk) together with the Pacific Fleet was ordered to conduct an all-out defense of the border; prevent the Japanese from entering Soviet territory; and hold Blagoveshchensk, Iman (Dalnerechensk) and the entirety of Primorye "at all costs." The main defensive effort was to be mounted by the 1st and 25th Armies (the former based at Vladivostok) on a north–south axis between the Pacific Ocean and Lake Khanka, while the 35th Army would dig in at Iman. To the north, the 15th and 2nd Red Banner Armies, based at Birobidzhan and Blagoveshchensk, would attempt to repel all Japanese assaults from the far bank of the powerful Amur River. Meanwhile, the Soviets would try to hold out on Sakhalin, Kamchatka, and the Pacific Coast, seeking to deny the Sea of Okhotsk to the IJN. To help aid that effort, the Red Army had for years undertaken a determined fortification program along the borders with Manchuria that involved the construction of hundreds of hardened fighting positions backed by trenches, referred to as "Tochkas" (points). There were three types of Tochkas, DOTs (permanent fire points), SOTs (disappearing fire points), and LOTs (dummy fire points). The most common form of DOT built by the Soviets in the Far East was hexagonal in shape, with an interior diameter of 5–6 m (16–20 ft) for the smaller bunkers and up to 10 m (33 ft) for larger ones. They protruded approximately 2 m (6.6 ft) above ground level, with the outer wall facing the front made of solid concrete 1 m (3.3 ft) or more thick. The backbone of the Soviet defenses, DOTs usually contained two or three machine guns; some were equipped with one or two 76 mm guns. The Soviets arranged their DOTs into belts: depending on the terrain, the strongpoints were spaced out over 400–600 m (440–660 yd) intervals and positioned in two to four rows 300–1,000 m (330–1,090 yd) deep from one another. According to Japanese intelligence, by late 1941 the Tochkas were distributed among 12 fortified regions as follows: (Note: Niehorster lists 12 fortified regions on 22 June 1941, 11 in the Far East Front (the 101st, 102nd, 103rd, 104th, 106th, 107th, 108th, 109th, 110th, 111th, and one unnamed) plus the Transbaikal fortified region in the west.)

Fortified regions in the Amur, Ussuri, and Trans-Baikal sectors

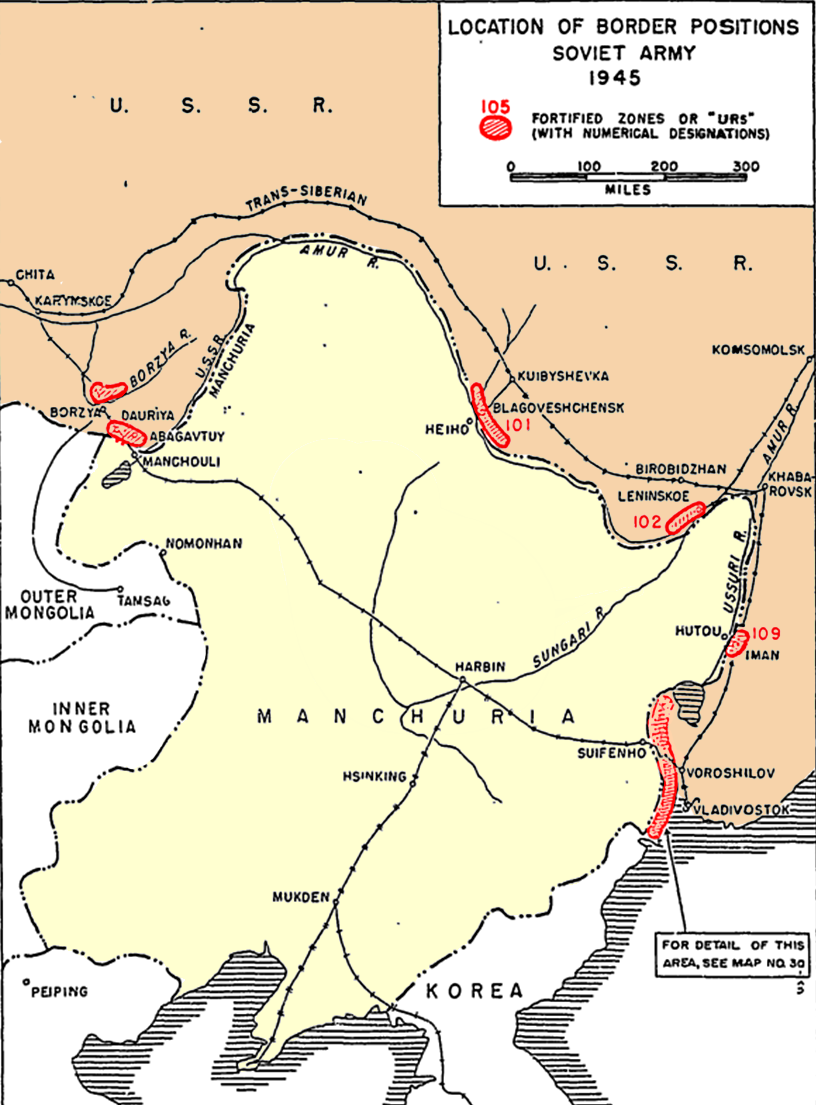
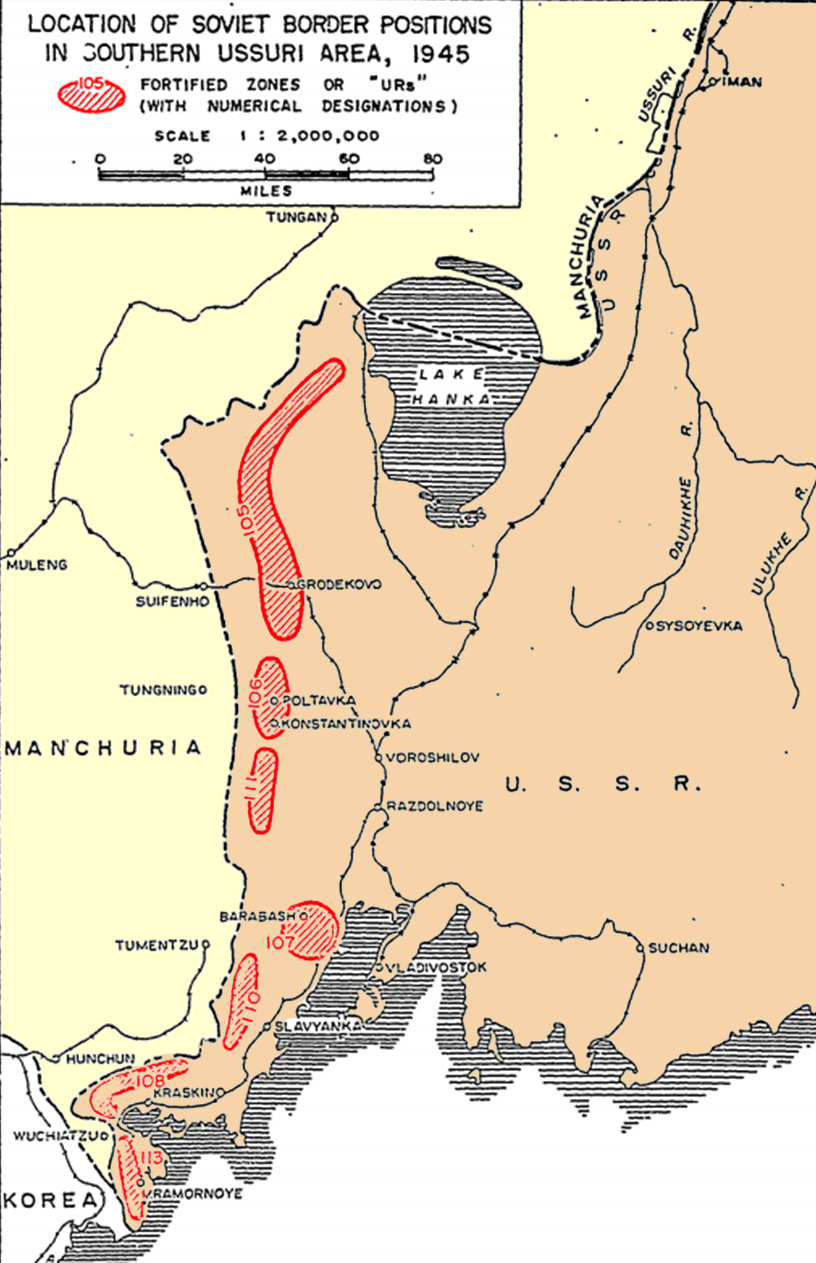
Map of Soviet fortified areas in the Far East and Ussuri region in particular, 1945

UR Name	HQ location	Frontage (km)	Depth (km)	Number of DOTs
No. 113	Chertovaya	35	2–7	125
No. 108	Kraskino	46	2–8	105
No. 110	Slavyanka	45	1–7	30
No. 107	Barabash	Unknown	Unknown	Unknown
No. 111	(No nearby town)	36	1–8	55
No. 106	Konstantinovka	35	2–8	155
No. 105	Grodekovo	50	2–12	255
No. 109	Iman	35	1–10	100
No. 102	Leninskoe	75	1–8	70
No. 101	Blagoveshchensk	110	1–7	326
Dauriya	Dauriya	65	2–5	170
Borzya	Borzya	unknown	unknown	approx. 1/sq. mile

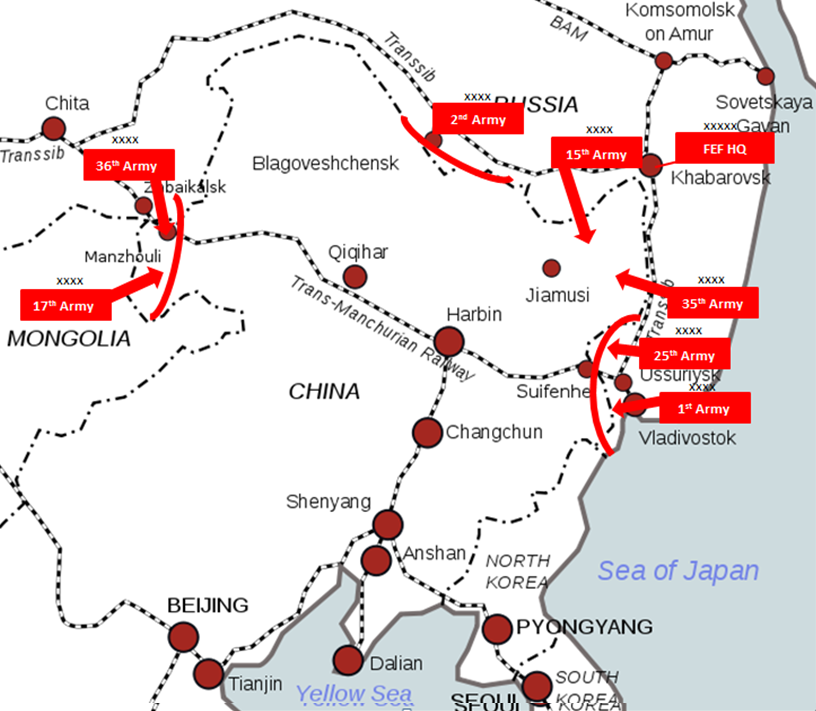
Outline of the Soviet operational plan in the event of war, early 1942

The Fortified Regions were well sited; since there were a limited number of roads crossing the hilly, forested frontier, the Soviets could be confident that each avenue of approach was covered by prepared defenses, which would have to be overcome via costly frontal attack and thus delay the enemy forces and make them pay heavily in manpower and equipment. To counter the Tochkas, the Japanese kept considerable quantities of heavy artillery near the border, ranging from more modern 240 mm and 305 mm howitzers to the antiquated 28 cm Howitzer L/10 from the Russo-Japanese War. As an added precaution, the IJA distributed a special one-ton shell with a range of only 1,000 m to its Type 7 30 cm Howitzers (Note: When firing normal shells, the Type 7 short-barreled variant had a range of 11,750 m, while the long-barreled version could fire out to 14,800 m.) meant to pulverize an enemy strongpoint in a single hit. Despite the advantages conferred by the border terrain and Tochka belt, the Red Army did not intend on solely hunkering down and outlasting a Japanese assault. By the fifth day of war, Stavka ordered the troops of the 15th and 35th Armies (minus the 66th Rifle Division), together with the Amur Red Banner Military Flotilla and any available reserves, to defeat the Japanese-Manchu units opposite them, force the Amur and Ussuri, and launch a counteroffensive coordinated against both sides of the Sungari River in Manchurian territory. The final objectives of the Sungari Front groups were designated as the cities of Fujin and Baoqing, which were to be reached on the 25th day of hostilities. The objectives of that attack were to stabilize the front and to relieve pressure on the Ussuri Railway and Khabarovsk areas.

Similarly, all along the front the remaining Soviet forces would begin short counterblows "in the tactical depth," in keeping with the Soviet doctrine that defensive action cannot be successful without the coordination of position defense and counterattack. Simultaneously, on the opposite side of Manchuria, the 17th and 36th Armies of the Trans-Baikal Front (with its headquarters at Mount Shirlova in the Yablonovy Range) were ordered to hold and counterattack after a period of three days and to advance to Lakes Buir and Hulun by the tenth day of the war. Undoubtedly, as a consequence of the Soviets' desperate situation at the time reinforcements from the hinterland were relatively small. Only four tank brigades, five artillery regiments, six guards mortar regiments, and five armored train battalions were allocated to both fronts put together.

With the aim of supporting the Red Army's struggle on the ground, the Soviet Air Force and Navy were also to have an active role in opposing the Japanese invasion. The foremost objective of the air force was the destruction of Japanese aircraft both in the air and on the ground, which was to be followed by tactical ground-attack missions against Japanese troops to assist the progress of the Sungari Offensive. Other objectives included the destruction of railways, bridges, and airfields in both Manchuria and Korea and the interception of both troop transports and warships in the Sea of Japan in coordination with the Pacific Fleet. Strategic bombing was to be limited to only 30 DB-3s, to be sent in groups of 8 to 10 aircraft against targets in Tokyo, Yokosuka, Maizuru, and Ominato. Concurrently, the Soviet Navy would immediately move to close the mouth of the Amur River, mine the Tatar Strait, and defend the Pacific Coast from any potential landing, which would free up the 25th Army in Primorye from coast defense duty. Submarine patrols would begin in the Yellow Sea, Sea of Okhotsk, and Sea of Japan with the aim of preventing the transport of troops from the Japanese Home Islands to the Asian Mainland and to disrupt their maritime communications. The Soviet submariners were ordered not to press operations against the eastern (Pacific) coast of Japan but to protect the eastern and northern shores of Sakhalin Island and Baykal Bay.

=== Combatants' strengths and weaknesses ===
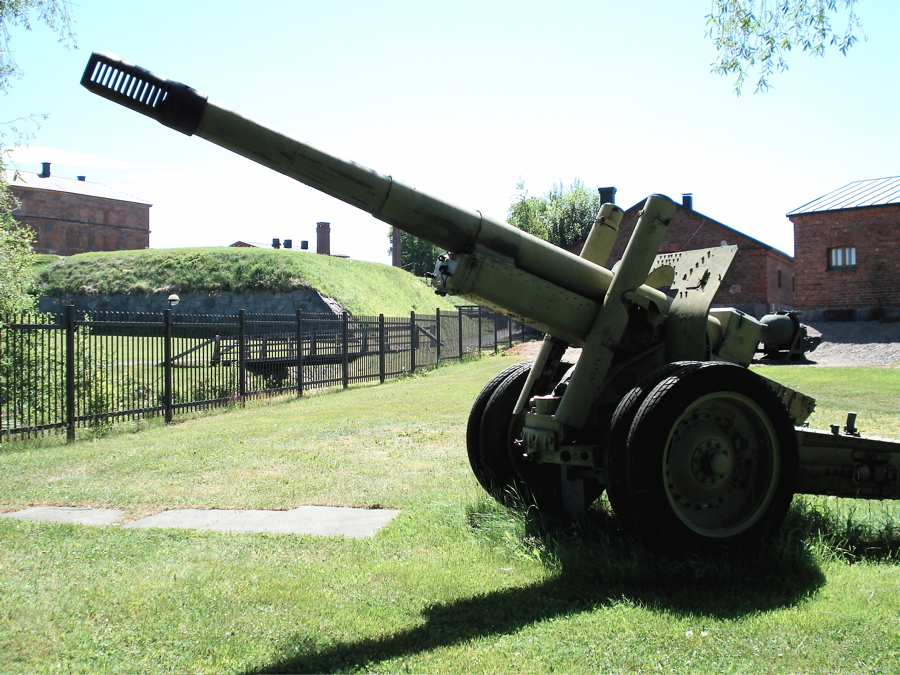
The ML-20 152 mm heavy howitzer-gun was capable of outranging most Japanese pieces and fired a shell weighing 43.6 kg.

Weaknesses in military industry would not have permitted the Japanese to fight an all-out modern land war for years on end. According to a study prepared just before the outbreak of the Pacific War, it was estimated that Japan's capacity to produce Army ground ordnance would reach a peak of 50 kaisenbun (Note: A kaisenbun consisted of 2.7 million rifle rounds, 2.8 million light machine gun rounds, 16,800 antitank rounds, 27,000 70-millimeter artillery rounds, 15,600 75-millimeter rounds (for regimental guns), and 48,000 75-millimeter rounds (for field and mountain guns).) during the 1942 fiscal year, or enough to sustain 50 divisions for four months. In reality, annual production never surpassed 25 kaisenbun, with only 19 being produced in 1941 on top of an Army reserve of 100; total expenditures during that year amounted to 11 kaisenbun. For operations against the Soviet Union, General Tanaka believed that a supply basis of 3 kaisenbun per division was necessary and so a total of 48 kaisenbun were assigned to the 16 divisions of the Kwantung and Korea Armies during the Kantokuen buildup. If the buildup proceeded to the 24-division level, it would have meant the Japanese were effectively gambling two thirds of their ammunition stockpile on the initial blow of an open-ended war that they admitted could not be won by force of arms alone. In stark contrast to this, although the Trans-Siberian Railway imposed a limit on the size of the force the Soviets could bring to battle at any one time, their military industry as a whole, supported by Western aid, was able to sustain a grinding four-year war against Germany to a victorious close. For its part, without a "second front" diverting the majority of Soviet resources to Europe, Japan would have been hard-pressed to supply its forces for more than two consecutive years.

In addition, although their then four-year war in China had provided the Japanese with a large amount of combat experience, much of it translated only obliquely to a campaign against the Soviets, who had a firmer understanding of concepts such as massed firepower and motor-based logistics. During the Nomonhan Incident, the IJA regarded distances of 100 km as "far" and 200 trucks as "many," but Zhukov's corps of over 4,000 vehicles supplied his Army Group on a 1,400 km round trip from the nearest railheads (Zhukov himself credited the logistics to his superior Grigory Shtern). Although both Japanese and Soviet infantry at Nomonhan were equipped with bolt-action rifles, mortars, and light automatic weapons, Japanese artillery often found itself outranged and undersupplied against the heavy Soviet guns. Even though Japanese counterfire managed to silence a number of Soviet batteries, the lack of range and shortage of ammunition left it at a distinct disadvantage against the Red Army.

To make up for its inferiority in numbers and limited material resources, the IJA relied on intangible factors such as fighting spirit and élan to overcome the foe, with mixed results. Although the Kwantung Army's state of supply improved substantially between 1939 and 1941, Japan's fundamental reliance on spirit to bring victory in battle never changed, sometimes at the expense of logical thinking and common sense. Often, fanatical adherence to tradition so impeded revisions to both doctrine and technology that those who spoke about the matter were accused of "faintheartedness" and "insulting the Imperial Army." Toward the end of the Pacific War, the pendulum began to swing in the opposite direction, with Japanese leaders grasping at wonder weapons such as the Nakajima Kikka jet fighter and a so-called "death ray" in the hope of reversing their fortunes.

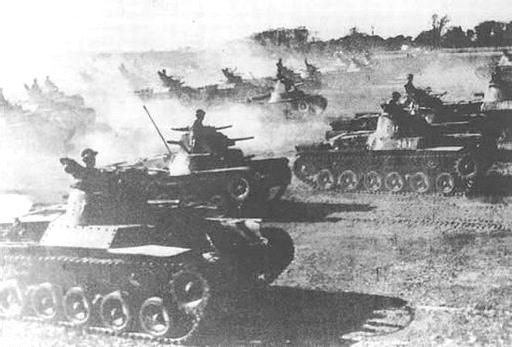
Chi-Has and Ha-Gos of the Chiba Tank School during exercises (1940)

Despite glaring Japanese weaknesses in the long run, the short-term situation was far less reassuring for the Soviets, who were hard-pressed by Germany's devastating advance in Europe. Although the Far Eastern and Trans-Baikal Fronts had a formidable array of weaponry, the desperate fighting in the west meant that strength was siphoned away by the week. The state of the remaining equipment was often mixed: prior to the 1941 transfers, some 660 tanks and 347 aircraft were inoperable because of repair needs or other causes. Because the Soviets had only a limited offensive capability on the Primorye and Trans-Baikal directions they were unlikely to have achieved a decisive victory during the initial stage of the fighting, even if they succeeded in slowing or stopping the Japanese. Furthermore, as pointed out by Soviet General Sergey Shtemenko after the war, attacking into the teeth of a prepared enemy was "the hardest kind of offensive," which required "overwhelming numbers and massive means of assault" to succeed, neither of which the Red Army had at the time.

The Soviets' position was further aggravated by the dispersal of their forces across a vast arc from Mongolia to Vladivostok. Without the ability to capitalize on that deployment by striking deep into Manchuria from multiple axes, their strength would be diluted and prone to piecemeal destruction at the hands of the Japanese, who could shift their forces from one front to another along interior lines. (Note: Organizationally, although Soviet forces amounted to some 32 division-equivalents by December 1941, they were regarded as only barely sufficient for defensive operations. Compared to a typical Japanese division, prewar Red Army units had slightly less manpower, but had greater access to long-range higher-caliber artillery. After the German invasion, the Red Army was reorganized, and each division had scarcely half the manpower and a fraction of the firepower of either its German or Japanese counterparts. Hence, to achieve superiority on the battlefield, the Soviets would have to concentrate several divisions to counter each of their enemy's.) On the other hand, the remoteness of the theater from European Russia meant that the Soviets were not in danger of sustaining a mortal blow unless there was either a political collapse or a German breakthrough on the main front.

Despite those difficulties the Red Army maintained its superiority in armored vehicles. Although the most modern tank available to the Kwantung Army in 1941, the Type 97 Chi-Ha, had thicker armor (up to 33 mm) than the Soviet BT and T-26, its low-velocity 57 mm gun was outmatched by the long-barreled 45 mm weapons mounted on the latter, and the Ha-Go and Te-Ke's 37 mm cannons had an effective range of less than 1 km. In general, the "handcrafted, beautifully polished" Japanese tanks were more survivable thanks to their diesel engines (the gasoline powerplants used by the Russians were especially fireprone), but their smaller numbers meant that each loss was more damaging to the IJA than each destroyed "crudely finished" "expendable" BT or T-26 was to the Red Army.

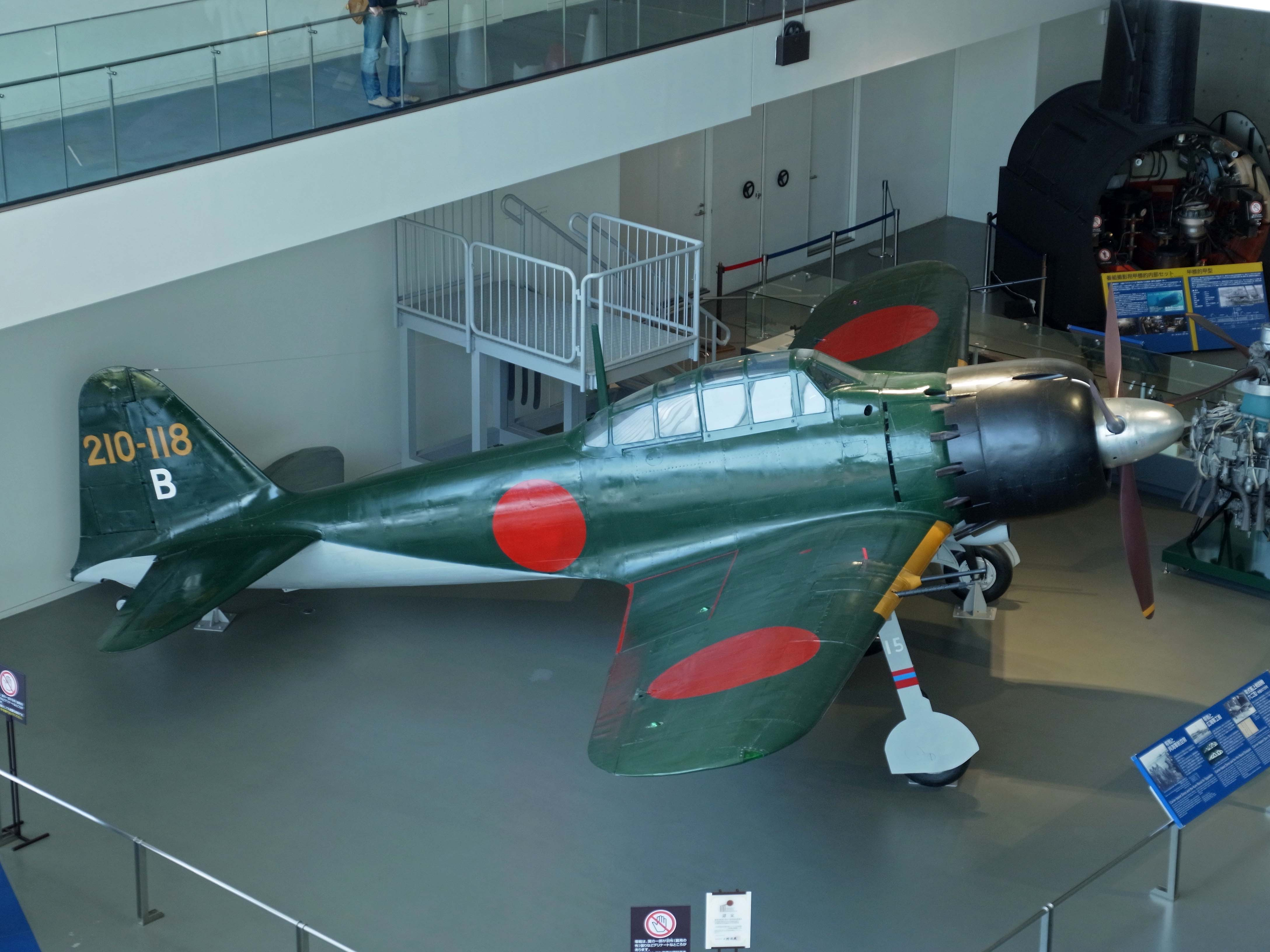
The IJN's Mitsubishi A6M "Zero" fighter was superior to anything in the Soviet inventory.

The situation in the air was reversed: even though the Polikarpov I-16, the best Soviet fighter plane in the theater, performed adequately against the Nakajima Ki-27 at Khalkhin Gol (Note: During the air war at Khalkhin Gol, both the Ki-27 and I-16 took about equal losses.) most other Red aircraft were considerably older. Furthermore, the Soviets had no answer to either the Mitsubishi A6M, which had been operating in China since 1940, or the high-speed Ki-21 bomber, which could fly faster and farther than its counterpart, the SB-2. Japanese pilots were also highly experienced, with IJNAS airmen averaging roughly 700 hours of flight time by late 1941 while IJAAF pilots averaged 500. Many of these fliers had already tasted combat against China or the VVS in previous battles. In comparison, German pilots received only about 230 hours of flying time and Soviet pilots even less.

Lastly, the quality of personnel in the respective armies cannot be ignored. As the Soviets drained their best and most well-trained divisions to fight in the west, their combat effectiveness in the east correspondingly diminished, which forced the Stavka to place increased emphasis on the fortified regions for defensive operations. Meanwhile, the opposing Kwantung Army was "the cream of the entire Japanese armed forces" and was receiving reinforcements by the day. Many of its units were elite Type A divisions, (Note: Permanent divisions (Ko-Shidan), initially numbered 1–20 with the exception of the 13th, 15th, 17th, 18th, and Imperial Guards. However, over the course of the war, other divisions were raised to either that or to A-1 (referred to as "strengthened (modified)" by the Americans) standard.) many of which had experience in China. Several officers who would go on to have notable careers in the Pacific War, including Tomoyuki Yamashita (head of the Kwantung Defense Command and later First Area Army), Isamu Yokoyama (1st Division, later 4th Army), Mitsuru Ushijima (11th Division), and Tadamichi Kuribayashi (1st Cavalry Brigade, Mongolia Garrison Army) held commands there.

== Conclusion ==
=== Fading support ===
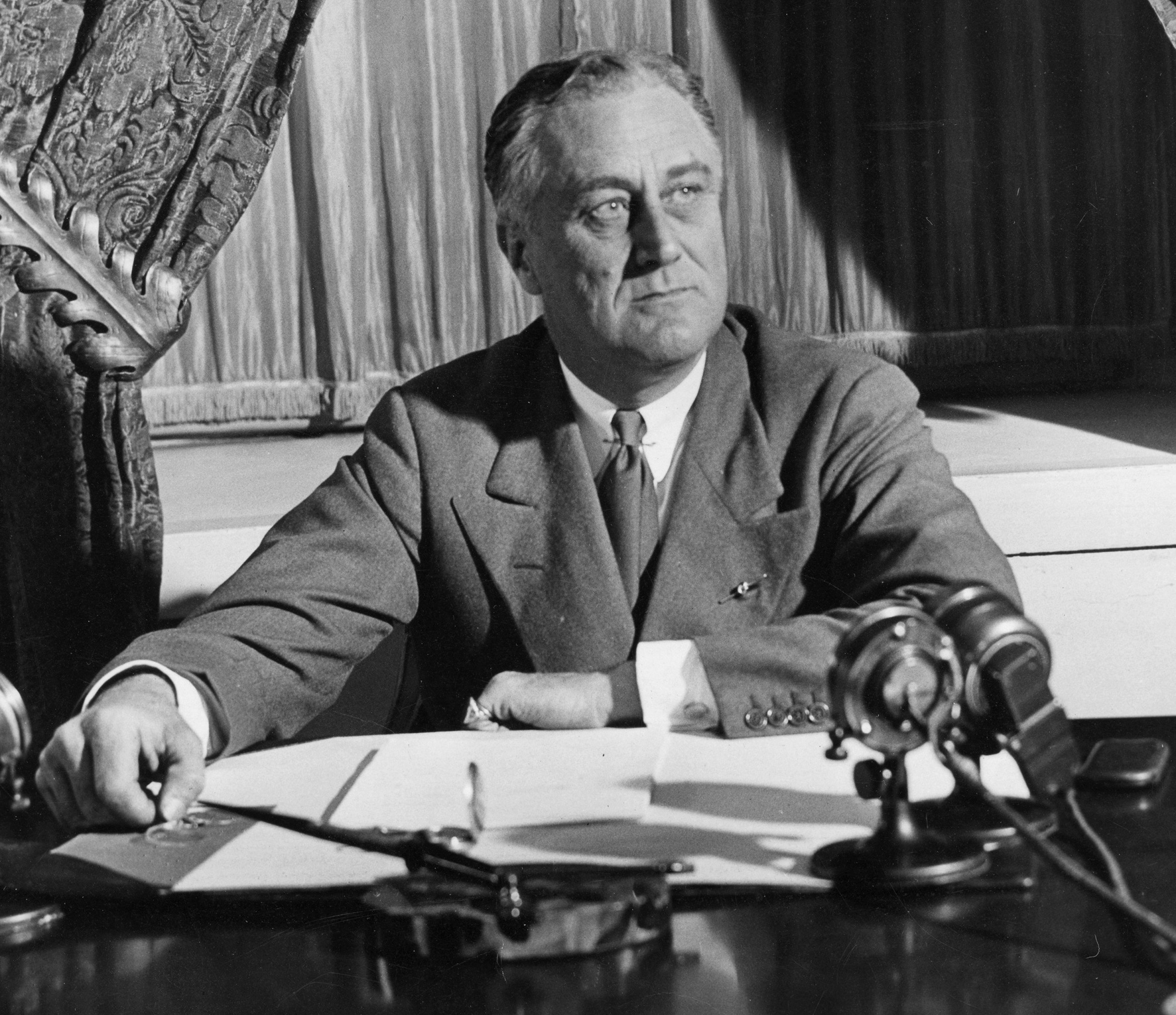
US President Franklin Roosevelt enacted a crippling series of sanctions on Japan that undermined its capacity for aggression.

The IJA designs against the Soviet Union did not exist in a vacuum. Even as the buildup for Kantokuen was underway, the war against China and the diplomatic standoff with the United States and its allies continued to drag on, which put Japanese strategic planners in a difficult position. By mid-July 1941, Foreign Minister Matsuoka's continued insistence for an immediate war against the Soviet Union ended in his dismissal and his replacement with Admiral Teijiro Tono, which dealt a blow to the "Strike North" faction. Further damaging the anti-Soviet cause was that although General Hideki Tojo and Emperor Hirohito both supported the reinforcement of Manchuria, as called for by the AGS, neither was ready to commit to hostilities. Hirohito, in particular, continued to express worry over the volatility of the Kwantung Army and the negative image that the "special maneuvers" created abroad. His concerns were not unfounded since as late as October 1941, Brigadier General Sherman Miles of the US Military Intelligence Division, apprehensive over the rapid increase of Japanese strength in Manchuria, recommended that the US to provide direct military aid to the Soviet and Chinese Armies in an effort to check Axis expansion and to keep the Soviet Union in the war against Germany.

The Japanese also increasingly faced a time crunch since the longer the decision to invade was postponed, the less time would be available before winter brought operations to a halt; later versions of Kantokuen were phrased in terms of overrunning Primorye "in 21 days," as opposed to the 6 to 8 weeks that had originally been envisioned or even the 35 days in the AGS "crash schedule." For their part, although Soviet transfers of equipment from east to west had been considerable, manpower levels remained high, nothing like the 50 percent reductions for which IJA planners had optimistically hoped. Nevertheless, despite the objections of General Shunroku Hata, who opposed the weakening of his China Expeditionary Army for the sake of Manchuria and of the incoming Korea Army commander Seishiro Itagaki, Chief of Staff Hajime Sugiyama still persuaded Hirohito to reaffirm his support for the buildup during an audience on 1 August. Events, however, had already begun to overtake them. In response to the Japanese occupation of key points in southern French Indochina on 24 July, US President Franklin Roosevelt, citing an "unlimited national emergency," issued an executive order freezing all of Japan's US assets and controlling all trade and monetary transactions involving Japanese interests. When Great Britain and the Dutch government-in-exile followed America's example, all trade was effectively blocked between Japan and those three nations.

Even more calamitous, on 1 August, the same day Sugiyama appeared before the Emperor, the United States further sanctioned Japan by enacting a total oil embargo. Since American exports accounted for 80% of Japan's oil supply and most of the rest came from the Dutch East Indies, which also refused to sell, the Japanese war machine was virtually cut off. (Note: According to the testimony of Masanobu Tsuji, the War Ministry estimated in August that if Japan pressed forward with an invasion of the Soviet Union under the conditions of the oil embargo, the IJA would run out of fuel within 6 to 12 months.) The oil embargo proved to be the final nail in the coffin for Kantokuen. Scarcely a week later, on 9 August 1941, the Army General Staff finally bowed to the War Ministry as plans for the seizure of the resource rich countries of Southeast Asia were given top priority. Grounded in "sheer opportunism," the IJA's cherished adventure in Siberia could never compete with the grim realities of national survival. In accordance with the agreement, the Kantokuen buildup was to be halted at only 16 divisions, which were to "stand guard" against any provocation, facilitate diplomacy with Stalin's government, or take advantage of a sudden collapse if the opportunity presented itself. All in all, reinforcements to Manchuria totaled 463,000 men, 210,000 horses, and 23,000 vehicles, which brought totals there to 763,000, 253,000, and 29,000, respectively. At the same time, the Korea Army was expanded by a further 55,000 men, 16,000 horses, and 650 vehicles. Throughout Northeast Asia, the total number of IJA personnel stationed in territories on the periphery of Soviet Russia numbered more than 1 million.

=== "Go South" triumphant ===
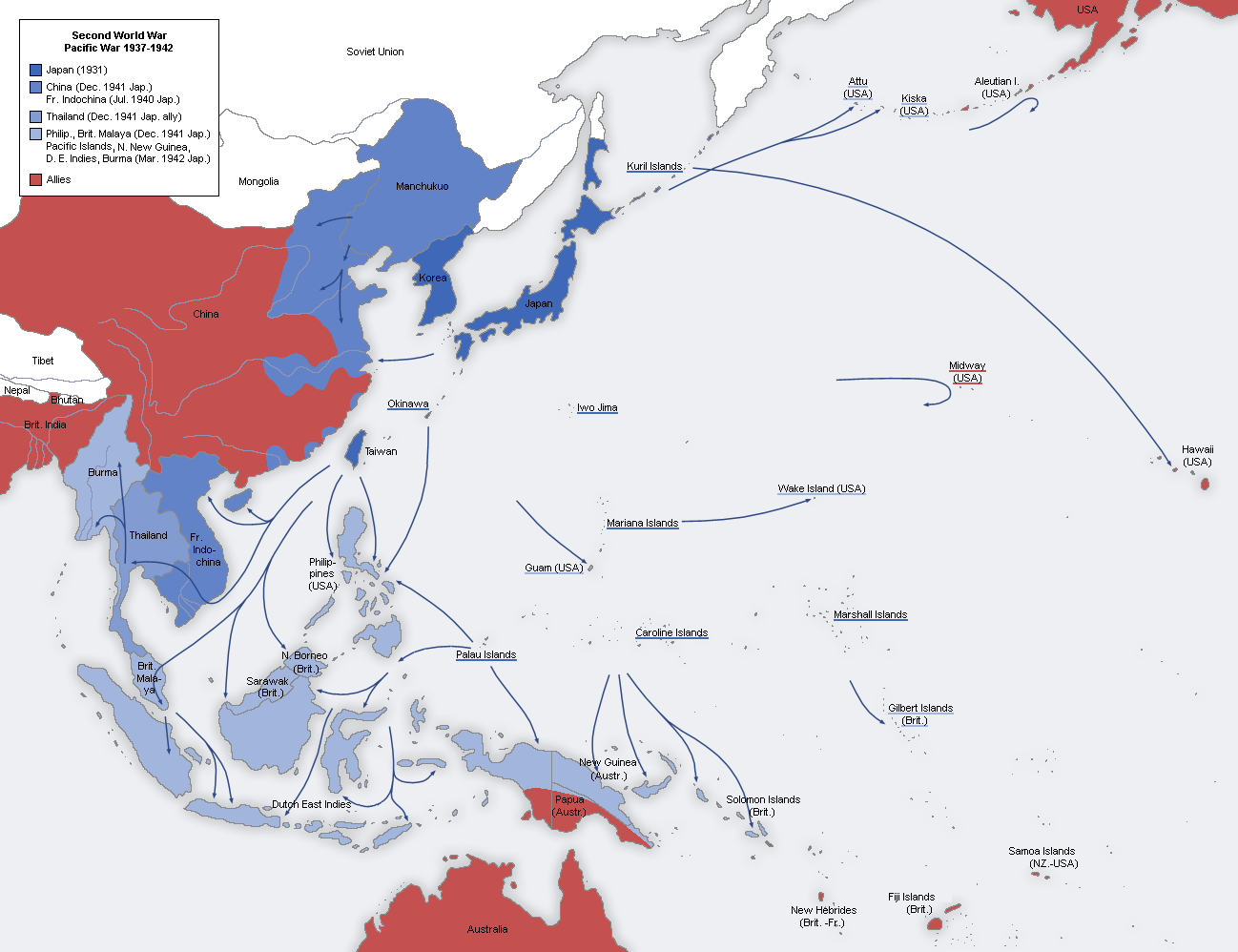
Japanese expansion in Asia and the Pacific, 1937–1942

With Kantokuen terminated halfway and Japan plunging toward self-destruction in the Pacific, the Kwantung Army found itself in the midst of a 180-degree turn in national policy. As a harbinger of things to come, the 51st Division was actually withdrawn in September to join the 23rd Army in China, which left a total of 710,000 men remaining in Manchuria. In the face of this, Kwantung Army still clung to the hope of a "golden opportunity" for an attack on the Soviet Union and continued operational preparations while examining the possibility of an offensive northward before the spring thaw of 1942. Although the logistical difficulties of such a move were quickly comprehended, hardliners in the Operations Division refused to hear it. When a logistics colonel complained to the Army General Staff that the Kwantung Army lacked the proper billeting to endure the bitter winter cold near the Siberian frontiers, General Tanaka became infuriated, yelled at the colonel not to say such "nonsensical things," and slapped him. In the aftermath of that episode, common sense prevailed, and the Kwantung Army withdrew from the borders to wait out the winter. Additionally, a further 88,000 men were transferred out of Manchuria to join the impending campaign to the South, which again decreased theater strength to 620,000 men.

When Japan finally struck the Allies and launched its multistage invasion of Southeast Asia in December 1941, the weakened Kwantung Army played only a limited role. Even though most of the units dispatched south were considered to be only "temporary loans," the timing of their return would hinge on the outcome of operations there. In the meantime, Kwantung Army was ordered to ensure the security of Manchuria and to avoid conflict with the Soviet Union, which was itself hard-pressed as German troops neared Moscow.

After the initial phase of the Southern Offensive was brought to a close in the spring of 1942, IGHQ, conscious of the Kwantung Army's weakened state and hoping to make the most of an increased war budget, decided to reorganize and strengthen its troops in Manchuria. The rejuvenation of combat power in the north, while bringing the Kwantung Army closer to its goal from an organizational standpoint, still did not reflect an intention to go to war against the Soviets. Indeed, logistics specialists were convinced that a full year would be needed to repair the damages of the earlier redeployments and to raise capabilities to the level where a serious offensive could be undertaken. Nevertheless, it was then that Kwantung Army reached the zenith of its military power, with 700,000 men, 900 tanks, and 900 aircraft in Manchuria alone. Soviet intelligence credited the Japanese with a maximum of 1,100,000 men and 1,500 aircraft in 16 divisions, two brigades, and 23 garrison units; Korea Army added another 120,000 personnel to that figure. Though the Kwantung Army briefly benefited from this momentary "pivot" to the north, the changing tide of the war in the Pacific would soon permanently force Japan's attention southward. Over the next three years, Kwantung Army would go on to oversee an "exodus" of combat units from Manchuria and set in motion a terminal decline that would eventually spell its demise.

=== End of the Kwantung Army ===
With the Allied counteroffensive in the Pacific both larger and earlier than expected, the Japanese found that their forces there were insufficient to contain its momentum. The lack of a real strategic reserve in the Home Islands forced the IJA to divert troops from the Asian mainland to bolster the Empire's crumbling frontiers. After the 20th, 41st, 52nd, 51st, 32nd, 35th, and 43rd (Note: The last four were largely destroyed en route by US sea and air power.) divisions were withdrawn from China and Korea, Japan could count only on the Kwantung Army, the last major grouping not actively involved in combat operations, as a pool of ready manpower. Although minor redeployments from Manchuria had started as early as 1943, the first wholesale movement of divisions began in February 1944 with the transfer of the 14th and 29th Divisions to Guam and Palau, where they would later be annihilated in battle.

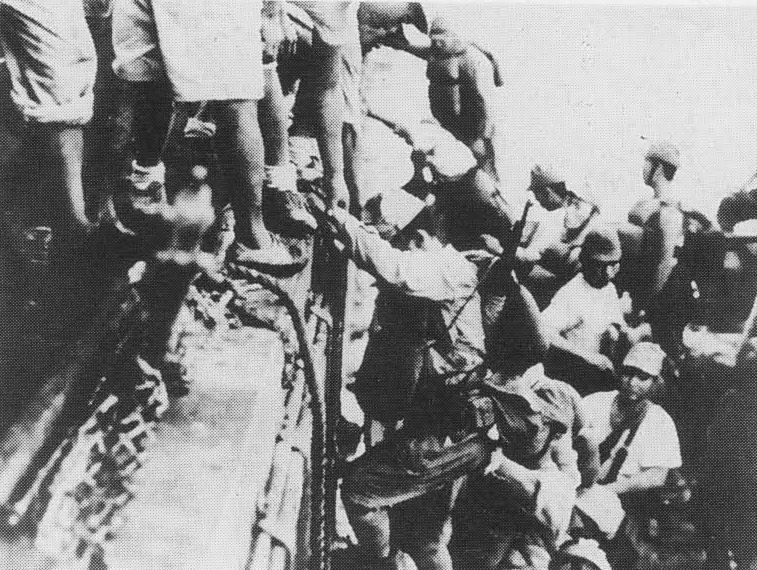
Japanese soldiers on the "Tokyo Express" in the Solomons, 1942

When the US, having bypassed the fortress atoll of Truk, decided to strike directly against the Marianas and decisively defeated the IJN's counterattack in the Battle of the Philippine Sea, the inner perimeter of the Japanese Empire became threatened. Having done little to strengthen its reserves, IGHQ in June and July 1944 sent seven divisions, the 1st, 8th, 10th, 24th, 9th, 28th, and 2nd Armored, into the fray, joined by an eighth, the 23rd (veterans of the Khalkhin Gol fighting in 1939), in October. Of the above, all except the 9th, bypassed on Formosa, and the 28th, on Miyako Jima, avoided being devastated by battle, starvation, and disease during the brutal combat in the Philippines and Okinawa. The decision to reinforce Formosa was of particular consequence for Japan. Recognizing that island's strategic importance with regard to the flow of vital raw materials to the mainland, Tokyo resolved to prevent it from falling into Allied hands at all costs. Thus, in December 1944 and January 1945, the 12th and 71st Divisions were ordered there from Manchuria to reinforce the two-division garrison that had recently been augmented by the Kwantung 9th Division that arrived via Okinawa. The loss of the 9th Division was seen as nothing less than a body blow for Okinawa's 32nd Army commander, Lieutenant General Mitsuru Ushijima, who warned: "If the 9th Division is detached and transferred, I cannot fulfil my duty of defending this island." In the end, because of the American island-hopping strategy, none of the five divisions (including three from the Kwantung Army) ever fired a shot against an American invasion and were left to wither on the vine.

Even before the loss of the 71st Division in January 1945, Kwantung Army had found itself reduced to a paltry 460,000 men in just nine remaining divisions. Not a single division was left to defend Korea, and there were only 120 operable aircraft in all of Manchuria. Worse still, the divisions that stayed behind were effectively ruined by transfers of men and equipment: some infantry companies were left with only one or two officers, and entire artillery regiments completely lacked guns. Although the Kwantung Army held few illusions about its miserable state of affairs (its own "exhaustive studies" concluded that it had been weakened "far beyond estimation" and that new divisions formed to counterbalance the withdrawals possessed only a "fraction" of the fighting power of the originals), senior leaders continued to rationalize. In an audience with Hirohito on February 26, Tojo attempted to placate the Emperor by noting that the Soviets had done exactly the same thing, and he asserted that the strength of the Soviet Far East forces and the Kwantung Army was "in balance." The next month, with the American juggernaut at last nearing the Home Islands and with none of the multitude of new formations hastily raised in their defense to be fully prepared until summer, the Kwantung Army was called on yet again as the 11th, 25th, 57th, and 1st Armored Divisions were recalled to Japan; the 111th, 120th, and 121st Divisions were sent to southern Korea to pre-empt a possible Allied incursion. This "hemorrhage" of equipment and manpower from what was once the most prestigious force in the Japanese Army stopped only on 5 April 1945, when the Soviet Union announced that it would not renew its Soviet–Japanese Neutrality Pact.

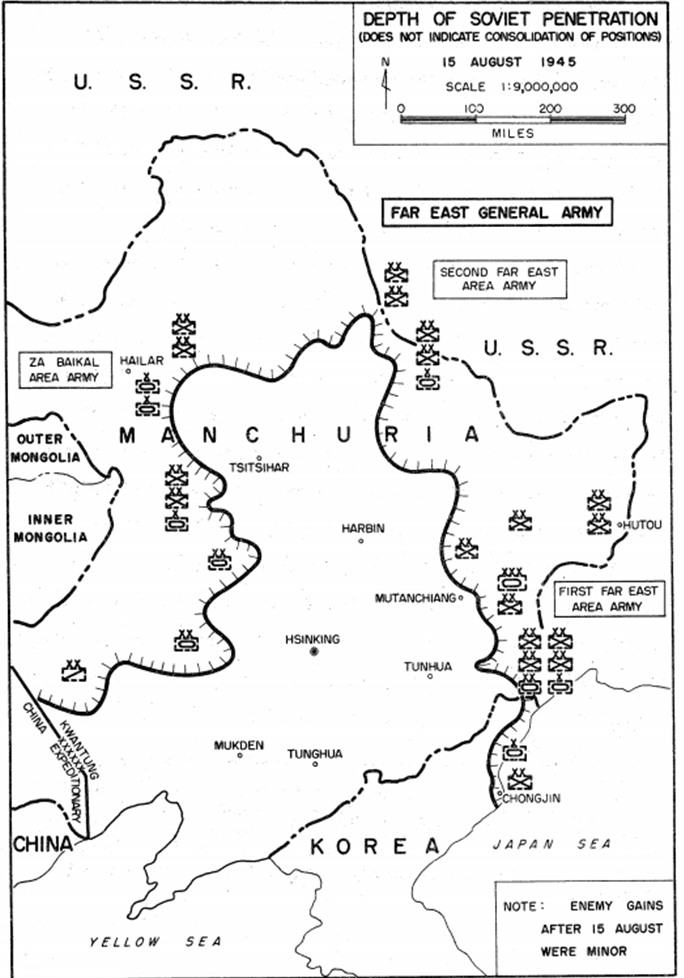
Depth of Soviet penetration into Manchuria as of 15 August 1945 (Credit: JM-154, 1954.)

As the Kwantung Army's fighting power diminished, it had to amend its operational plans against the Soviets accordingly. While the strategy for 1942 was the same as it had been in 1941, that had been abandoned by 1943 favor of only one attack on the Eastern Front against Primorye or in the north against Blagoveshchensk, which itself soon gave way to a holding action on all fronts to attempt to check the Red Army, which was now expected to take the offensive, at the borders. As the Kwantung Army continued to weaken, it became apparent that even that would be too much and so a final operational plan was adopted on 30 May 1945 for the IJA to only delay the Soviet advance in the border zones and to make a fighting retreat to fortifications near the Korean border, centered on the city of Tonghua. That move in effect surrendered the majority of Manchuria to the opponent as a matter of course. Although by August 1945, Kwantung Army manpower had been boosted to 714,000 in 24 divisions and 12 brigades by the exhaustion of local reserves, cannibalization of guards units, and transfers from China, its officers and men were privately in despair. Most of the new formations, staffed by the old, the infirm, civil servants, colonists, and students, were at barely 15% combat-effectiveness and heavily lacking in weapons; out of 230 serviceable combat planes, only 55 could be considered modern. It was even briefly recommended for Army Headquarters to be pre-emptively evacuated from Changchun, but that was rejected on security, political, and psychological grounds. After the war, colonel Saburo Hayashi admitted, "We wanted to provide a show of force. If the Russians only knew the weakness of our preparations in Manchuria, they were bound to attack us."

Simultaneously, Japanese intelligence watched helplessly as Soviet strength opposite them began to soar. Honoring his promise at Yalta to enter the war in the Pacific within three months of Germany's defeat, Joseph Stalin ordered the transfer from Europe to the Far East of some 403,355 troops, along with 2,119 tanks and assault guns, 7,137 guns and mortars, 17,374 trucks, and 36,280 horses. These men and their commanders were specially picked because of their past experience in dealing with certain types of terrain and opposition during the war against Germany that would be beneficial for the approaching campaign. By early August, the IJA pegged Red Army forces in Siberia at 1,600,000, with 4,500 tanks and 6,500 aircraft in 47 division-equivalents; the actual totals were 1,577,725, 3,704, and 3,446, respectively. (Note: Figures are for RKKA only; including the Navy and adding self-propelled guns to the "tanks" total, the grand total was 1,747,465 personnel, 5,250 tanks and SPGs, and 5,171 aircraft.)

The Soviets were very deliberate in their preparations: to prevent the Japanese from shifting forces to block an attack on a single front, it was determined that only an all-axes surprise offensive would be sufficient to surround the Kwantung Army before it had a chance to withdraw into the depths of China or Korea. Aware that the Japanese knew the limited capacity of the Trans-Siberian Railway would mean that preparations for an invasion would not be ready until autumn and that weather conditions would also be rather unfavorable before then, Soviet planners enlisted the help of the Allies to deliver additional supplies to facilitate an earlier offensive. Therefore, the Japanese were caught unprepared when hostilities began in August. Despite the impending catastrophe facing Japan on all fronts, the Kwantung Army commander, General Yamada, and his top leadership, continued to live "in a fool's paradise." Even after the atomic bombing of Hiroshima on 6 August, there was no sense of crisis, and special war games (expected to last for five days and attended by a number of high-ranking officers) were conducted near the borders, with Yamada flying to Dairen to dedicate a shrine. Therefore, Army Headquarters was taken by complete surprise when the Soviets launched their general offensive at midnight on August 8/9 1945.

The Japanese offered vicious resistance when they were allowed to stand and fight, such as at Mutanchiang, but almost without exception they were overwhelmed and pushed back from the front. After just about a week of combat, reacting to the Soviet declaration of war and the second nuclear strike on Nagasaki, Hirohito overrode his military and ordered the surrender of Japan to the Allies in accordance with the Potsdam Declaration. After some clarifications and a second rescript reaffirming Japan's surrender, General Yamada and his staff abandoned the plan to withdraw to Tonghua even though his command was still mostly intact. The Kwantung Army officially laid down its arms on 17 August 1945 with some sporadic clashes persisting until the end of the month; (Note: Contrary to popular opinion, the Kwantung Army still possessed considerable fighting power. By the end of the war the IJA had about 664,000 men in Manchuria and 294,200 in Korea; the USMC Official History noted of the matter, "Although the Kwantung Army reeled back from Soviet blows, most of its units were still intact and it was hardly ready to be counted out of the fight. The Japanese Emperor's Imperial Rescript which ordered his troops to lay down their arms was the only thing which prevented a protracted and costly battle.") the final casualties on both sides numbered 12,031 killed and 24,425 wounded for the Soviets and 21,389 killed and about 20,000 wounded for the Japanese. (Note: Two days after the Kwantung Army's surrender on 19 August, the total number of prisoners in Soviet custody numbered 41,199.) In the end, as Foreign Minister Shigemitsu signed the unconditional surrender of Japan aboard USS Missouri in Tokyo Bay, the men of the vaunted Kantogun, having once dreamed of riding into Siberia as conquerors, instead found themselves trudging there as prisoners of war.

== Appendix: battle composition of opposing forces ==
The below tables depict the Soviet and Japanese Army forces in Northeast Asia as they were in September 1941, as well as the composition of the Soviet Army at the time of Stavka directives 170149 and 170150 (16 March 1942). Non-combat units, such as signals, medical, veterinary, etc. are omitted from both sides.

Soviet Far East Army Battle Composition, 1 September 1941
Transbaikal Military District	Rifle, Airborne Forces, and Cavalry	Corps and Army Artillery, High Command Reserve Artillery, and Air Defense Forces	Armored and Mechanized Forces	Air Forces	Engineering Troops
17th Army	36th, 57th, 82nd Motor Rifle Divisions	185th Cannon Artillery Regiment (RVGK), 2nd Air Defense Area Brigade	61st Tank Division, 9th Motorized Armored Brigade, 9th Motorcycle Regiment	-	82nd Rolled Beam Bridge
36th Army	65th, 93rd, 94th, 114th Rifle Divisions, 51st Cavalry Division, 31st, 32nd Fortified Regions	267th, 390th Corps Artillery Regiments, 14th Separate Mortar Battalion, 1st Air Defense Area Brigade	111th Tank Division, 33rd, 35th Separate Tank Battalions	-	39th Separate Sapper Battalion
Directly Subordinate	-	106th, 216th, 413th Howitzer Artillery Regiments (RVGK), 13th Separate Mortar Battalion, 3rd Air Defense Area Brigade	-	37th Mixed Aviation Division, 2nd Mixed Aviation Brigade, 318th Reconnaissance Aviation Regiment	51st, 102nd Separate Engineer Battalions, 1st, 15th Pontoon Bridge Battalions
Subtotal	7 Rifle Divisions 1 Cavalry Division 2 Fortified Regions	6 Artillery Regiments 2 Separate Mortar Battalions 3 Air Defense Area Brigades	2 Tank Divisions 1 Motorized Armored Brigade 2 Separate Tank Battalions 1 Motorcycle Regiment	1 Mixed Aviation Division 1 Mixed Aviation Brigade 1 Reconnaissance Aviation Regiment	5 Separate Engineer Battalions 1 Separate Sapper Battalion
Far Eastern Front	Rifle, Airborne Forces, and Cavalry	Corps and Army Artillery, High Command Reserve Artillery, and Air Defense Forces	Armored and Mechanized Forces	Air Forces	Engineering Troops
1st Army	26th, 59th Rifle Corps, 22nd, 39th, 59th, 239th Rifle Divisions, 8th Cavalry Division, 6th Rifle Brigade, 105th Fortified Region	165th, 199th Howitzer Artillery Regiments (RVGK), 50th, 273rd Corps Artillery Regiments, 115th, 129th Separate AA Battalions, 4th Air Defense Area Brigade	58th, 112th Tank Divisions, 3rd Separate Armored Train Battalion	33rd Bomber Aviation Division, 32nd, 34th, 83rd Mixed Aviation Division, 26th, 59th Corrective Aviation Squadrons, 137th Reconnaissance Aviation Squadron	29th Separate Engineer Battalion
2nd Army	3rd, 12th, and "Svobodnenskaya" Rifle Divisions, 101st and "Ust' - Bureyskiy" Fortified Regions	42nd Corps Artillery Regiment, 114th, 411th, and 550th Howitzer Artillery Regiments, 22nd Separate Mortar Battalion, 1st Air Defense Area Brigade	301st, 356th, 362nd Separate Tank Battalions, 2nd Separate Armored Train Battalion, 5th Separate Armored Car Battalion	95th Fighter Aviation Division, 82nd Bomber Aviation Division	2nd Heavy Pontoon Bridge Regiment, 10th, 29th Pontoon Bridge Battalions
15th Army	34th Rifle Division, 202nd Airborne Brigade, 102nd Fortified Region	52nd Corps Artillery Regiment, 2nd Air Defense Area Brigade	60th Tank Division	69th Mixed Aviation Division, 251st Airborne Bomber Aviation Division, 140th Reconnaissance Aviation Squadron	3rd Heavy Pontoon Bridge Regiment, 11th, 23rd, 24th Pontoon Bridge Battalions, 129th Separate Sapper Battalion
25th Army	39th Rifle Corps, 32nd, 40th, 92nd, 105th Rifle Divisions, 2nd Rifle Brigade, Separate Cavalry Regiment, 106th, 107th, 108th, 110th, 111th, Fortified Regions	282nd, 548 Corps Artillery Regiments, 215th, 386th, 549th Howitzer Artillery Regiments (RVGK), 21st Separate Mortar Battalion, 5th Air Defense Area Brigade	9th Separate Armored Train Battalion	70th Mixed Aviation Division, 39th Corrective Aviation Squadron, 138th Reconnaissance Aviation Squadron	32nd Separate Engineer Battalion, 100th Motorized Engineer Battalion, 69th Separate Sapper Battalion
35th Army	35th, 66th, 78th Rifle Divisions, 109th Fortified Region	76th, 187th Corps Artillery Regiments, 362nd, 367th Separate Artillery Battalions, 110th Separate AA Battalion, 3rd Air Defense Area Brigade	29th Motorcycle Regiment, Separate Armored Train Battalion	79th Fighter Aviation Division, 18th Reconnaissance Aviation Squadron	402nd Motorized Engineer Battalion, 3rd, 9th, 20th, Motorized Pontoon Bridge Battalions, 60th Separate Sapper Battalion
Directly Subordinate	Special Rifle Corps (79th Rifle Division - Sakhalin Island, "Sakhalinskaya" Rifle Brigade - Sakhalin Island, 101st Mountain Rifle Division - Petropavlovsk-Kamchatskiy), 103rd, 104th Fortified Regions	181st, 372nd Howitzer Artillery Regiments (RVGK), 5th AA Brigade, 6th Air Defense Area Brigade, Kamchatka and Sakhalin Air Defense Sectors	-	29th Fighter Aviation Division, 53rd Bomber Aviation Division, 5th Mixed Aviation Brigade, 139th Bomber Aviation Regiment, 71st Mixed Aviation Regiment, 168th Reconnaissance Aviation Regiment	26th Separate Engineer Battalion, 101st Motorized Engineer Battalion
Subtotal	4 Rifle Corps 17 Rifle Divisions 1 Cavalry Division 3 Rifle Brigades 1 Airborne Brigade 1 Cavalry Regiment 12 Fortified Regions	18 Artillery Regiments 2 Separate Artillery Battalions 2 Separate Mortar Battalions 1 AA Brigade 6 Air Defense Area Brigades 2 Air Defense Sectors 3 Separate AA Battalions	3 Tank Divisions 1 Motorcycle Regiment 3 Separate Tank Battalions 4 Armored Train Battalions 1 Armored Car Battalion	3 Fighter Aviation Divisions 5 Mixed Aviation Divisions 3 Bomber Aviation Divisions 1 Mixed Aviation Brigade 2 Bomber Aviation Regiments 1 Mixed Aviation Regiment 1 Reconnaissance Aviation Regiment	2 Engineer Regiments 14 Separate Engineer Battalions 3 Separate Sapper Battalions
Total Far East and Transbaikal Military District	4 Rifle Corps 24 Rifle Divisions 2 Cavalry Divisions 3 Rifle Brigades 1 Airborne Brigade 1 Cavalry Regiment 14 Fortified Regions	24 Artillery Regiments 2 Separate Artillery Battalions 4 Separate Mortar Battalions 1 AA Brigade 9 Air Defense Area Brigades 2 Air Defense Sectors 3 Separate AA Battalions	5 Tank Divisions 1 Motorized Armored Brigade 5 Separate Tank Battalions 2 Motorcycle Regiments 4 Armored Train Battalions 1 Armored Car Battalion	3 Fighter Aviation Divisions 6 Mixed Aviation Divisions 3 Bomber Aviation Divisions 2 Mixed Aviation Brigades 2 Bomber Aviation Regiments 1 Mixed Aviation Regiment 2 Reconnaissance Aviation Regiments	2 Engineer Regiments 19 Separate Engineer Battalions 4 Separate Sapper Battalions

Japanese Army Battle Composition, Northeast Asia, 1 September 1941
Kwantung Army (Note: The author provides additional commentary here:)	Infantry, Airborne Forces, and Cavalry	Corps and Army Artillery, Air Defense Forces	Armored and Mechanized Forces	Air Forces	Engineering Troops
3rd Army	8th, 9th, 12th, 57th Divisions, 4th Independent Garrison Unit, 1st, 2nd, 10th, 11th Border Garrison Units	7th Artillery Command, 4th Mountain Artillery Regiment, 4th, 8th, 9th, 17th, 22nd Field Heavy Artillery Regiments, 2nd, 3rd, and Tungning (Dongning) Heavy Artillery Regiments, 1st, 2nd, 4th, 6th, 7th Independent Heavy Artillery Battalions, 11th, 12th, 13th Independent Mortar Battalions, 4th Independent Rapid Fire (AT) Battalion, 13th Field Air Defense Command, 48th, 50th, 51st, 55th Field AA Battalions, 22nd, 23rd, 28th Field Machine Cannon Companies	1st Tank Group (3rd, 5th, 9th Tank Regiments)	-	5th, 9th, 27th Independent Engineer Regiments, 24th, 25th, 28th, 31st Bridging Materials Companies, 39th, 46th, 47th, 48th Field Road Construction Units, 13th Field Duty Unit, 5th Field Construction Unit
4th Army	1st Division, 8th Independent Garrison Unit, 5th, 6th, 7th, 13th Border Garrison Units	5th Artillery Command, 1st Field Heavy Artillery Regiment, 8th Independent Heavy Artillery Battalion, 52nd Field AA Battalion, 26th Field Machine Cannon Company	-	-	2nd Engineer Command, 26th, 27th, 32nd, Bridging Materials Companies, 14th, 15th River Crossing Materials Companies, 87th Land Duty Company, 45th, 46th Construction Duty Companies
5th Army	11th, 24th, 25th Divisions, 3rd Cavalry Brigade, 6th Independent Garrison Unit, 3rd, 4th, 12th Border Garrison Units	8th Artillery Command, 5th, 7th, 12th, 20th Field Heavy Artillery Regiments, 1st Independent Field Artillery Regiment, 5th, 9th Independent Heavy Artillery Battalions, 12th Field Air Defense Command, 53rd, 54th Field AA Battalions, 20th, 24th, 27th Field Machine Cannon Companies, 6th Independent Rapid Fire (AT) Battalion	2nd Tank Group (4th, 10th, 11th Tank Regiments)	-	1st Engineer Command (HQ, 22nd, 24th Independent Engineer Regiments), 7th, 23rd Independent Engineer Regiments, 21st, 22nd, 29th Bridging Materials Companies, 13th River Crossing Materials Company, 38th, 42nd, 44th, 45th Field Road Construction Units, 17th Field Duty Unit, 8th Field Construction Unit
6th Army	23rd Division, 8th Border Garrison Unit	3rd, 7th Independent Rapid Fire (AT) Battalions, 18th Field Machine Cannon Company	-	-	49th Construction Duty Company
Kwantung Defense Army	1st, 2nd, 3rd, 5th, 9th Independent Garrison Units	-	-	-	-
Directly Subordinate (Ground Units)	10th, 14th, 28th, 29th, 51st Divisions, Hunchun Garrison Unit, 9th Border Garrison Unit, 7th Independent Garrison Unit	2nd, 10th, 18th Field Heavy Artillery Regiments, Mudanjiang Heavy Artillery Regiment, 10th Trench Mortar Battalion, 6th Independent Rapid Fire (AT) Battalion (duplicate), 11th, 14th, 15th, 16th Field Air Defense Commands, 32nd, 33rd, 34th, 35th, 36th, 40th, 44th, 45th, 49th, 56th Field AA Battalions, 26th, 27th, 28th, 29th, 30th, 31st Independent Field AA Companies, 16th, 25th, 29th Field Machine Cannon Companies	7th, 8th, 23rd Tank Regiments (23rd Formed Sept. '41)	Kwantung Army Air Corps	31st, 33rd, 34th Field Road Construction Units, 3rd Field Fortification Unit, 10th, 11th, 12th Field Duty Units, 4th, 6th, 7th Field Construction Units
Subtotal (Ground)	14 Infantry Divisions 14 Border Garrison Units 9 Independent Garrison Units	3 Artillery Commands 19 Artillery Regiments 8 Independent Artillery Battalions 4 Independent Mortar Battalions 3 Independent Rapid Fire (AT) Battalions 6 Field Air Defense Commands 17 Field AA Battalions 6 Independent Field AA Companies 11 Independent Field Machine Cannon Companies	2 Tank Groups 2 Tank Regiments (3 as of Sept. '41)	See below	2 Engineer Commands 5 Independent Engineer Regiments 10 Bridging Materials Companies 3 River Crossing Materials Companies 11 Field Road Construction Units 1 Field Fortification Unit 5 Field Duty Units 5 Field Construction Units 1 Land Duty Company 2 Construction Duty Companies
Kwantung Army Air Corps (Subordinate to Kwantung Army)	Fighter Units	Bomber Units	Direct Cooperation Units	Mixed Units	Reconnaissance
2nd Air Group (2nd, 7th, 8th Air Brigades)	9th (3 Fighter Companies), 33rd (3 Fighter Cos.) Air Regiments	6th (3 Light Bomber Cos.), 16th (3 Light Bomber Cos.), 32nd (3 Light Bomber Cos.), 12th (3 Heavy Bomber Cos.), 58th (3 Heavy Bomber Cos.), 98th (3 Heavy Bomber Cos.) Air Regiments	-	29th Independent Air Unit (1 Army Recon. Co., 1 Direct Cooperation Co.)	28th (2 Area Army Recon. Cos.), 83rd (2 Army Recon. Cos.) Independent Air Units
5th Air Group (9th, 10th Air Brigades)	24th (3 Fighter Cos.), 77th (3 Fighter Cos.) Air Regiments	31st (3 Light Bomber Cos.), 45th (3 Light Bomber Cos.), 61st (3 Heavy Bomber Cos.) Air Regiments	-	-	-
12th Air Brigade	1st (3 Fighter Cos.), 11th (3 Fighter Cos.), 70th (2 Fighter Cos.) Air Regiments	-	-	-	-
13th Air Brigade	85th (2 Fighter Cos.), 87th (2 Fighter Cos.) Air Regiments	-	-	-	-
Hajukoshi Army Air School Air Instruction Brigade	-	208th Air Instruction Regiment (2 Light Bomber Cos.)	-	206th Independent Air Unit (1 Co. Army Reconnaissance, 1 Co. Direct Cooperation)	-
Miscellaneous	-	7th Air Regiment (3 Heavy Bomber Cos.)	6th, 7th Direct Cooperation Air Units	15th Independent Air Unit (1 Co. Army Recon, 1 Co. Direct Cooperation)	-
Subtotal (Air)	9 Air Regiments	11 Air Regiments	2 Direct Cooperation Air Units	3 Independent Air Units	2 Independent Air Units
Korea Army	Infantry, Airborne Forces, and Cavalry	Corps and Army Artillery, Air Defense Forces	Armored and Mechanized Forces	Air Forces	Engineering Troops
Directly Subordinate	19th, 20th Divisions, Chinhae Bay, Najin, Yongfung Bay, Yosu Fortress Units	15th Field Heavy Artillery Regiment, Chinhae Bay, Najin, Yongfung Bay, Yosu Artillery Regiments, 41st, 42nd, Field AA Regiments, 5th, 6th Reserve AA Regiments, Yosu AA Regiment, 41st, 47th Field AA Battalions, 35th, 41st, 42nd, 43rd, 44th, 45th Independent Field AA Companies, 19th Independent Field Machine Cannon Company	-	-	23rd Independent Engineer Regiment
Subtotal	2 Infantry Divisions 4 Fortress Units	1 Artillery Regiment (Excluding Fortress Artillery) 4 AA Regiments (Excluding Fortress AA) 2 Field AA Battalions 6 Independent Field AA Companies 1 Independent Field Machine Cannon Company	-	-	1 Independent Engineer Regiment
Northern Army	Infantry, Airborne Forces, and Cavalry	Corps and Army Artillery, Air Defense Forces	Armored and Mechanized Forces	Air Forces	Engineering Troops
Directly Subordinate	7th Division, Karafuto Mixed Brigade, Kitachishima, North Chishima, Tsugaru, Soya Fortress Units	Kitachishima, Tsugaru, Soya Fortress Artillery Regiments, 5th, 6th Fortress Artillery Units, 31st Field AA Regiment, Soya AA Regiment, 31st, 32nd Field AA Battalions, 22nd, 23rd, 31st, 32nd, 33rd, 34th, 43rd Independent Field AA Companies	-	-	24th Fortress Engineer Regiment
Subtotal	1 Infantry Division 1 Mixed Brigade 4 Fortress Units	1 Field AA Regiment 2 Field AA Battalions 7 Independent Field AA Companies	-	-	1 Engineer Regiment
Total Kwantung Army, Korea Army, and North Japan Army	17 Infantry Divisions 14 Border Garrison Units 9 Independent Garrison Units 1 Mixed Brigade 8 Fortress Units	3 Artillery Commands 20 Artillery Regiments (Excluding Fortress Artillery) 8 Independent Artillery Battalions 4 Independent Mortar Battalions 3 Independent Rapid Fire (AT) Battalions 6 Field Air Defense Commands 5 AA Regiments 21 Field AA Battalions 19 Independent Field AA Companies 12 Independent Field Machine Cannon Companies	2 Tank Groups 2 Tank Regiments (3 as of Sept. '41)	20 Air Regiments 3 Independent Air Units 2 Direct Cooperation Air Units	2 Engineer Commands 9 Independent Engineer Regiments 10 Bridging Materials Companies 3 River Crossing Materials Companies 11 Field Road Construction Units 1 Field Fortification Unit 5 Field Duty Units 5 Field Construction Units 1 Land Duty Company 2 Construction Duty Companies

Soviet Far East Army Battle Composition, 1 March 1942
Transbaikal Military District	Rifle, Airborne Forces, and Cavalry	Corps and Army Artillery, High Command Reserve Artillery, and Air Defense Forces	Armored and Mechanized Forces	Air Forces	Engineering Troops
17th Army	36th, 57th Motor Rifle Divisions, 1st, 3rd Separate Motor Rifle Regiments	185th Artillery Regiment, 413th Howitzer Artillery Regiment, 63rd, 66th, 376th, 382nd Separate AA Battalions	61st Tank Division, 9th Motorized Armored Brigade, 30th Motorcycle Regiment, 70th, 82nd Separate Tank Brigades, 63rd Separate Armored Train	22nd, 56th, 350th Fighter Aviation Regiments, 56, 454th Bomber Aviation Regiments, 132nd Reconnaissance Aviation Squadron	17th, 84th Pontoon Bridge Battalions, 282nd Separate Engineer Battalion
36th Army	94th, 209th, 210th Rifle Divisions, 51st Cavalry Division, 317th Separate Cavalry Regiment, 31st and 32nd Fortified Regions	259th Howitzer Artillery Regiment, 267th, 390th Artillery Regiments, 14th Separate Mortar Battalion, 120th, 401st, 405th, 414th Separate AA Battalions	111th Tank Division, 33rd, 35th Separate Tank Battalions, 64th, 65th Separate Armored Trains	64th, 291st Storm Aviation Regiments, 70th, 351st, 718th Fighter Aviation Regiments, 455th, 541st Bomber Aviation Regiments, 135th Reconnaissance Aviation Squadron	2nd Pontoon Bridge Battalion, 39th Separate Sapper Battalion
Directly Subordinate	Separate Parachute-Landing Battalion (no number)	106th High-Power Howitzer Artillery Regiment, 216th Howitzer Artillery Regiment, 13th Separate Mortar Battalion, 410th Separate AA Battalion	-	30th Bomber Aviation Division, 51st Fighter Aviation Regiment, 49th, 456, 457th Bomber Aviation Regiments (short-range/ббап), 133rd, 134th Reconnaissance Aviation Squadrons	51st, 102nd Separate Engineer Battalions, 1st, 15th Pontoon Bridge Battalions
Subtotal	5 Rifle Divisions 1 Cavalry Division 2 Fortified Regions 2 Separate Rifle Regiments 1 Separate Cavalry Regiment	7 Artillery Regiments 2 Separate Mortar Battalions 9 Separate AA Battalions	2 Tank Divisions 1 Motorized Armored Brigade 4 Separate Tank Battalions 1 Motorcycle Regiment	1 Aviation Division 16 Aviation Regiments	3 Separate Engineer Battalions 1 Separate Sapper Battalion 5 Separate Pontoon Bridge Battalions
Far Eastern Front	Rifle, Airborne Forces, and Cavalry	Corps and Army Artillery, High Command Reserve Artillery, and Air Defense Forces	Armored and Mechanized Forces	Air Forces	Engineering Troops
1st Army	26th Rifle Corps (22nd, 59th, and "Grodekovskaya" Rifle Divisions), 59th Rifle Corps (39th, 98th Rifle Divisions, 246th Rifle Brigade), 87th Rifle Division, 8th Cavalry Division, 246th Separate Cavalry Regiment, 105th, 112th Fortified Regions	45, 87th, 165th, 182nd Howitzer Artillery Regiments, 199th High-Power Howitzer Artillery Regiment, 50th, 273rd Cannon Artillery Regiments, 43rd, 44th, 45th, 103rd Separate AA Battalions	2nd Tank Division, 75th, 77th Tank Brigades, Light Motor Rifle Brigade (no number), 3 Separate Armored Train	32nd, 33rd, 34th, 98th Mixed Aviation Divisions, 776th Light Bomber Aviation Regiment, 26th, 59th Corrective Aviation Squadrons, 137th Reconnaissance Aviation Squadron	29th, 278th Separate Engineer Battalions, 50th Pontoon Bridge Battalion
2nd Army	3rd, 12th, 96th, 204th Rifle Divisions, 258th, 259th Rifle Brigades, 101st Fortified Region	42nd Cannon Artillery Regiment, 114th, 147th, 238th, 411th Howitzer Artillery Regiments, 550th High-Power Howitzer Artillery Regiment, 192nd Separate Artillery Battalion, 22nd Separate Mortar Battalion, 9th, 42nd Separate AA Battalions	73rd, 74th Tank Brigades, 2 Separate Armored Trains, 5th Separate Armored Car Battalion	82nd Bomber Aviation Division, 95th, 96th Mixed Aviation Divisions, 140th Reconnaissance Aviation Squadron, 328th Corrective Aviation Squadron	2nd Heavy Pontoon Bridge Regiment, 10th, 29th Pontoon Bridge Battalions, 277th Separate Engineer Battalion
15th Army	34th Rifle Division, 102nd Fortified Region	52nd Artillery Regiment, 145th Howitzer Artillery Regiment, 46th Separate AA Battalion	1st Tank Division, "Vyazemskiy" Separate Armored Train	69th, 97th Mixed Aviation Divisions, 139th Reconnaissance Aviation Squadron, 329th Corrective Aviation Squadron	3rd Heavy Pontoon Bridge Regiment, 129th Separate Sapper Battalion, 11th, 24th Pontoon Bridge Battalions
25th Army	39th Rifle Corps (40th, 105th, 126th, 208th Rifle Divisions), "Poltavskaya" Rifle Division, 247th Separate Cavalry Regiment 106th, 107th, 108th, 110th, 111th, 113th Fortified Regions	107th, 148th, 215th, 386th Howitzer Artillery Regiments, 549th High-Power Howitzer Artillery Regiment, 282nd, 548th Cannon Artillery Regiments, 21st Separate Mortar Battalion, 28th, 70th Separate AA Battalions	72nd, 76th Tank Brigades, 9th Separate Armored Train	70th, 99th Mixed Aviation Divisions, 83rd Bomber Aviation Division, 138th Reconnaissance Aviation Squadron, 330th Corrective Aviation Squadron	32nd, 100th, 276th, 279 Separate Engineer Battalions, 69th Separate Sapper Battalion
35th Army	35th, 66th, 422nd Rifle Divisions, 109th Fortified Region	177th, 181st, 263rd Howitzer Artillery Regiments, 76th, 187th Cannon Artillery Regiments, 110th Separate AA Battalion	Separate Tank Brigade (no number), 29th Motorcycle Regiment, Separate Armored Train (no number)	79th Mixed Aviation Division, 18th Reconnaissance Aviation Squadron, 130th Corrective Aviation Squadron	3rd, 16th Pontoon Bridge Battalions, 60th Separate Sapper Battalion, 280th, 402nd Separate Engineer Battalions
Directly Subordinate	Special Rifle Corps (79th Rifle Division - Sakhalin Island, "Sakhalinskaya" Rifle Brigade - Sakhalin Island, 101st Rifle Division - Petropavlovsk-Kamchatskiy), 205th Rifle Division, 2nd Rifle Brigade, 202nd Air Landing Brigade, 103rd, 104th Fortified Regions	362nd, 367th Separate Artillery Battalions, 102nd Separate AA Battalion	13th Separate Armored Train	29th Fighter Aviation Division, 53rd Bomber Aviation Division, 5th Mixed Aviation Brigade, 71st Mixed Aviation Regiment, 139th 251st Bomber Aviation Regiments, 168th Reconnaissance Aviation Regiment, 97th Corrective Aviation Squadron	26th, 101st Separate Engineer Battalions
Subtotal	4 Rifle Corps 22 Rifle Divisions 1 Cavalry Division 6 Rifle Brigades 1 Airborne Brigade 2 Separate Cavalry Regiments 1 Separate Rifle Regiment 13 Fortified Regions	27 Artillery Regiments 3 Separate Artillery Battalions 2 Separate Mortar Battalions 11 Separate AA Battalions	2 Tank Divisions 7 Tank Brigades 1 Motor Rifle Brigade 1 Motorcycle Regiment 5 Separate Armored Trains	15 Aviation Divisions 1 Aviation Brigade 5 Aviation Regiments	2 Pontoon Bridge Regiments 11 Separate Engineer Battalions 3 Separate Sapper Battalions 7 Pontoon Bridge Battalions
Total Far East and Transbaikal Military District	4 Rifle Corps 27 Rifle Divisions 2 Cavalry Divisions 6 Rifle Brigades 1 Airborne Brigade 3 Separate Rifle Regiments 3 Separate Cavalry Regiments 15 Fortified Regions	34 Artillery Regiments 3 Separate Artillery Battalions 4 Separate Mortar Battalions 20 Separate AA Battalions	4 Tank Divisions 7 Tank Brigades 1 Motorized Armored Brigade 1 Motor Rifle Brigade 4 Separate Tank Battalions 2 Motorcycle Regiments 1 Armored Car Battalion 5 Separate Armored Trains	16 Aviation Divisions 1 Aviation Brigade 21 Aviation Regiments	2 Pontoon Bridge Regiments 14 Separate Engineer Battalions 4 Separate Sapper Battalions 12 Pontoon Bridge Battalions

== See also ==
- Operation Barbarossa
- Proposed Japanese invasion of Australia during World War II

== Sources ==
- Askey, Nigel (2013). Operation Barbarossa: The Complete Organizational and Statistical Analysis and Military Simulation. Vol. IIA. Lulu.com. ISBN 978-1-304-45329-7.
- Coox, Alvin (1985). Nomonhan: Japan against Russia, 1939. Stanford, CA: Stanford University Press. ISBN 978-0-8047-1835-6.
- Cherevko, Kirill Evgen'evich (2003). Serp i Molot protiv Samurayskogo Mecha [Hammer and sickle against Samurai Sword]. Moscow: Veche. ISBN 978-5-94538-328-9.(link)
- Drea, Edward (1981). Nomonhan: Japanese-Soviet Tactical Combat, 1939 (PDF). Leavenworth Papers (online ed.). Fort Leavenworth, KS: Combat Studies Institute. OCLC 464602642. Archived from the original (PDF) on August 13, 2012.
- Glantz, David (2004). The Soviet Strategic Offensive in Manchuria, 1945: "August Storm". London: Routledge. ISBN 978-1-135-77499-8.
- Hattori, Takushiro (1955). Japanese Operational Planning against the USSR. Japanese Monographs: Japanese Studies on Manchuria. Vol. I. et al. Military History Section, HQ Army Forces Far East. OCLC 63860465.
- Hayashi, Saburo; Yano, Muraji (1955). Japanese Special Studies on Manchuria: Study of Strategical and Tactical Peculiarities of Far Eastern Russia and Soviet Far East Forces. Vol. XIII. Military History Section, HQ Army Forces Far East. OCLC 832049534. Archived from the original on 28 February 2018.
- Heinrichs, Waldo (1990). Threshold of War: Franklin D. Roosevelt and American Entry into World War II. Oxford: Oxford University Press. ISBN 978-0-19-987904-5.
- Humphreys, Leonard A. (1996). The Way of the Heavenly Sword: The Japanese Army in the 1920s. Stanford, CA: Stanford University Press. ISBN 978-0-8047-2375-6.
- Ishiwatari (1954). Japanese Preparations for Operations in Manchuria Prior to 1943 (PDF). et al. Headquarters, Army Forces Far East: Military History Section. OCLC 220383206.
- Japanese Tank and Antitank Warfare (PDF). Special series (United States. War Department). Washington D.C.: War Department. 1945. OCLC 55009262. Archived from the original (PDF) on September 4, 2012.
- Kondrat'ev, Vyacheslav Leonidovich (2002). Khalkhin-Gol: Voyna v vozduzhe [Khalkhin-Gol War in the air]. Moscow: Youth Technology. ISBN 978-5-88573-009-9.(link)
- Koshkin, Anatoliy Arkad'evich (2011). "Kantokuen" - "Barbarossa" po-Yaponski. Pochemu Yaponiya ne napala na SSSR ["Kantokuen" - "Barbarossa" in Japanese. Why Japan did not attack the USSR]. Moscow: Veche. ISBN 978-5-95335-345-8.(link)
- Khazanov, Dmitriy; Medved, Aleksander (2015). Bf 109E/F vs Yak-1/7: Eastern Front 1941–42. London: Bloomsbury. ISBN 978-1-4728-0580-5.
- Li, Peter (2002). Japanese War Crimes: The Search for Justice. Routledge. ISBN 978-0765808905.
- Mawdsley, Evan (2007). Thunder in the East: The Nazi-Soviet War 1941–1945. London: Hodder Arnold. ISBN 978-0-340-61392-4.
- Shtemenko, Sergei Matveevich (1970). The Soviet General Staff at War, 1941–1945. Moscow: Progress. OCLC 473767901.
- Soldier's Guide to the Japanese Army. Special series (United States. War Department General Staff.). Washington D.C.: War Department. 1944. OCLC 1389205.
- The Effects of Strategic Bombing on Japan's War Economy. Washington, D.C.: United States Strategic Bombing Survey Overall Effects Division. 1946. OCLC 504257715.
- Zaloga, Steven J. (2007). Japanese Tanks 1939–45. Oxford: Osprey. ISBN 978-1-84603-091-8.
- Zhumatiy, Vladimir Ivanovich (2006). Boevoy i chislenniy sostav Voenno-Morskogo Flota SSSR (1918–1945 gg.): statisticheskiy sbornik [Combat and Numerical Strength of the Navy of the USSR (1918–1945): Statistical Compendium]. Moscow: Military History Institute, Russian Ministry of Defense.
- Zolotarev, Vladimir Antonovich; Emelin, A. S. (1996). Velikaya Otechestvennaya, STAVKA VGK Dokumenti i Materiali 1942 [Great Patriotic War, Stavka VGK Documents and Materials 1942]. Russkiy Arkhiv. Moscow: Military History Institute, Russian Ministry of Defense. OCLC 623089539.(link)
