= Japanese occupation of Malaya =

Part of World War II

Malaya: マラヤ (Japanese); Tanah Melayu (Malay); 馬來亞 (Chinese); மலாயா (Tamil)
- 1941–1945
- Flag Imperial Seal
- Motto: 八紘一宇; Hakkō Ichiu "Eight Crown Cords, One Roof"
- Anthem: 君が代; Kimigayo "His Imperial Majesty's Reign"
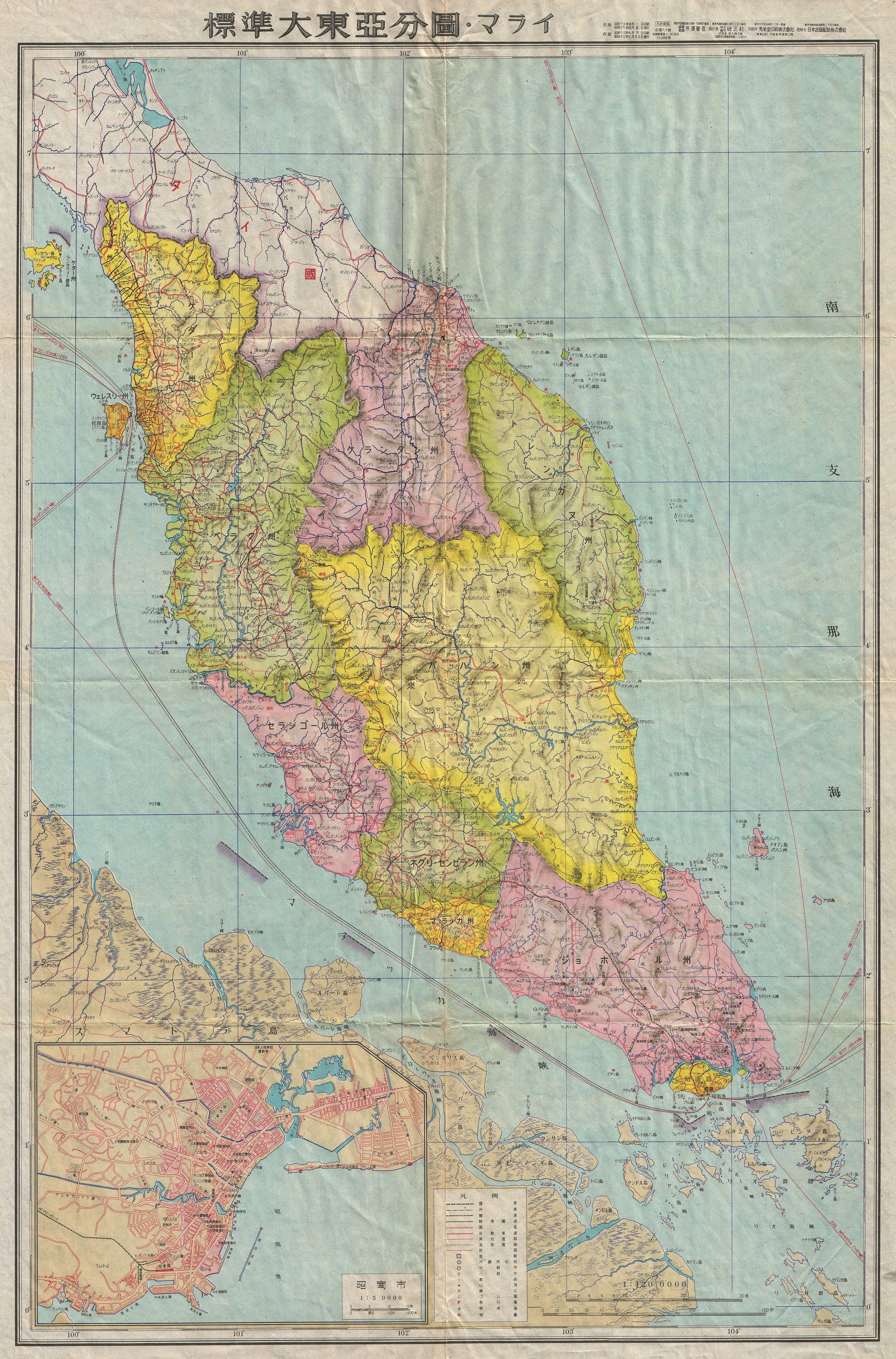
- Japanese possessions of British Malaya in 1942
- Status: Military occupation by the Empire of Japan
- Capital: None (de jure); Singapore (de facto, 1942–1944); Taiping (de facto, 1944–1945)
- Common languages: Japanese; English; Malay; Chinese; Tamil
- Emperor
  - 1942–1945: Shōwa
- Historical era: World War II
  - Pacific War begins: 8 December 1941^{a}
  - Japanese troops land on Kota Bharu: 8 December 1941
  - British troops retreat to Singapore: 31 January 1942
  - Surrender of British forces in Malaya: 15 February 1942
  - Annexation of the Four states to Thailand: 18 October 1943
  - Japanese surrender: 2 September 1945
  - British Military Administration set up: 12 September 1945
  - Formation of Malayan Union: 1 April 1946
- Currency: Japanese-issued dollar ("Banana money")
Preceded by
Federated Malay States
Straits Settlements
Unfederated Malay States
Succeeded by
Si Rat Malai
British Military Administration (Malaya)
- Today part of: Malaysia
- 1. The Pacific War started on 8 December 1941 in Asian time zones, but is often referred to as starting on 7 December, as that was the date in European and American time zones (such as for the attack on Pearl Harbor in the United States' Territory of Hawaii).

Malaya, then under British occupation, was gradually occupied by Japanese forces between 8 December 1941 and the Allied surrender at Singapore on 15 February 1942. The Japanese remained in occupation until their surrender to the Allies in 1945. The first Japanese garrison in Malaya to lay down their arms was in Penang on 2 September 1945 aboard HMS Nelson.

== Prelude ==
The concept of a unified East Asia took form based on an Imperial Japanese Army concept that originated with Hachirō Arita, who served as Minister for Foreign Affairs from 1936 to 1940. The Japanese Army said the new Japanese empire was an Asian equivalent of the Monroe Doctrine, especially with the Roosevelt Corollary. The regions of Asia, it was argued, were as essential to Japan as Latin America was to the US

The Japanese Foreign Minister Yōsuke Matsuoka formally announced the idea of the Co-Prosperity Sphere on 1 August 1940, in a press interview, but it had existed in other forms for many years. Leaders in Japan had long had an interest in the idea. The outbreak of World War II fighting in Europe had given the Japanese an opportunity to demand the withdrawal of support from China in the name of "Asia for Asiatics", with the European powers unable to effectively retaliate. Many of the other nations within the boundaries of the sphere were under colonial rule and elements of their population were sympathetic to Japan (as in the case of Indonesia), occupied by Japan in the early phases of the war and reformed under puppet governments, or already under Japan's control at the outset (as in the case of Manchukuo). These factors helped make the formation of the sphere while lacking any real authority or joint power, come together without much difficulty. The sphere would, according to imperial propaganda, establish a new international order seeking "co prosperity" for Asian countries which would share prosperity and peace, free from Western colonialism and domination under the umbrella of a benevolent Japan. ธิชาภัทร สมใจ(1987)

== Preparation ==
Japanese Military Affairs Bureau Unit 82 was formed in 1939 or 1940 and based in Taiwan to bring this about. In its final planning stages, the unit was under the then-Colonel Yoshihide Hayashi. Intelligence on Malaya was gathered through a network of agents which included Japanese embassy staff; disaffected Malayans (particularly members of the Japanese established Tortoise Society); and Japanese, Korean, and Taiwanese business people and tourists. Japanese spies, which included a British intelligence officer, Captain Patrick Stanley Vaughan Heenan and Lord Sempill also provided intelligence and assistance. Heenan's intelligence enabled the Japanese to destroy much of the Allied air forces on the ground.

Prior to hostilities, Japanese intelligence officers like Iwaichi Fujiwara had established covert intelligence offices (or Kikans) that linked up with the Malay and Indian pro-independence organisations such as Kesatuan Melayu Muda in Malaya and the Indian Independence League. The Japanese gave these movements financial support in return for their members providing intelligence and later assistance in determining Allied troop movements, strengths, and dispositions prior to the invasion.

By 1941 the Japanese had been engaged for four years in trying to subjugate China. They were heavily reliant on imported materials for their military forces, particularly oil from the United States. From 1940 to 1941, the United States, the United Kingdom, and the Netherlands imposed embargoes on supplying oil and war materials to Japan. The object of the embargoes was to assist the Chinese and encourage the Japanese to halt military action in China. The Japanese considered that pulling out of China would result in a loss of face and decided instead to take military action against US, British and Dutch territories in South East Asia. The Japanese forces for the invasion were assembled in 1941 on Hainan Island and in French Indochina. The troop build-up in Indo-China and Hainan was noticed by the Allies and, when asked, the Japanese advised that it related to its operations in China.

== Conquest ==
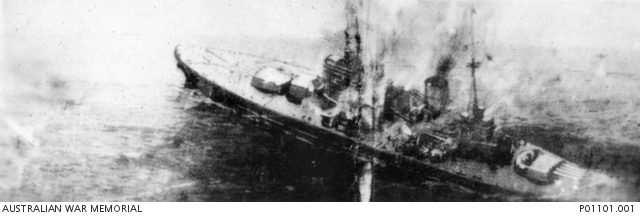
HMS Prince of Wales sinking after being hit by Japanese bombs and torpedoes on 10 December 1941

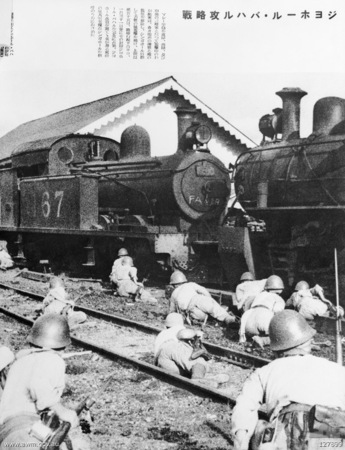
Japanese troops take cover behind steam engines at the Johor railway station in January 1942.

The occupation commenced with Imperial Japanese Army landings at Padang Pak Amat beach Kota Bharu just after midnight on 8 December 1941, triggering a ferocious battle with the British Indian Army an hour before the attack on Pearl Harbor. This battle marked the official start of the Pacific War and the start of the Japanese occupation of Malaya. Kota Bharu airport was occupied in the morning. Sungai Patani, Butterworth, and Alor Star airports were captured on 9 December 1941. Japanese soldiers landing at Kota Bharu divided into two separate forces, with one moving down the east coast towards Kuantan, and the other southwards towards the Perak River. On 11 December 1941, the Japanese started bombing Penang. Jitra and then Alor Star fell into Japanese hands on 12 December 1941. The British had to retreat to the south. On 16 December 1941, the British left Penang to the Japanese, who occupied it on 19 December.

The Japanese continued to advance southwards, capturing Ipoh on 26 December. Fierce resistance to Japanese progress in the Battle of Kampar lasted three days and three nights between 30 December 1941 and 2 January 1942, before the British had to retreat once again. On 7 January 1942, two brigades of the 11th Indian Infantry Division were defeated in the Battle of Slim River, giving the Japanese army easy passage to Kuala Lumpur, the capital of Malaya. On 9 January, the British position was becoming more desperate and the ABDACOM Supreme Commander, General Wavell, decided to withdraw all the British and Commonwealth forces south to Johor, thus abandoning Kuala Lumpur (which was captured by the Japanese on 13 January).

The British defensive line was established in north Johor, from Muar in the west, through Segamat, and then to Mersing in the east. The 45th Indian Infantry Brigade were placed along the western part of the line between Muar and Segamat. The Australian Imperial Force (AIF) were concentrated in the middle, from where they advanced north from Segamat, clashing with the advancing Japanese army at Gemas on 14 January. The 15th Division (forming the main Japanese force) arrived on 15 January and forced the Australians back to Segamat. The Japanese then proceeded west towards the inexperienced 45th Indian Brigade, easily defeating them. The Allied command directed the Australian 2/19th and 2/29th Battalions to the west; the 2/19th Battalion engaged the Japanese on 17 January 1942 to the south of Muar.

Fighting continued until 18 January, and despite efforts by the 2/19th and 2/29th Battalions, the Johor defensive line collapsed. The Allies had to retreat across the Johor Causeway to Singapore. As 31 January 1942 approached, the whole of Malaya had fallen into Japanese hands.

== Occupation ==
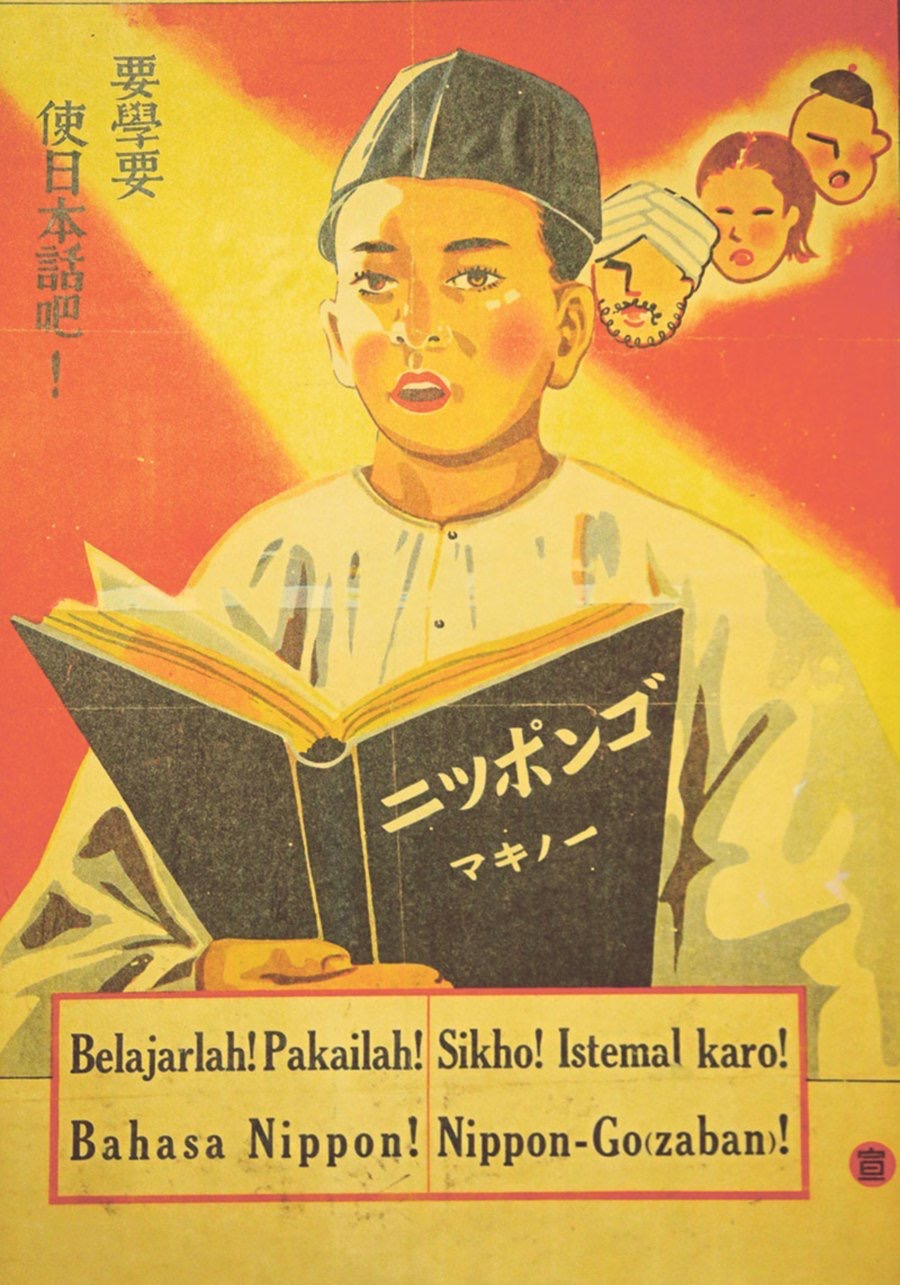
Propaganda poster in Malay, Chinese, and Latin-script Hindustani encouraging Malayans to learn Japanese and adopt Japanese culture

=== Japanese policy ===
Japanese policy for the administration of occupied territories was developed in February 1941 by Colonel Obata Nobuyoshi (Section Chief of Intelligence – Southern Army), and Lt Colonels Otoji Nishimura and Seijiro Tofuku of the General Staff. They set out five principles: acquisition of vital materials for national defence, restoration of law and order, self-sufficiency for the troops in the occupied territories, respect for established local organisations and customs, and no hasty discussion of future status of sovereignty. Administrative-wise, the Straits Settlements were to be placed directly under the Japanese Army, the Federated Malay States and Johor will remain as autonomous protectorates under their sultans, while the four northern states were to eventually revert to Thai rule.

Once occupied Malaya was placed under the Malay Military Administration (Marai Gunsei Kumbu) of the Imperial Japanese Army. The 25th Army's chief of staff was the superintendent and its Chief of General Affairs Department Colonel Watanabe Wataru its executive officer. It was Wataru that implemented the occupation policies. He had a particularly hard-line view, treating the Chinese particularly harshly because of their support for mainland China against Japan. Malays and Indians were dealt with more moderately because of their cooperation.

Wataru strongly believed British rule had introduced a hedonistic and materialistic way of life to the indigenous people. He considered that they needed to be taught to endure hardship with physical and spiritual training and education. Wataru also believed that they must also be ready to give their lives if necessary to establish Hakkō ichiu (the whole world under one roof) and the Greater East Asia Co-Prosperity Sphere.

When Wataru was replaced in March 1943 by Major-General Masuzo Fujimuro, the Japanese war position had deteriorated and they recognized that they needed the co-operation of the entire population. Gradually the more repressive policies towards the Chinese were lifted and advisory councils were formed. In March 1944 Colonel Hamada Hiroshi established a public reading room to engage in discussion with the Chinese community leaders and youth.

=== Cultural and geographic changes ===
The Japanese sought to change the common language of Malaya to Japanese. Its initial moves were to change shop signs and street names. Penang was renamed Tōjō Island (東條島, Tōjō-tō) and Malaya renamed Malai (馬来, Marai). The time zone was also moved to align with Japan.

The Japanese custom of bowing was also introduced with the populace expected to bow to Japanese soldiers on guard duty. Malay was considered a dialect and the Japanese wanted it to be standardised with Sumatran.

=== Propaganda ===
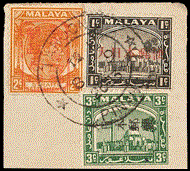
Japanese stamps as issued in Tandjoengpinang, Riow (present-day Tanjung Pinang, Riau Islands, Indonesia) in 1943. During the Japanese occupation, the archipelago was incorporated under the territorial jurisdiction of Malaya.

The invading Japanese forces used slogans such as "Asia untuk orang Asia" (translation: Asia for Asians) to win support from the local Malays. Malay radicals had been given strict instruction to abide by Japanese military plans to create "Asians for Asians" and a "Greater East Asia Co-Prosperity Sphere" with Malaya as an important base. The Japanese worked hard to convince the local population that they were the actual saviours of Malaya while Britain was portrayed as an imperialist force that wished to exploit Malaya's resources. However, in November 1943, when the Japanese held the Greater East Asia Conference, both Malaya and Indonesia were excluded as the Japanese Military wanted to annex both regions.

=== Newspapers ===
The Japanese news agency, Dōmei Tsushin, was granted a monopoly covering Malaya, Singapore, and British Borneo. All news publications in this region fell under its control. An exception may have been The Perak Times which was published by John Victor Morais in Ipoh from 1942 to 1943.

In Penang, on 8 December 1942 the Penang Malay, Chinese, and English newspapers were combined in the Penang Shimbun. Abdullah Ariff, a pioneer Malay watercolourist, drew cartoons for the newspaper. Ariff became an active member of the pro-independence UMNO after the war and eventually a Penang City Councillor from 1955 to 1957. The Malai Sinpo replaced the Malay Mail on 1 January 1943 and was published in Kuala Lumpur. The Jawi script Warta Malaya, owned by Ibrahim Yaacob and financed by the Japanese, ceased publication prior to the Japanese invasion and resumed for a short period from mid 1942 until 14 August 1942. During that brief period, it was managed by the Japanese.

=== Garrisons ===
The 25th Army Headquartered at Singapore provided garrison duty in Malaya until January 1944. It was replaced by the 29th Army's, 94th Infantry Division, under Lieutenant General Teizo Ishiguro, which was Headquartered in Taiping, Perak until the end of the war.

The Second (with the 25th Army) and later the Third (with the 29th Army) Field Kempeitai Units of the Southern Expeditionary Army Group served as military police. These units were able, at will, to arrest and interrogate, with torture, both military and civilians. The civilian police force was subservient to them. The Commander of the 2nd Field Kempeitai unit was Lieutenant Colonel Oishi Masayuki. No 3 Kempeitai was commanded by Major-General Masanori Kojima. By the end of the war there were 758 Kempeitai stationed in Malaya, with more in the Thai occupied Malay states.

=== Penang submarine base ===
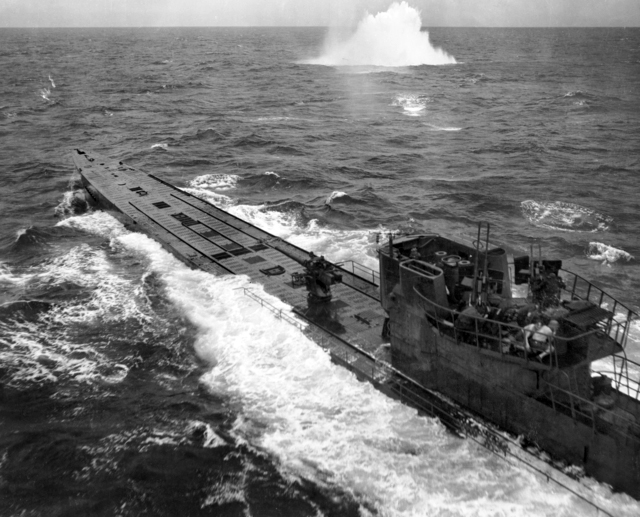
U-848 under attack by Allied aircraft while sailing to join the Monsun Gruppe

During the occupation Penang was used as a submarine port by the Japanese, Italian, and German navies. The Imperial Japanese Navy's 6th fleet Submarine Squadron 8 was based at Penang from February 1942 under Rear-Admiral Ishizaki Noboru. The base was used as a refuelling depot for submarines bound for German-occupied Europe and for operations in the Indian Ocean. In early 1943 the first German and Italian submarines began to call at Penang. In April 1943 U-178 under Kapitanleutnant Wilhelm Dommes was sent to set up and command the German U-boat base at Penang. This base was the only operational base used by all three Axis navies.

Japanese submarines from Penang participated in the Battle of Madagascar on 29 May 1942 attacking shipping in Diego Suarez harbour. Seven Italian BETASOM submarines were adapted to carry critical matériel from the Far East (Bagnolin, Barbarigo, Comandante Cappellini, Giuseppe Finzi, Reginaldo Giuliani, Enrico Tazzoli, and Luigi Torelli) of which two were sunk by the Allies, two were captured at Penang by the Germans after the September 1943 Italian surrender and used by them, and a fifth was captured in Bordeaux by the Germans, but not used.

Of the first 11 U-boats assigned to the Monsun Gruppe at the base, only U-168, U-183, U-188, and U-532 arrived between October and November 1943. Of the second group sent in late 1943 only U-510 made it through the Allied-held oceans. It arrived in April 1944 at a time when the focus had changed from combat missions to transport between Europe and Asia. These cargo missions were to transport much-needed war supplies between Germany and Japan.

By March 1944 the base was running short of supplies, was under a growing threat from Allied anti-submarine patrols. It lacked air support and reconnaissance. The Japanese had pulled their submarines out of Penang before the end on 1944 because the base had fallen within Allied bombing range. The Germans remained until December 1944 before withdrawing to Singapore.

When Germany surrendered the surviving submarines were taken by the Japanese and the German sailors moved to Batu Pahat. When the British returned in 1945 the sailors were imprisoned at Changi, with the last, Fregattenkapitän Wilhelm Dommes, being repatriated to Germany in 1947.

=== Civil service ===
Overall the control and administration was the responsibility of the Japanese 25th Army. The Japanese threatened Thailand, leading to the transfer of the northern Malay states to Thai control. With the transfer of Malaya from the 25th to the 29th Army, Johore was placed under control of the Southern Army based at Singapore.

Japanese and Taiwanese civilians headed the Malayan civil service and police during the occupation. The structure remained similar to that of Malaya's pre-war civil service with many former Civil Servants being reappointed. Many of the laws and regulations of the British administration continued in use. The Sultans were initially allowed to continue as nominal rulers, with the intent that they would eventually be completely removed from power.

=== Thai annexation of northern Malaya states ===
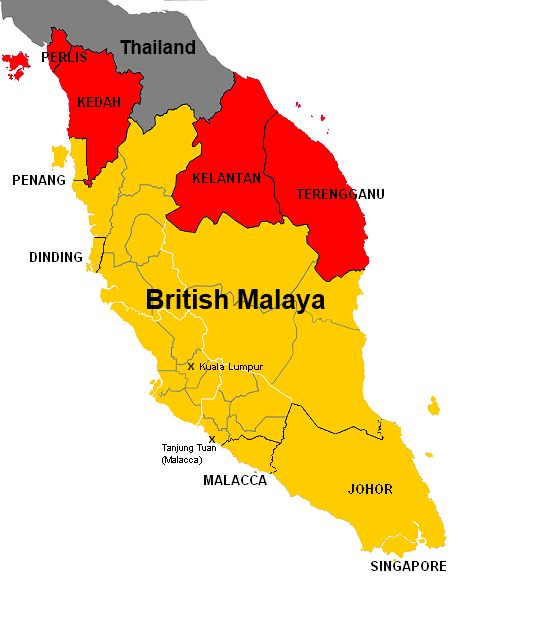
States occupied by Thailand

Up until 1909 Kedah, Perlis, Kelantan, and Terengganu were Thai territories. As part of an agreement in 1909 Thailand transferred them to British control. In July 1943, Japanese Prime Minister Hideki Tojo announced that Kedah, Perlis, Kelantan, and Terengganu were to be returned to Thailand as part of the military alliance signed between Thailand and Japan on 21 December 1941. Thailand administered the states as Syburi, Palit, Kalantan and Trangkanu provinces from 18 October 1943 until the surrender of the Japanese at the end of the war. Japanese troops and Kempeitai continued to be stationed at the states.

=== Living conditions ===
==== Recruiting campaigns ====
The Japanese undertook recruiting, particularly with the Indian and Malay populations, both prior to and after the occupation.

==== Indian Independence League ====
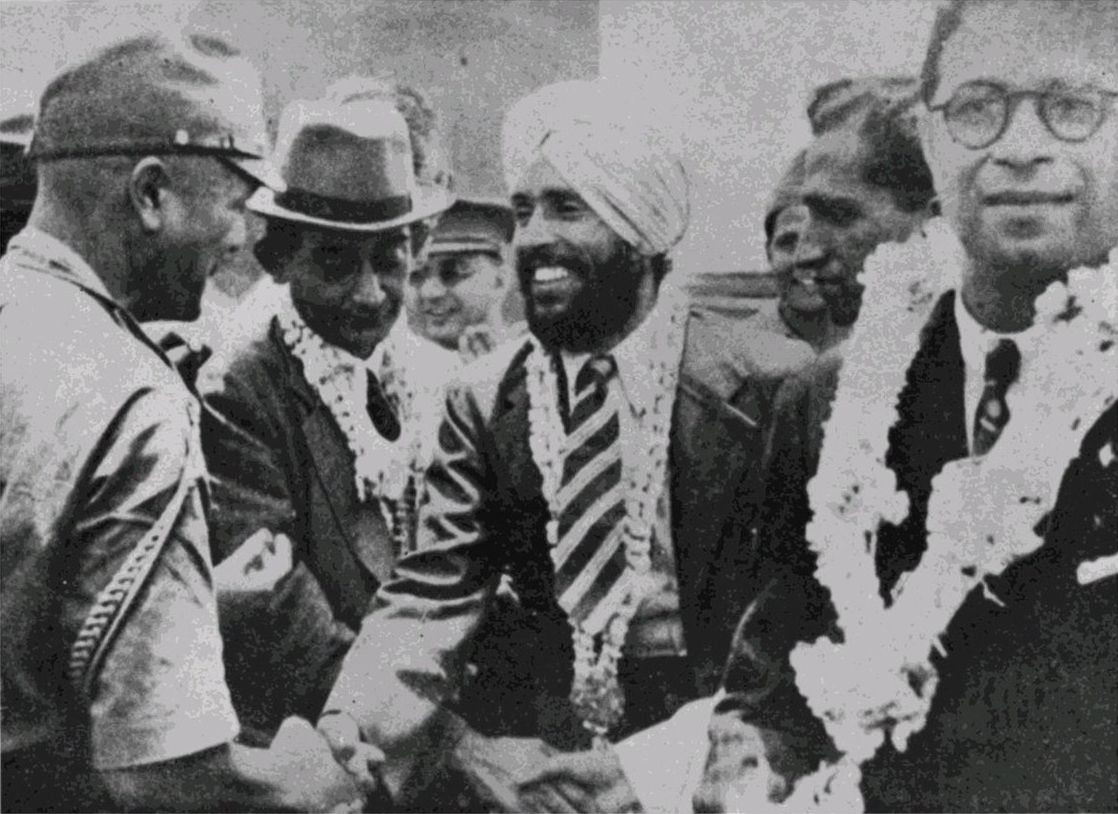
Captain Mohan Singh (in turban) of the Indian National Army being greeted by the Japanese Major Fujiwara Iwaichi, April 1942

Prior to the invasion of Malaya, Japanese intelligence officer Major Iwaichi Fujiwara had formed links with Pritam Singh Dhillon of the Indian Independence League. Fujiwara and Dhillon convinced Major Mohan Singh to form the Indian National Army (INA) with disaffected Indian soldiers captured during the Malayan Campaign. Singh was an officer in 1 Battalion of the 14th Punjab Regiment and had been captured after the Battle of Jitra. As the Japanese campaign progressed more Indian troops were captured with significant numbers being convinced to join the new force under Singh.

After the fall of Singapore, the army came into being. By 1 September 1942, it numbered 40,000 volunteers drawn from both former soldiers and civilians in Malaya and Singapore. Singh, now designated a general, was to command it. Already at a conference held in Bangkok during 15–23 June 1942, the Indian Independence League under the leadership of Rash Behari Bose, had appointed Singh its commander-in-chief.

Though Singh had a good relationship with Fujiwara he became disenchanted with some orders from the Imperial Japanese Army. This led to arrest on 29 December 1942, by the Kempeitai. With the return of Subhas Chandra Bose, from Germany in June 1943 the Indian National Army was revived in the form of Azad Hind Fauj. Bose organised finance and manpower under the cause for Indian independence among the expatriate Indian population. The INA had a separate women's unit, the Rani of Jhansi Regiment (named after Rani Lakshmi Bai) headed by Captain Lakshmi Swaminathan, which was seen as a first of its kind in Asia.

Even when faced with military reverses in the later stages of the war, Bose was able to maintain support for the Azad Hind movement.

==== Kesatuan Melayu Muda ====
Another link forged by Fujiwara was with Ibrahim Yaacob of Kesatuan Melayu Muda a pro-independence Malay organisation. On the eve of World War II, Yaacob and the members of Kesatuan Melayu Muda actively encouraged anti-British sentiment. With Japanese aid the organisation purchased the influential Singapore-based Malay publication Warta Malaya. Close to the time of the Japanese invasion Yaacob, Ishak Muhammad and a number of Kesatuan Melayu Muda leaders were arrested and imprisoned by the British.

During the Battle of Malaya, Kesatuan Melayu Muda members assisted the Japanese as they believed that the Japanese would give Malaya independence. When the Japanese captured Singapore, the arrested members were released by the Japanese. Mustapha Hussain, the organisation's vice-president and the others requested the Japanese grant Malaya independence but request was turned down. The Japanese instead disbanded Kesatuan Melayu Muda and established the Pembela Tanah Ayer (also known as the Malai Giyu Gun or by its Malay acronym PETA) militia instead. Yaacob was given the rank of lieutenant colonel in charge of the 2,000 man militia.

==== Atrocities ====
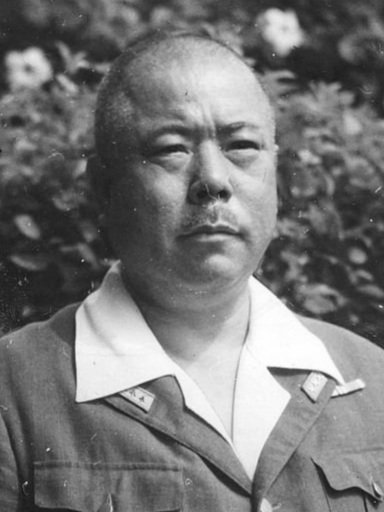
Lieutenant-General Tomoyuki Yamashita

Once the Japanese had taken Malaya and Singapore from the British their attention turned to consolidating their position. Of primary concern were the ethnic Chinese who were known to financially support both Nationalist and Communist forces in China fighting the Japanese. In December 1941 a list of key elements to eliminate within the Chinese population had been drawn up. On 17 February 1942 Lieutenant-General Tomoyuki Yamashita, commander of the 25th Army, ordered anti-Japanese elements within the Chinese be eliminated. The method employed had been used by the occupying divisions; the 5th, 18th, and Imperial Guards in earlier actions in China, whereby suspects were executed without trial. That same day 70 surviving soldiers of the Malay Regiment were taken out of the prisoner of war holding area at Farrer Park, Singapore by the Japanese to the battlefield at Pasir Panjang and shot. Some Malay Regiment officers were beheaded by the Japanese. An explanation given in a proclamation by Yamashita on 23 February 1942 was that they were dealing with rebellious Chinese. This message was elaborated on in a Syonan Times article of 28 February 1942 titled Sword that kills one and saves many.

Commencing in February in Singapore and then throughout Malaya a process of rounding up and executing those Chinese perceived as being threats began. This was the start of the Sook Ching massacres in which an estimated 50,000 or more ethnic Chinese were killed, predominantly by the Kempeitai.

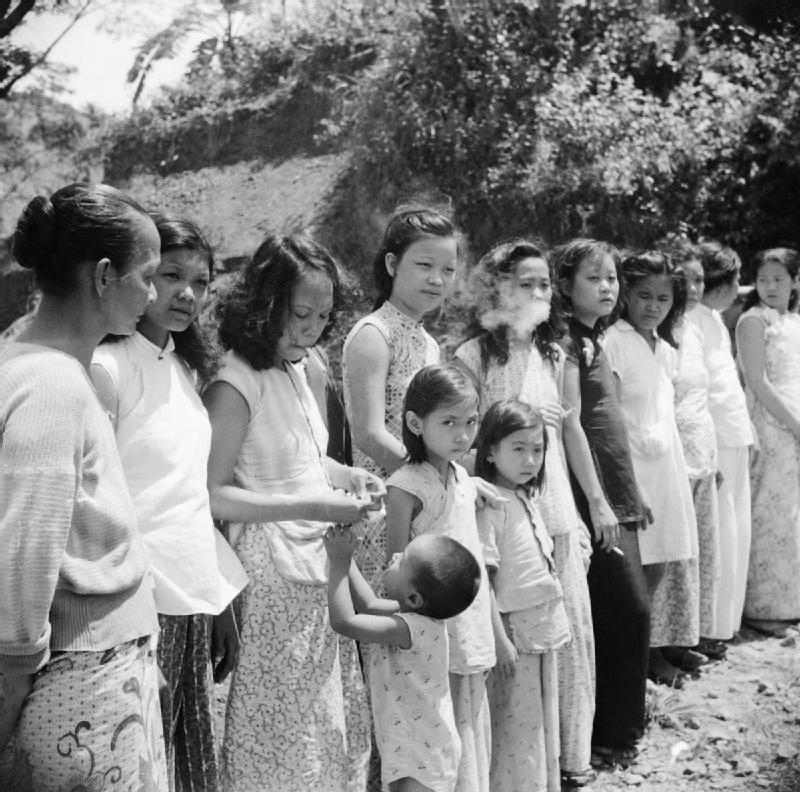
Liberated Penangite Malay and Chinese women at the Andaman Islands, forcefully taken by the Japanese to serve as comfort women

Specific incidents include Kota Tinggi, Johore on 28 February 1942 (2,000 killed); Gelang Patah, Johore on 4 March (300 killed); Benut, Johore on 6 March (number unknown); Johore Baharu, Senai, Kulai, Sedenak, Pulai, Rengam, Kluang, Yong Peng, Batu Pahat, Senggarang, Parit Bakau, and Muar between February and March (estimated up to 25,000 Chinese were killed in Johore); Tanjong Kling, Malacca on 16 March (142 killed); Kuala Pilah, Negeri Sembilan on 15 March (76 killed); Parit Tinggi, Negeri Sembilan on 16 March (more than 100 killed, the entire village); Joo Loong Loong (near the present village of Titi) on 18 March (1474 killed, entire village eliminated by Major Yokokoji Kyomi and his troops); and Penang in April (several thousand killed by Major Higashigawa Yoshinura). With increased guerrilla activity more massacres occurred, including Sungei Lui, a village of 400 in Jempol District, Negeri Sembilan, that was wiped out on 31 July 1942 by troops under a Corporal Hashimoto.

News of the Sook Ching massacres reached the west by February 1943, with Chinese sources stating that 97,000 suspected anti-Japanese Chinese had been imprisoned or killed by the Japanese in Singapore and Malaya. The same article also stated that the Japanese had set up mutual guarantee units whereby a group of 30 Chinese families would guarantee that none of their members would oppose the Japanese. If they did then the whole group was executed.

As is with the Changi Prison in Singapore, major civilian prisons throughout Malaya (such as the Pudu Prison and Taiping Prison) were reconstituted by the Japanese for use as detention and execution grounds. Various schools, including the Malay College at Kuala Kangsar, were also repurposed as interrogation facilities for the Japanese.

The Japanese were also accused of conducting medical experiments on Malayans, and were known to have taken Malay and Chinese girls and women to serve as comfort women.

Japanese raped Malay comfort women but UMNO leader Najib Razak blocked all attempts by other UMNO members like Mustapha Yakub at asking Japan for compensation and apologies.

The threat of Japanese rape against Chitty girls led Chitty families to let Eurasians, Chinese and full blooded Indians to marry Chitty girls and stop practising endogamy.

Japanese soldiers gang raped Indian Tamil girls and women they forced to work on the Burma railway and made them dance naked. 150,000 Tamils were killed on the railway by Japanese brutality. Tamils who got sick from cholera were executed by the Japanese. As Tamil women were raped by the Japanese, the Japanese soldiers contracted venereal disease like soft sore, syphilis and gonorrhoea and Thai women also spread those diseases to coolies on the railroad.

==== Hardships ====
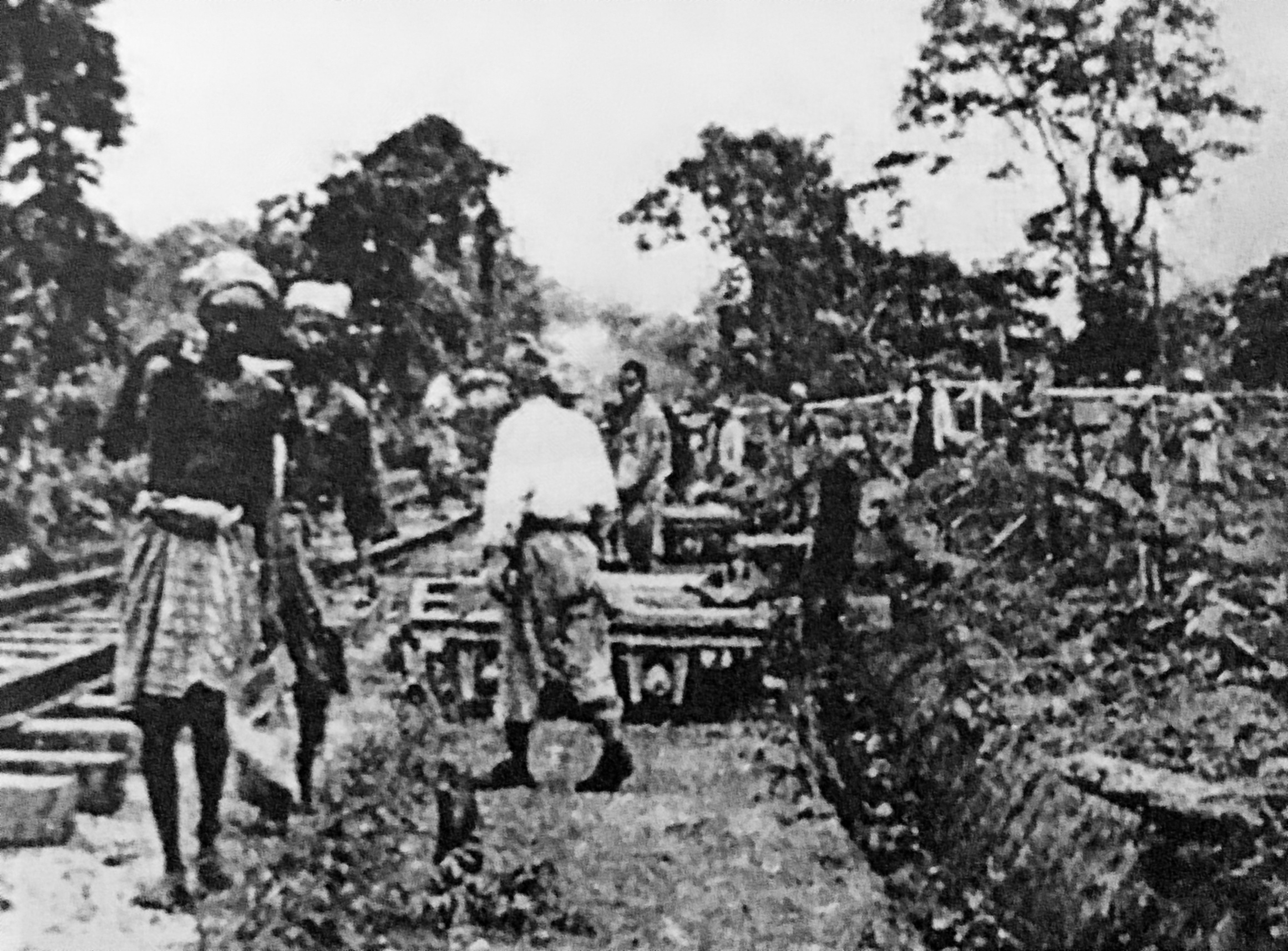
Malayan Tamils working on the Thai-Burma railway

The Japanese required the Chinese community through the Japanese controlled Overseas Chinese Organisation to raise Malaya $50 million as atonement for its support of the Chinese war effort. When the organisation only raised $28 million, the organisation was required to take out a loan for the balance.

All three races were encouraged to assist the Japanese war effort by providing finance and labour. Some 73,000 Malayans were thought to have been coerced into working on the Thai-Burma Railway, with an estimated 25,000 dying. The Japanese also took the railway track from Malacca and other branch lines for construction of the railway.

As the war progressed all three ethnic communities began to suffer deprivations from increasingly severe rationing, hyper-inflation, and a lack of resources. A blockade by Allied forces on the Japanese occupied territories coupled with a submarine campaign reduced the ability of the Japanese to move supplies between its occupied countries. Both the Malay and Indian communities gradually came into more conflict with the occupying Japanese prompting more joining the resistance movement, including Abdul Razak bin Hussein, and Abdul Rahman bin Hajih Tiab. Yeop Mahidin Bin Mohamed Shariff, a former Royal Malay Regiment officer, founded a Malay-based resistance group immediately after the fall of Singapore in February 1942.

==== Commerce ====
About 150,000 tons of rubber was taken by the Japanese, but this was considerably less than Malaya had exported prior to the occupation. Because Malaya produced more rubber and tin than Japan was able to utilize, Malaya's export income fell as it no longer had access to world markets. Real per capita income fell to about half its 1941 level in 1944 and less than half the 1938 level in 1945. A further factor was a lack of available merchant shipping, noticeable from early in 1942. As an alternative to shipping the Japanese sought to create a rail link from Malaya to Manchukuo.

Prior to the war, Malaya produced 40% of the world's rubber and a high proportion of the world's tin. It imported more than 50% of its rice requirements, a staple food for its population. The Allied blockade meant that both imports and the limited exports to Japan were dramatically reduced. In June 1943 tin was in short supply in Japan despite it occupying Malaya because of the transport problems.

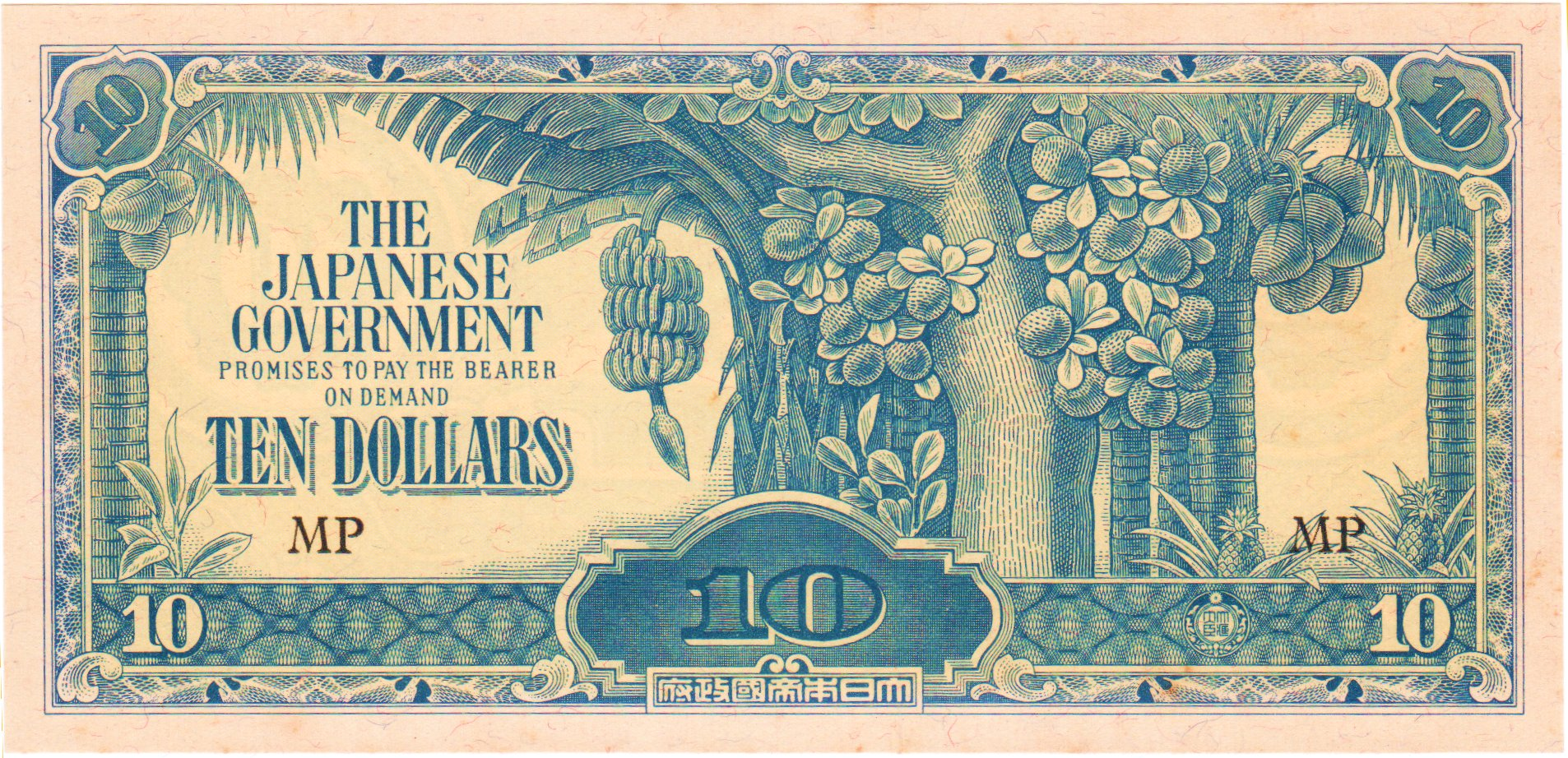
A ten dollar Japanese government-issued note used in Malaya and Borneo

During the occupation the Japanese replaced the Malayan dollar with their own version. Prior to occupation, in 1941, there was about Malaya $219 million in circulation. Japanese currency officials estimated that they had put $7,000 to $8,000 million into circulation during occupation. Some Japanese army units had mobile currency printing presses and no record was kept of the quantity or value of notes printed. When Malaya was liberated there was $500 million of uncirculated currency held by the Japanese in Kuala Lumpur. The unrestrained printing of banknotes in the final months of the war created hyperinflation with the Japanese money becoming valueless at the end of the war.

During the war the Allies dropped propaganda leaflets stressing that the Japanese issued money would be valueless when Japan surrendered. This tactic was suggested by Japanese policymakers as one of the reasons for the currencies falling value as Japanese defeats increased. Although a price freeze was put in place in February 1942, by the end of the war prices in Malaya were 11,000 times higher than at the start of the war. Monthly inflation reached over 40% in August 1945. Counterfeiting of the currency was also rife with both the British Special Operations Executive (SOE) printing $10 notes and $1 notes and the American Office of Strategic Services (OSS) printing $10 notes.

=== Resistance movements ===
Following the Japanese invasion of Malaya on 8 December 1941, the British colonial authorities accepted the Malayan Communist Party's (MCP) standing offer of military co-operation and on 15 December, all left-wing political prisoners were released. From 20 December, the British military began to train party members in guerrilla warfare at the hastily established 101st Special Training School (101st STS) in Singapore. About 165 MCP members were trained before the fall of Singapore to the Japanese. These fighters, scantily armed and equipped by the hard-pressed British, hurriedly dispersed and attempted to harass the occupying army.

Just before Singapore fell on 15 February 1942, the party began organise armed resistance in Johor. 4 armed groups, which became known as 'Regiments', were formed, with the 101st Special Training School's (101st STS) trainees serving as nuclei. In March, this force was dubbed the Malayan Peoples' Anti-Japanese Army (MPAJA) and began sabotage and ambushes against the Japanese. The Japanese responded with reprisals against Chinese civilians. These reprisals, coupled with increasing economic hardship, caused large numbers of Malayan Chinese to flee the cities. They became squatters at the forest margins, where they became the main source of recruits, food, and other assistance for the MPAJA. The MPAJA consolidated this support by providing protection.

In February 1942, Lai Teck, most likely a British agent who had infiltrated the Malayan Communist Party (MCP) was arrested by the Japanese. He became a double agent providing information to the Japanese on the MCP and MPAJA. Acting on information he provided the Japanese attacked a secret conference of more than 100 MCP and MPAJA leaders on 1 September 1942 at the Batu Caves, north of Kuala Lumpur, killing most of them. The loss of personnel forced the MPAJA to abandon its political commissar system, and the military commanders became the heads of the regiments. Following this setback and under the leadership of Lai Teck, the MPAJA avoided engagements and concentrated on consolidation, amassing 4,500 soldiers by early 1943. Lai Teck was not suspected as being a traitor until after the war. He was eventually tracked down and assassinated by Viet Minh operatives.

From May onward, British commandos from Force 136 infiltrated Malaya and made contact with the guerrillas. In 1944, an agreement was reached whereby the MPAJA would accept some direction from the Allied South East Asia Command (SEAC), and the Allies would give the MPAJA weapons and supplies. It was not until the spring of 1945, however, that significant amounts of material began to arrive by air drop.

Also operating at the same time as the MPAJA was the Pahang Wataniah, a resistance group formed by Yeop Mahidin. Mahadin had formed the group with consent of the Sultan of Pahang and set up a training camp at Batu Malim. The unit had an initial strength of 254 men and was assisted by Force 136, which assigned Major Richardson to help train the unit. Mahidin earned him the nickname "Singa Melayu" (Malay Lion) for his bravery and exploits. Between the Japanese surrender announcement and the return of the British the Wataniah provided protection for the Sultan from the MPAJA.

After the war ended the MPAJA was banned due to their communist ideologies and the Pahang Wataniah was reorganised, becoming the Rejimen Askar Wataniah, a territorial army.

=== Allied action in Malaya during occupation ===
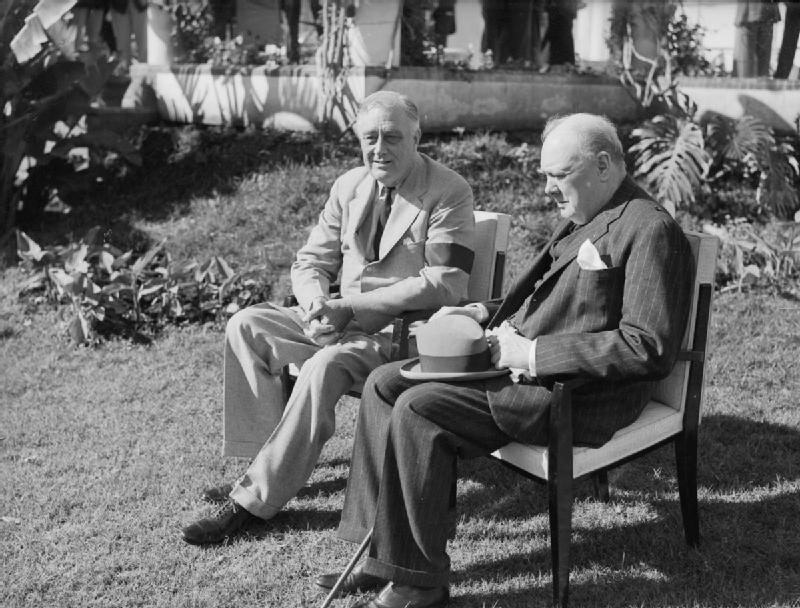
Roosevelt and Churchill in 1943

==== Allied strategic doctrine ====
The principles of Allied strategic doctrine in the event of Japan entering the war were established at a secret conference between 29 January 1941 and 27 March 1941. The strategy set forth the principle of Europe first, with the Far East being a defensive war. After the attack on Pearl Harbor, the British prime minister, Winston Churchill, and the American president, Franklin D. Roosevelt, met at the First Washington Conference. This conference reaffirmed the doctrine of Europe first. At the third Washington Conference in May 1943 alleviating pressure on China was discussed, in particular through the Burma campaign. At the Quebec Conference in August intensifying the war against Japan was decided and South East Asia Command reorganised. The Second Quebec Conference in September 1944 discussed the involvement of the British Navy against the Japanese.

==== Strategic bombing ====
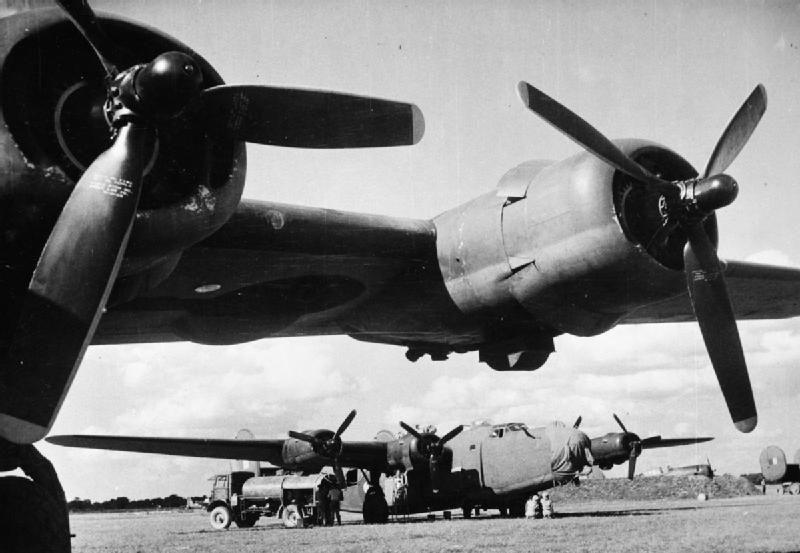
RAF B-24 Liberators

The first strategic bombing raid was carried out by American Flying Fortresses on 2 February 1942 against Kuantan and Kuala Lumpur's airfields. These may have been aircraft from the 7th Bombardment Group operating from Java.

Missions did not resume against Malaya until 27 October 1944 when B-24 Liberators of No. 159 Squadron RAF flying from Khargpur mined the Penang Strait causing its eventual abandonment by Japanese submarine forces. They laid more mines on 26 November and 23 January 1945.

On 11 January 1945 B-29s of the 20th Air Force attacked Penang. A further attack on Penang occurred on 24 February. This was followed by an attack on the marshaling yards in Kuala Lumpur and Alor Star airfield on 10 March. The Royal Selangor museum was hit by bombs on 15 March. The bombs were intended for the Kuala Lumpur marshaling yards. On 28 March mines were dropped in several harbours and the last Malaya mission by the 20th Air Force took place on 29 March several targets were attacked. Attacks on the ports ceased around this time as Mountbatten intended to use the ports during the proposed invasion of Malaya. Attacks continued against rail, coastal shipping and other targets.

==== Action in Malaya and the Straits of Malacca ====
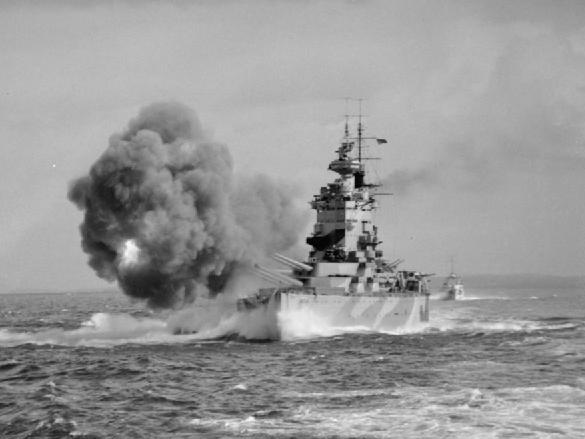
HMS Nelson led the task force preparing for Operation Zipper.

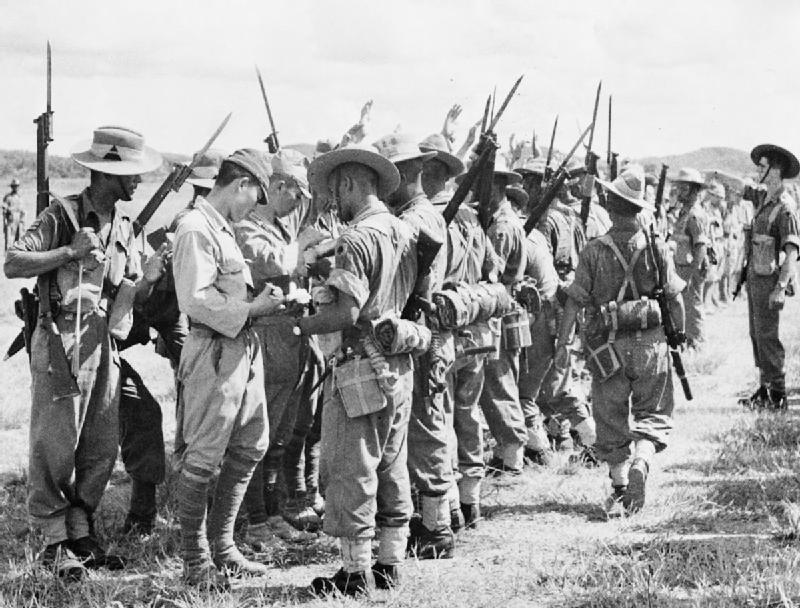
The 25th Indian Division search Japanese prisoners soon after they have been disarmed in Kuala Lumpur.

After the defeat by the Japanese, a number of Allied personnel and European civilians retreated into the jungle. Some, including the British woman, Nona Baker, joined the MPAJA. Others, such as Freddie Spencer Chapman, were Force 136 operatives who sought to begin a sabotage campaign against the occupying Japanese forces. In August 1943 the Allies set up South East Asia Command to oversee the war in South East Asia, including Malaya. As the war progressed further Allied operatives were landed either from submarine or be parachuted in to provide assistance to the resistance movements.

Allied navy units, particularly submarines, attacked Japanese shipping throughout the occupation and on occasion brought Force 136 operatives to Malaya. Air action was primarily confined to B-24 Liberators or Navy PB4Y Privateers supplying the resistance with arms and supplies, until late 1944 when B-29's of the US Twentieth Air Force carried out raids on installations at Penang and Kuala Lumpur. In May 1945 a British task force sank the Japanese cruiser Haguro in the Battle of the Malacca Strait.

Tun Ibrahim Ismail landed in Malaya in October 1944 as part of a Force 136 operation to convince the Japanese that the Allies were planning landings on the Isthmus of Kra, 650 miles to the north to establish a beachhead in Malaya under Operation Zipper. This was to be followed by a drive south to liberate Singapore, Operation Mailfist, and an offensive to retake northern Malaya designated Operation Broadsword. In preparation for the landings, a British task force sailed through the Straits of Malacca in July 1945 clearing mines and attacking Japanese facilities. British carrier borne aircraft attacked targets along the West Coast of Malaya and aircraft of the United States Seventh Fleet attacked targets on the East Coast as a prelude to Operation Zipper. Before the Operation could commence the war ended.

== Surrender ==
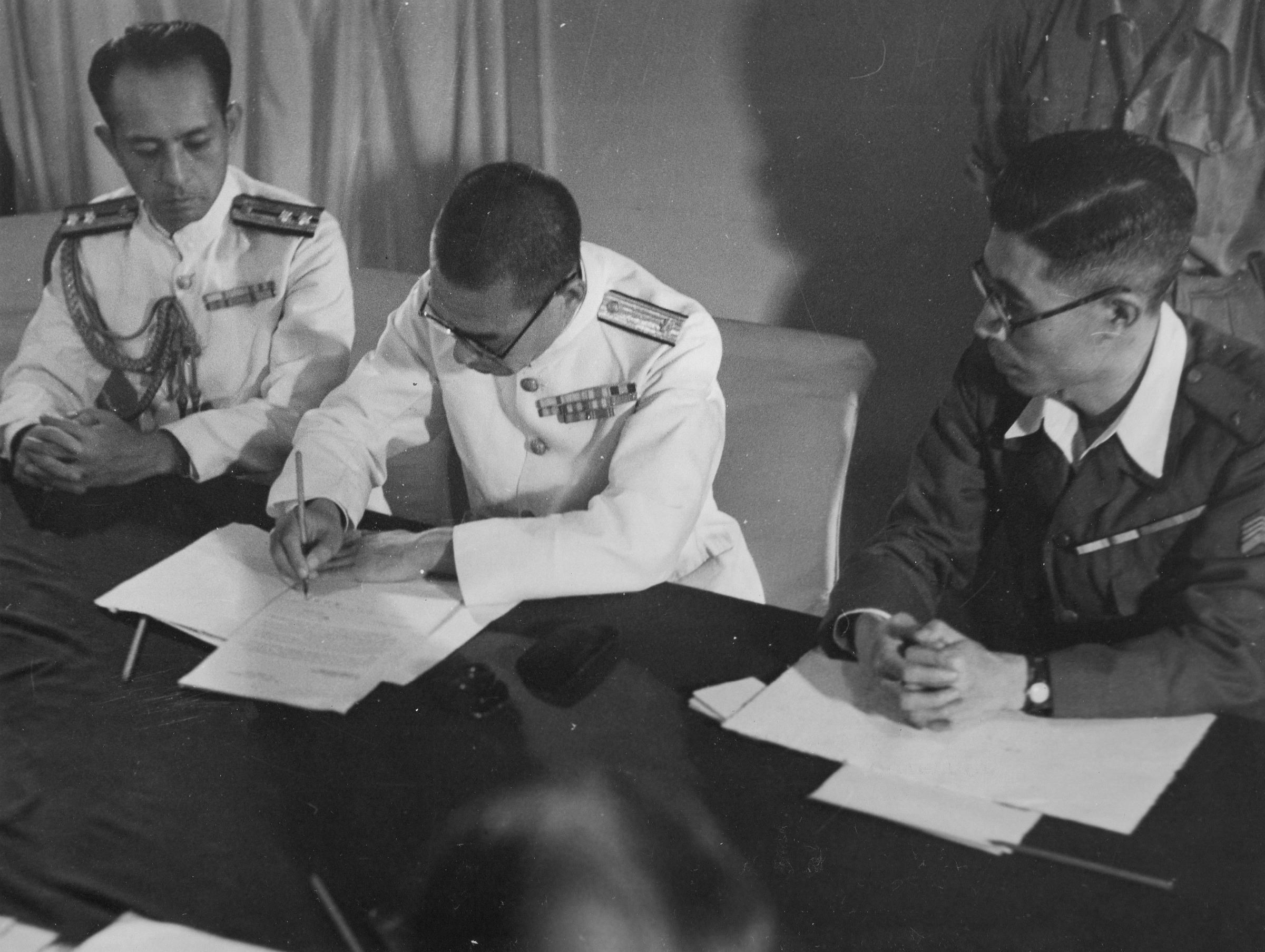
Signing the Penang surrender document on HMS Nelson as part of Operation Jurist

On 15 August 1945, emperor Hirohito gave a recorded radio address to the Empire announcing acceptance the terms for ending the war that the Allies had set down in the Potsdam Declaration. British B-24 and Mosquito bombers then undertook reconnaissance and leaflet drops over Malayan cities after the surrender announcement. One Mosquito bomber developed engine problems and was forced to land at the Japanese held Sungai Besi aerodrome near Kuala Lumpur. The Japanese provided assistance to the aircrews until they were picked up by another Mosquito.

In the period between the Emperor's announcement and the arrival of Allied forces in Malaya sporadic fighting broke out between the Chinese and Malay communities, particularly in Perak. The MPAJA launched reprisals against collaborators in the Malay police force and the civilian population and began to forcibly raise funds. Many in the rank and file advocated revolution. The cautious approach prevailed among the majority of the leadership at Lai Teck's instigation, a decision which would later be viewed as a major missed opportunity. A few of the Japanese occupation troops also came under attack from civilians during this period as they withdrew from outlying areas.

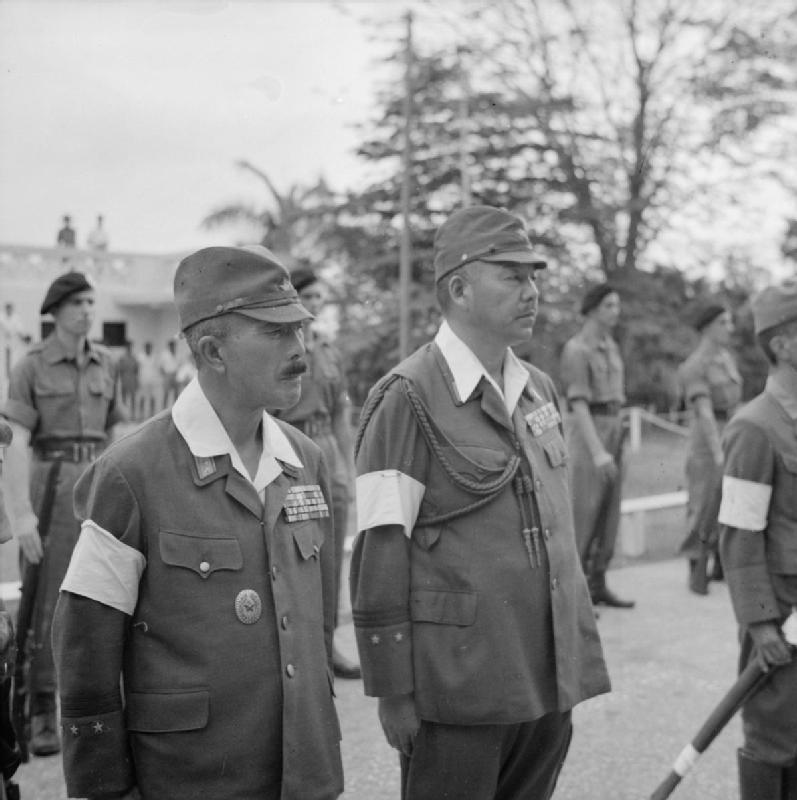
The third surrender ceremony on 22 February 1946 – General Itagaki, commander of the Japanese 7 Area Army, and his Chief of Staff, General Ayabe

Under Operation Jurist, Penang became the first state in Malaya to be liberated from Japanese rule. The Japanese garrison in Penang surrendered on 2 September 1945 aboard HMS Nelson and a party of the Royal Marines retook Penang Island the following day. The British subsequently recaptured Singapore, with the Japanese garrison on the island surrendering on 12 September. After the Singapore surrender, British forces reached Kuala Lumpur, where the Commander of the 29th Army surrendered on 13 September 1945. Another surrender ceremony was held in Kuala Lumpur on 22 February 1946 for General Itagaki, the Commander of the 7th Area Army.

On 12 September 1945, the British Military Administration (BMA) was installed in Kuala Lumpur. This was followed by the signing of the Malaya surrender document at Kuala Lumpur by Lieutenant-General Teizo Ishiguro, commander of the 29th Army; with Major-General Naoichi Kawahara, chief of staff; and Colonel Oguri as witnesses.

Later that year, the MPAJA reluctantly agreed to disband. Weapons were handed in at ceremonies where the wartime role of the army was praised.

== Aftermath ==
=== Repatriation ===
Japanese troops who remained in Malaya, Java, Sumatra, and Burma at the end of the war were transferred to Rempang and Galang Islands from October 1945 on to await repatriation to Japan. Galang was renamed Sakae by the troops. Lieutenant-General Ishiguro was put in charge of the island by the Allies under supervision of five British officers. More than 200,000 Japanese troops passed through the island under Operation Exodus. A newspaper reported that Kempeitai troops were mistreated by their compatriots. The last troops left the islands in July 1946.

In addition to Japanese troops, some 7,000 Japanese civilians who had lived in Malaya prior to or during the occupation were also repatriated to Japan.

=== War crimes ===
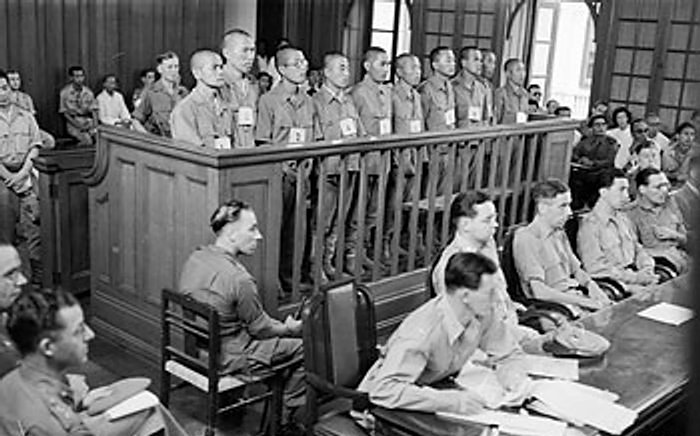
War crimes trial at Singapore

Members of the Kempeitai and camp guards were treated as prisoners of war because of their treatment of military and civilians. There were a number of war crimes trials. One held in 1947 found 7 Japanese officers guilty. Two were executed: Lieutenant Colonel Masayuki Oishi, commander of 2 Field Kempeitai and Lieutenant General Saburo Kawamura on 26 June 1947. Lieutenant General Takuma Nishimura, one of the five given life sentences, was later found guilty of the Parit Sulong Massacre by an Australian court and executed.

Captain Higashikawa, head of the Penang Branch of the Kempeitai, was executed. Higashikawa's actions were brutal enough for Captain S Hidaka, Penang Chief of Staff for the Imperial Japanese Navy, to raise the matter with Lieutenant-General Ishiguro. Ishiguro had Higashikawa transferred and replaced by Captain Terata.

Sergeant Eiko Yoshimura, the head of Kempeitai in Ipoh, was sentenced to death by hanging for the torture and abuse of civilians, including Sybil Kathigasu. Malay author Ahmad Murad Nasaruddin wrote a book, Nyawa di-hujong pědang, about her family's incarceration.

Others executed were Colonel Watanabe Tsunahiko, commander of the 11th Regiment by firing squad for his part in the Kuala Pilah massacre; and Captain Iwata Mitsugi, Second Lieutenant Goba Itsuto, and Second Lieutenant Hashimoto Tadashi by hanging at Pudu Jail on 3 January 1948.

=== War graves and memorials ===
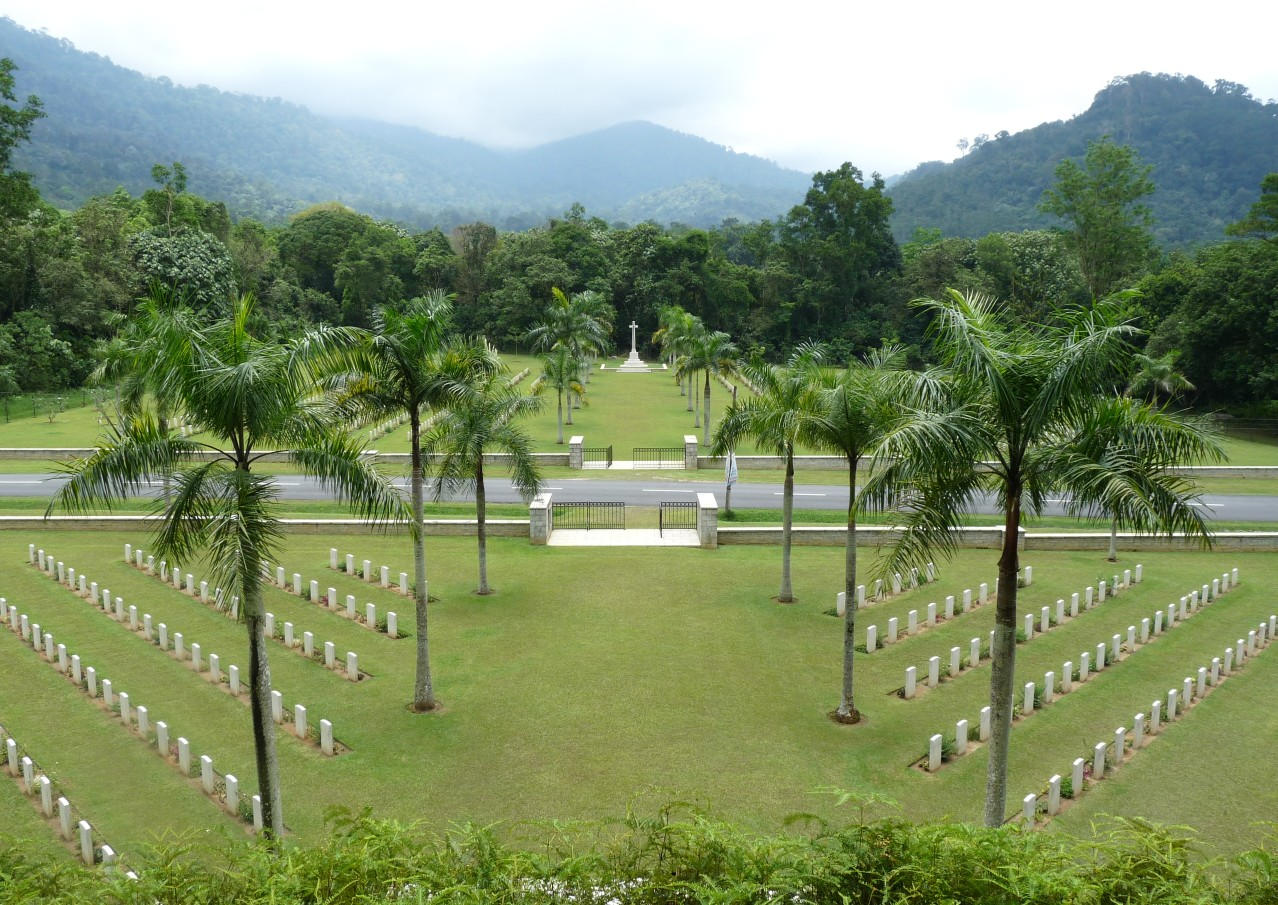
Taiping War Cemetery

Cemeteries for Malayan and Allied military personnel were created at Kranji War Cemetery in Singapore and Taiping War Cemetery in Bukit Larut (Maxwell Hill), Taiping, Perak. An expedition was mounted October 1946 by the Number 46 War Graves Unit to recover and rebury all personnel they could locate.

The main national war memorial is the National Monument in Kuala Lumpur. This memorial commemorates those who served in both World War Two and the Malayan Emergency that followed the war.

== See also ==
- Battle of Malaya
- Battle of Borneo (1941–42)
- Borneo campaign (1945)
- Battle of North Borneo
- Japanese invasion of Malaya
- Japanese occupation of Singapore
- Japanese occupation of British Borneo
- Japanese occupation of West Sumatra
- Sook Ching massacre
- Weeratunge Edward Perera
- British Military Administration (Malaya)
- Collaboration with the Empire of Japan
- Greater East Asia Co-Prosperity Sphere
