= 28th Division (Imperial Japanese Army) =

- Active: 1940–1945
- Country: Empire of Japan
- Branch: Imperial Japanese Army
- Type: Infantry
- Role: garrison
- Garrison/HQ: Shinkyō, Manchukuo
- Nickname(s): Abundant Division
- Engagements: Battle of Okinawa

Commanders
- Notable commanders: Teizo Ishiguro

The 28th Division (第28師団, Dai-nijūhachi Shidan) was an infantry division in the Imperial Japanese Army. Its call sign was the Abundant Division (豊兵団, Toyo Heidan). The 28th Division of the Kwantung Army was formed on 10 July 1940, in Manchukuo capital - Changchun.

== History ==
The 28th Division was tasked with the defense of the Manchukuo capital, and the neighboring areas of Harbin and Qiqihar under direct control of Kwantung Army.

With the start of the Battle of Saipan 15 June 1944, its 36th Infantry Regiment was sent to Saipan, but returned to division soon as Saipan was lost before 36th regiment could arrive. Simultaneously, the 28th Division was reassigned to the 32nd Army in June, 1944 and reassigned to the Ryukyu Islands, specifically to Miyakojima (where it based its headquarters) and Ishigaki archipelago. Its former garrison and some left-over troops were incorporated into 112th division.

In the Battle of Okinawa, the 28th Division main positions were never invaded, but were heavily bombed and subject to coastal bombardment. As all higher-ranking officers of the 32nd Army were killed, Naumi Toshiro, commander of the 28th Division, signed a surrender document for the 32nd Army after the surrender of Japan. The division was disbanded 13 December 1945.

== See also ==
- List of Japanese Infantry Divisions
- This article incorporates material from the Japanese Wikipedia page 第28師団 (日本軍), accessed 9 March 2016

== Reference and further reading ==
- Madej, W. Victor. Japanese Armed Forces Order of Battle, 1937-1945 [2 vols]

Allentown, PA: 1981
