= 94th Division (Imperial Japanese Army) =

- 第94師団
- Active: 1944 - 1945
- Country: Empire of Japan
- Allegiance: 29th army
- Branch: Imperial Japanese Army
- Type: Infantry
- Garrison/HQ: Kuala Lumpur
- Nickname: Intense division
- Engagements: none

Commanders
- Notable commanders: Tsunamasa Shidei

The 94th Division (第94師団, Dai-kyūjūsan Shidan) was an infantry division in the Imperial Japanese Army. Its call sign was the Intense Division (威烈兵団, Iretsu Heidan) (the first Japanese division with a two-letter call sign). It was created 14 October 1944 in Taiping, Perak. The nucleus for the formation were the 12 and 18th independent garrison groups. It was a triangular division.

== Action ==
The division was raised and incorporated into the 29th army on 16 October 1944 to bolster defences in Malaya after the Japanese Army's defeat at the Battle of Imphal. The division was to be used to defend Malaya against the expected Operation Zipper, and took a defensive positions on the north of Malaysia.

The division formally surrendered at Sungai Petani, Kedah on 8 October 1945 to Major General George N. Wood, commander of the 25th Indian Division, without engaging in any combat.

In November 1945, the engineer and transport regiment were sent to Rempang (in Riau Islands) and worked on infrastructure improvement, until been demobilized in Nagoya 30 May 1946.

== Commanders ==
- Lieutenant General Tsunamasa Shidei: October 16, 1944 - May 23, 1945
- Lieutenant General Yoshihisa Inoue (also translated as Inoue Yoshisa and Inoue Yoshisuke): May 23, 1945 - 1892

Inoue was born in 1892. He was Colonel in the Armored Warfare Department of the Ministry of War from 1941 to 1944. In 1944 he was first appointed to Commander - South Manchuria Arsenal and then Major-General of the 35th Independent Mixed Brigade. He died in 1980.

== Headquarters staff ==
- Chief of Staff: Colonel Eiji Imamura
- Chief of Staff: Lieutenant Kametaro Tominaga
- Chief of Staff: Major Shigero Fukuda
- Accounting Director: Lieutenant Colonel Shigeru Ninomiya, accountant

== References and further reading ==
- List of Japanese Infantry Divisions
- Madej, W. Victor. Japanese Armed Forces Order of Battle, 1937-1945 [2 vols] Allentown, PA: 1981
- Hata Yu 彦編 "Japanese army and navy comprehensive encyclopedia," second edition, University of Tokyo Press, 2005.
- Toyama Misao-Morimatsu Toshio eds "Imperial Army curriculum overview" Furong Shobo Publishing, 1987.
- "Separate volume history reader Senki series No.32 Pacific Division military history", Shinjinbutsuoraisha, 1996.

This article incorporates material from the article 第94師団 (日本軍) in the Japanese Wikipedia, retrieved on 24 June 2016.
