= Twenty-Ninth Army (Japan) =

Japanese Twenty-Ninth Army
- Active: January 6, 1944 - September 14, 1945
- Country: Empire of Japan
- Branch: Imperial Japanese Army
- Type: Infantry
- Role: Corps
- Garrison/HQ: Taiping, Malaya
- Nickname(s): Tei (定)

The Japanese 29th Army (第29軍, Dai-nijyūkyu gun) was an army of the Imperial Japanese Army occupying Malaya during the final days of World War II.

== History ==
The Japanese 29th Army was initially raised on January 6, 1944, at Taiping, Perak in Japanese-occupied Malaya as a garrison force, and in anticipation of any Allied attempt to invade and retake the Malay Peninsula. The army's headquarters was at what is now the Peking Hotel, 2 Jalan Idris, also the site of the Kempeitai Headquarters.

Initially under command of the Southern Expeditionary Army Group, the IJA 29th Army was transferred to the Japanese Seventh Area Army on March 27, 1944. The commanding officer was Lieutenant General Teizo Ishiguro. His chief of staff was Major General Masukura Fujimura. When Fujimura was transferred to the 13th Area Army on its formation on 1 February 1945, Major General Naokazu Kawahara became chief of staff. Kawahara had been commander of the 26th Mixed Brigade in Java.

As the war situation on the Pacific front grew increasingly desperate for Japan, the Imperial Japanese Army was unable to provide reinforcements and resupply to units south of the Philippines. After the surrender of Japan the 29th Army formally surrendered to Lieutenant-General Ouvry Roberts of the 34th Indian Corps at the Victoria Institution, Kuala Lumpur on 13 September 1945. Neither the 29th Army nor the 34th Indian Corps had seen combat. The 29th Army was then demobilized.

== List of Commanders ==
	Name	From	To
Commanding Officer	Lieutenant General Teizo Ishiguro	7 January 1944	September 1945
Chief of Staff	Major General Masukura Fujimura	7 January 1944	1 February 1945
Chief of Staff	Major General Naokazu Kawahara	1 February 1945	14 September 1945

== Final headquarters configuration at the end of the war ==
Commander: Ishiguro Teizo lieutenant general

- Chief of Staff: Kawahara Naokazu Major General
- Chief of Staff Deputy and military Affairs Director: Umezu Hirokichi Rear Admiral
- Staff: Oguri Army colonel two
- Adjutant: Ushio KuniNaru Colonel
- Weapons Director: Kawamura JunAkira Colonel
- Accounting Director: Yoshifumi Nomura accountant Colonel
- Surgeon General Manager: Ohtsubo YoshiNoboru surgeon Colonel
- Veterinary Director: Yano Yasuo veterinary Colonel
- Legal Director: Miki Yukio Legal Lieutenant Colonel

== Final units ==
94th Infantry Division raised in 1944 and under Lieutenant General Tsunamasa Shidei

- 35th Independent Mixed Brigade formed in Tokyo on 10 February 1944 stationed on the Andaman Islands under Lieutenant General Yoshitsugu Inoue. Sub-units were:

- 251st Independent infantry battalion
- 252nd Independent infantry battalion
- 253rd Independent infantry battalion
- 254th Independent infantry battalion
- 255th Independent infantry battalion
- 256th Independent infantry battalion
- 257th Independent infantry battalion
- Brigade artillery group
- Brigade engineer unit
- Brigade communication unit

- 36th Independent Mixed Brigade formed in Tokyo on 10 February 1944 and based on the Nicobar Islands under Major General Toshio Itsuki. Itsuki was executed as a war criminal on 3 May 1946.

- 258th Independent infantry battalion
- 259th Independent infantry battalion
- 260th Independent infantry battalion
- 261st Independent infantry battalion
- Brigade artillery group
- Brigade engineer unit
- Brigade communication unit

- 37th Independent Mixed Brigade formed in Osaka on 10 February 1944 under Major General Noboru Sato

- 262nd Independent infantry battalion
- 263rd Independent infantry battalion
- 264th Independent infantry battalion
- 265th Independent infantry battalion
- Brigade artillery group
- Brigade engineer unit
- Brigade communication unit

- 70th Independent Mixed Brigade formed in Saigon in December 1944 under Major General Oda Masato

- 428th Independent infantry battalion
- 429th Independent infantry battalion
- 430th Independent infantry battalion
- 431st Independent infantry battalion

- 15th Armoured Regiment (Kanikobaru Island): Fukuda Hayashisugi Lieutenant Colonel
- Independent tank 29 Battalion: Miyaji Tatsumi Major
- Independent field artillery 1st Battalion: Sakagami Shigeo Lieutenant Colonel
- 29th Army Military Police Corps (Taiping): in January 1944 3rd Field Kempeitai under Major-General Kojima Masanori (児島正範) replaced Lieutenant Colonel Oishi Masayuki 2nd Field Kempeitai
- Third communication Corps headquarters (Taiping)

Logistics troops

- 16th Field transport headquarters: Honma Kotaro Colonel
- Special car 16th Battalion

South eighth Army Hospital (Kuala Lumpur): Imamura SakuTakeshi surgeon Colonel

- Chapter 130 logistics hospital (Port Blair): Ito Hideo surgeon Lieutenant Colonel
- Chapter 131 logistics hospital (Kanikobaru Island): Junichi Watanabe surgeon Lieutenant Colonel
- Chapter 135 logistics hospital (Kamoruta Island): Inada Seiichi surgeon Colonel

29th Army Depot
29th Army Field arsenal
29th Army Field automobile Factory
29th Army Field cargo Factory

== Lieutenant General Teizo Ishiguro ==
Ishiguro (石黒貞蔵) was the former Commander of the 6th Army which had been based in Manchuria. In May 1944 the Army participated in Operation Ichi-Go On 1 July 1944 Ishiguro was appointed Commander of the newly formed 29th Army and based in Malaya in anticipation of an Allied attack.
