= Sixth Army (Japan) =

Japanese Sixth Army
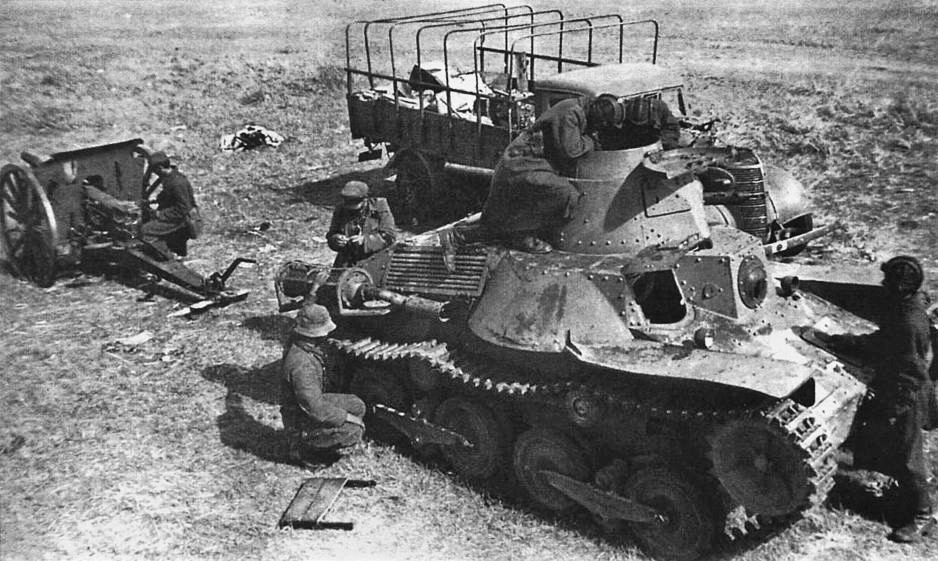
- Japanese Type 95 Ha-Go tank destroyed at Nomonhan
- Active: August 4, 1939 - August 15, 1945
- Country: Empire of Japan
- Branch: Imperial Japanese Army
- Type: Infantry
- Role: Corps
- Garrison/HQ: Hailar, Manchukuo
- Nickname(s): Mamoru (守, Protect)
- Engagements: Battle of Khalkhin Gol; Second Sino-Japanese War

The Japanese 6th Army (第6軍, Dai-roku gun) was an army of the Imperial Japanese Army initially based in Manchukuo as a garrison force under the overall command of the Kwantung Army. At the end of World War II it was active in east China.

== History ==
The Japanese 6th Army was initially raised on August 4, 1939 in Manchukuo as a garrison force to guard the western borders against possible incursions by the Soviet Red Army. It was a major participant in the Nomonhan Incident, during which time it took severe casualties. Afterwards, it was initially assigned to Hailar, in Inner Mongolia which was also the site of an extensive Japanese static military fortification system. During much of the Second Sino-Japanese War, it remained a reserve and training garrison force.

On January 26, 1945, the Japanese Sixth Army was reassigned to the control of the China Expeditionary Army, and was sent south to bolster Japanese forces in the strategic Wuhan-Changsha front, filling the gap left by the departure of Japanese forces in the southward Operation Ichi-Go thrust. At the surrender of Japan, it was disbanded at Hangzhou, Zhejiang province, China.

== List of commanders ==
=== Commanding officer ===
	Name	From	To
1	Lieutenant General Rippei Ogisu	1 August 1939	6 November 1939
2	Lieutenant General Touji Yasui	6 November 1939	15 October 1941
3	Lieutenant General Seiichi Kita	15 October 1941	1 March 1943
4	Lieutenant General Teizo Ishiguro	1 March 1943	7 January 1944
5	Lieutenant General Jiro Sogawa	7 January 1944	September 1945

=== Chief of Staff ===
	Name	From	To
1	Lieutenant General Tetsukuma Fujimoto	1 August 1939	2 December 1940
2	Lieutenant General Minoru Sasaki	2 December 1940	1 July 1942
3	Lieutenant General Takeshi Mori	1 July 1942	3 February 1943
4	Major General Takashi Iketa	3 February 1943	25 February 1944
5	Major General Ryoichi Kudo	25 February 1944	September 1945
