= Teizo Ishiguro =

Japanese military personnel (1887–1950)

- 石黒 貞蔵
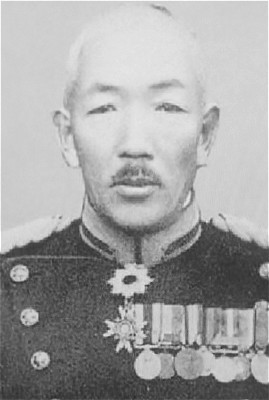
- Born: October 15, 1887; Tottori Prefecture, Japan
- Died: January 8, 1950 (aged 62)
- Education: Imperial Japanese Army Academy
- Relatives: Takuro (son)
- Military career
- Allegiance: Empire of Japan
- Branch: Imperial Japanese Army
- Service years: 1907–1945
- Rank: Lieutenant General
- Units: 40th Infantry Regiment; Toyama Army School; Shimoshizu Army Flight School; 1st Regiment; Toyohashi Reserve Officer Training School; Kwantung Army
- Commands: 2nd Regiment; 7th Brigade; 28th Division; 6th Army; 29th Army
- Conflicts: Second Sino-Japanese War; World War II; Operation Ichi-Go
- Awards: Order of the Golden Kite, 3rd Class
- Other work: Author of Joshin no Tsuki (浄心の月)

Teizo Ishiguro (石黒 貞蔵, Ishiguro Teizo; October 15, 1887 – January 8, 1950), was a lieutenant-general in the Imperial Japanese Army of military personnel commanding first the 6th Army in 1943 and then the 29th Army in Malaya until the end of the war. He held the Isao tertiary Order of the Golden Kite.

== Career ==
Born in Tottori Prefecture, Teizo attended Tottori Junior High School. He attended a Military Academy in May 1907 and become a second lieutenant in the 40th Infantry Regiment after his graduation. Teizo became an infantry instructor rising to the rank of major by March 1924.

He served at the Toyama Army School and the Shimoshizu Army Flight School. Appointed a lieutenant-colonel in the 1st Regiment of the 1st Division in August 1929, Teizo was transferred to the Toyohashi Reserve Officer Training School in 1932. In 1933 he was a Governmental advisor to Kwantung Army and in 1934 its Kempeitai Training.

In 1936 he was commander of the 2nd Regiment of the 14th Division and in 1938 he was promoted to major-general commanding the 7th Brigade of the 7th Division. In 1939 he became commandant, Toyohashi Military Preparatory School and in 1940, being promoted to lieutenant general, commander of the 28th Division based in Shinkyō (Changchun).

On 1 March 1943 he was appointed commander of the 6th Army based in Hailar replacing General Seiichi Kita. In May 1944 the 6th Army participated in Operation Ichi-Go. On 1 July 1944, he was appointed commander of the newly formed 29th Army and based in Malaya in anticipation of an Allied attack. Ishiguro died on 8 January 1950.

== Family ==
His son, Takuro, was an Army captain who was killed in action. This may be partially incorrect as there is a 1st Lieutenant Takuro Ishiguro of the 34th Sentai who was killed in action during the bombing of Wewak on 20 August 1943. He could have been posthumously promoted to the rank of captain as this was not unusual in the Japanese military.

Ishigoro wrote a book on his experiences, Joshin no Tsuki' (浄心の月), published by Kawamata Kankosha, Mito City, Ibaraki Prefecture.

== See also ==
- Ikuhiko Hata ed., "Japan army and navy comprehensive encyclopedia" second edition, University of Tokyo Press, 2005.
- Hideki Fukugawa "Japanese Army generals Dictionary" Furong Shobo Publishing, 2001.
- Toyama Misao-hen "Army and Navy general personnel overview Army Hen" Furong Shobo Publishing, 1981.
