= Soviet–Japanese War =

1945 Soviet invasion of Manchukuo

- Part of the Second Sino-Japanese War and the Pacific Theater of World War II
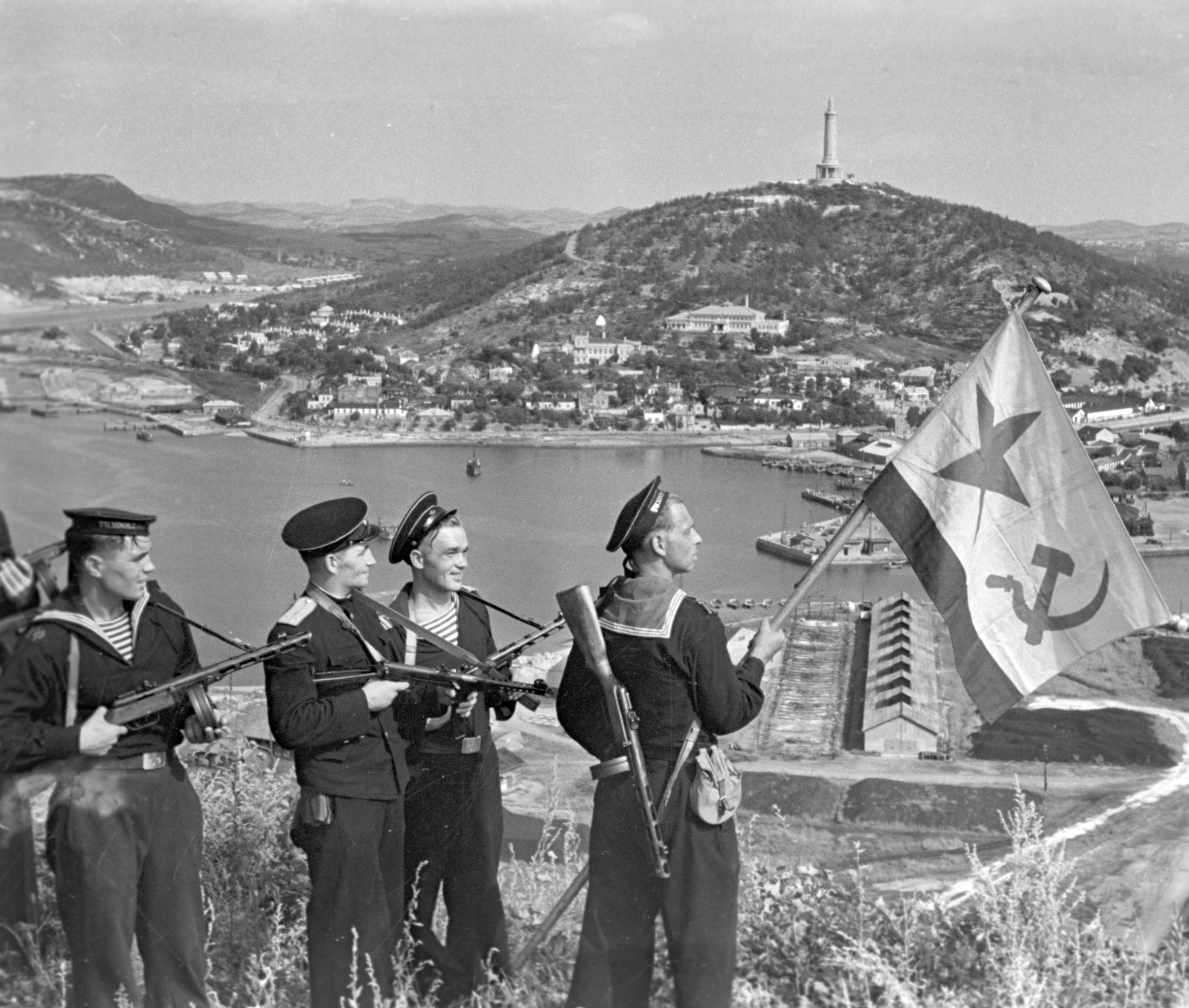
- From top to bottom, left to right: Residents of Mudanjiang greet Soviet soldiers; Mongolian armored brigade with T-34 tanks on the march; Soviet BA-10 crossing near the Greater Khingan Pass; Japanese soldiers at a machine gun post along the Amur River in Manchuria; Sailors of the Amur Flotilla with captured Japanese flags; Pacific Fleet naval infantrymen raise the Soviet naval ensign over Ryojun (Port Arthur, today Lüshunkou)
Date	8 August – 2 September 1945 (3 weeks and 4 days)
Location	Northeast China, Inner Mongolia, Sakhalin, the Kuril Islands, and northern Korea
Result	Soviet victory
Territorial changes	Soviet occupation of Inner Mongolia and Manchuria until 1946; Soviet annexation of South Sakhalin and the Kuril Islands; Partition of the Korean Peninsula at the 38th parallel

Belligerents
Soviet Union; Mongolia	Japan; Manchukuo; Wang Jingwei regime; Mengjiang

Commanders and leaders
(Soviet Union) Joseph Stalin: (Soviet Union) Aleksandr Vasilevsky; (Soviet Union) Rodion Malinovsky; (Soviet Union) Kirill Meretskov; (Soviet Union) Maksim Purkayev; (Soviet Union) Alexander Novikov; (Soviet Union) Nikolay Kuznetsov; (Soviet Union) Ivan Yumashev; (Mongolian People's Republic) Khorloogiin Choibalsan; (Mongolian People's Republic) Lkhagvasuren Jamiyan	Hirohito (surrendered); (Empire of Japan) Otozō Yamada (surrendered); (Empire of Japan) Seiichi Kita (surrendered); (Empire of Japan) Jun Ushiroku (surrendered); (Empire of Japan) Kiichiro Higuchi (surrendered); (Empire of Japan) Fusaki Tsutsumi (surrendered); (Manchukuo) Puyi (surrendered); (Manchukuo) Zhang Jinghui (surrendered); (Mengjiang) Demchugdongrub (surrendered)

Units involved
(Soviet Union) Transbaikal Front: 17th Army; 36th Army; 39th Army; 53rd Army; 6th Guards Tank Army; (Mongolian People's Republic) MPA Cavalry Group; 12th Air Army; (Soviet Union) 1st Far Eastern Front: 1st Red Banner Army; 5th Army; 25th Army; 35th Army; 10th Mechanized Corps; 9th Air Army; (Soviet Union) 2nd Far Eastern Front: 2nd Red Banner Army; 15th Army; 16th Army; 5th Separate Rifle Corps; Chuguevsk Group; Amur Military Flotilla; NKVD Border Troops; 10th Air Army	(Empire of Japan) Kwantung Army: First Area Army; 3rd Army; 5th Army; Third Area Army; 30th Army; 44th Army; Independent units; 4th Army; 34th Army; Seventeenth Area Army; (Empire of Japan) Fifth Area Army Manchukuo Imperial Army; Mengjiang National Army

Strength
Soviet Union: 1,577,225 men; 26,137 artillery; 1,852 sup. artillery; 5,556 tanks and self-propelled artillery; 5,368 aircraft; Mongolia: 16,000 men (Note: The 5th, 6th, 7th and 8th Cavalry Divisions of the People's Revolutionary Army, Special Cavalry Committees, 7th Mechanized Armored Brigade, Tank, Artillery, Road Transport and Communications Special Committees, Air Force Division, and the main unit of the special branch of chemical engineering. border military detachments, outposts, and units of the People's Self-Defense Voluntary Cavalry Detachment)	Japan: c. 1,092,400 men (Note: According to statistics compiled in 1964 by the Japanese Ministry of Health and Welfare's Relief Bureau, by 22 August 1945 there were 665,500 military personnel remaining in Manchuria, 335,900 in Korea, and 91,000 in Sakhalin, the Kuril Islands, and the Aleutian Islands. These numbers do not appear to factor in casualties incurred during the Soviet-Japanese War, because the total for Army personnel in Manchuria, 664,000, almost exactly corresponds to the total given in JM-155 for the Kwantung Army minus the 34th Army in Korea, 663,625.: 2,012 aircraft (635 combat)) (Note: There were an additional 8 Japanese aircraft involved in the Battle of Shumshu.); Manchukuo: 200,000 troops; Mengjiang: 44,000 men

Casualties and losses
Soviet: 30,253 combat casualties, including: 9,780 killed; 911 missing; 1,340 non-combat deaths; 24,425 sanitary losses, including: 19,562 wounded; 4,863 sick; Mongolian: 72 irrecoverable; 125 wounded, sick, injured; 36,653 total casualties; 78 tanks and SPGs; 62 combat aircraft; 232 guns and mortars	Japanese sources: 22,300–23,600 killed; est.40,000 wounded; Soviet claim: 83,737 killed; 20,000 wounded (Manchuria only); < 41,199 captured (19 August) (Note: 41,199 is the listed total of Japanese soldiers in Soviet custody on 19 August, two days after the surrender of the Kwantung Army by order of Hirohito and four days after Hirohito announced the surrender of Japan. Post-war, 594,000 to 609,000 Japanese soldiers ended up in Soviet custody.); 640,000 captured and disarmed (total)

The Soviet–Japanese War (Note: (Russian: Советско-японская война; Japanese: ソ連対日参戦, romanized: soren tai nichi sansen; Chinese: 苏日战争) Known in Mongolia as the Liberation War of 1945 (Mongolian: 1945 оны чөлөөлөх дайн, romanized: 1945 ony chölöölökh dain)) was a campaign of the Second World War that began with the Soviet invasion of Manchuria following the Soviet declaration of war against Japan on 8 August 1945. The Soviet Union and Mongolian People's Republic toppled the Japanese puppet states of Manchukuo in Manchuria and Mengjiang in Inner Mongolia, as well as northern Korea, Karafuto on the island of Sakhalin, and the Kuril Islands. The Soviet Union's declaration of war helped bring about the Japanese surrender and the end of World War II by undermining Japanese plans to appeal to Moscow to mediate an end to the war on favorable terms.

== Summary ==
At the Tehran Conference in November 1943, Joseph Stalin agreed that the Soviet Union would enter the war against Japan once Germany was defeated.

An Anglo-American delegation visited Moscow in October 1944 to discuss the Soviet Union joining the war against Japan. The meeting with Stalin on 15 October discussed the Soviet Union's participation, and Stalin said that the Soviet offensive could need American material assistance because of the limited freight capacity of the Trans-Siberian Railway; see Pacific Route. British participants included Winston Churchill, Anthony Eden, Field Marshal Sir Alan Brooke, and General Hastings Ismay. The American representative was W. Averell Harriman.

At the Yalta Conference in February 1945, Stalin agreed to Allied pleas to enter World War II in the Pacific Theater within three months of the end of the war in Europe.

On 26 July, the US, the UK, and China made the Potsdam Declaration, an ultimatum calling for the Japanese surrender that if ignored would lead to their "prompt and utter destruction".

The commencement of the invasion fell between the US atomic bombings of Hiroshima on 6 August and Nagasaki on 9 August. Although Stalin had been told virtually nothing of the US and UK's atomic bomb program by Allied governments, the date of the invasion was foreshadowed by the Yalta Agreement, the date of the German surrender (on 9 May 1945, implying a deadline for Stalin to enter the war against Japan by 9 August 1945), and the fact that, on 3 August, Marshal Aleksandr Vasilevsky reported to Stalin that, if necessary, he could attack on the morning of 5 August. The timing was well-planned and enabled the Soviet Union to enter the Pacific Theater on the side of the Allies, as previously agreed, before the war's end. The proposed Soviet invasion of Hokkaido was originally planned to be part of the territory taken.

At 5 p.m. Moscow time (11 p.m. Trans-Baikal time (UTC+9)) on 8 August 1945, Soviet foreign minister Vyacheslav Molotov informed Japanese ambassador Naotake Satō in the Kremlin that the Soviet Union had declared war on Japan, and that from 9 August the Soviet Government would consider itself to be at war with Japan. At one minute past midnight Trans-Baikal time on 9 August 1945, or just over an hour after the declaration of war, the Soviets commenced their invasion simultaneously on three fronts to the east, west and north of Manchuria. The operation was subdivided into smaller operational and tactical parts:

- Khingan–Mukden Offensive Operation (9 August 1945 – 2 September 1945)
- Harbin–Kirin Offensive Operation (9 August 1945 – 2 September 1945)
  - Battle of Mutanchiang
  - Siege of Hutou Fortress
- Sungari Offensive Operation (9 August 1945 – 2 September 1945)

and subsequently

- South Sakhalin Operation (11 August 1945 – 25 August 1945)
  - Soviet assault on Maoka (19 August 1945 – 22 August 1945)
- Chongjin Landing Operation (13 August 1945 – 16 August 1945)
- Kuril Landing Operation (18 August 1945 – 1 September 1945)
  - Battle of Shumshu

Though the battle extended beyond the traditional lands of the Manchu people, the coordinated and integrated invasions of Japan's northern territories has also been called the Battle of Manchuria. Since 1983, the operation has sometimes been called Operation August Storm, after United States Army historian Lieutenant Colonel David Glantz used this title for a paper on the subject. It has also been referred to by its Soviet name, the Manchurian Strategic Offensive Operation, but this name refers more to the Soviet invasion of Manchuria than to the whole war.

This offensive should not be confused with the Soviet–Japanese border conflicts (particularly the Battle of Khalkhin Gol of May–September 1939), that ended in Japan's defeat in 1939, and led to the Soviet–Japanese Neutrality Pact.

== Background and buildup ==
The Russo-Japanese War of the early 20th century resulted in a Japanese victory and the Treaty of Portsmouth by which, in conjunction with other later events including the Mukden Incident and Japanese invasion of Manchuria in September 1931, Japan eventually gained control of Korea, Manchuria and South Sakhalin. In the late 1930s were a number of Soviet-Japanese border incidents, the most significant being the Battle of Lake Khasan (Changkufeng Incident, July–August 1938) and the Battle of Khalkhin Gol (Nomonhan Incident, May–September 1939), which led to the Soviet–Japanese Neutrality Pact of April 1941. The Neutrality Pact freed up forces from the border incidents and enabled the Soviets to concentrate on their war with Germany and the Japanese to concentrate on their southern expansion into Asia and the Pacific Ocean.

With success at the Battle of Stalingrad and the eventual defeat of Germany becoming increasingly certain, the Soviet attitude to Japan changed, both publicly, with Stalin making speeches denouncing Japan, and covertly, with the Soviets building up forces and supplies in the Far East. At the Tehran Conference (November 1943), Stalin, Churchill, and Roosevelt agreed that the Soviet Union would enter the war against Japan once Germany was defeated. Stalin faced a dilemma since he wanted to avoid a two-front war at almost any cost but also wanted to extract gains in the Far East as well as Europe. The only way that Stalin could make Far Eastern gains without a two-front war would be for Germany to surrender before Japan.

The Soviet–Japanese Neutrality Pact caused the Soviets to make it policy to intern Allied aircrews who landed in Soviet territory after operations against Japan, but airmen held in the Soviet Union under such circumstances were usually allowed to "escape" after some period of time. Nevertheless, even before the defeat of Germany, the Soviet buildup in the Far East had steadily accelerated. By early 1945, it had become apparent to the Japanese that the Soviets were preparing to invade Manchuria, but they were unlikely to attack prior to Germany's defeat. In addition to their problems in the Pacific, the Japanese realised that they needed to determine when and where a Soviet invasion would occur.

At the Yalta Conference (February 1945), Stalin secured from Roosevelt the promise of Stalin's Far Eastern territorial desires in return for agreeing to enter the Pacific War within two or three months of the defeat of Germany. By mid-March 1945, things were not going well in the Pacific for the Japanese, who withdrew their elite troops from Manchuria to support actions in the Pacific. Meanwhile, the Soviets continued their Far Eastern buildup. The Soviets had decided that they did not wish to renew the Neutrality Pact. The Neutrality Pact required that twelve months before its expiry, the Soviets must advise the Japanese and so on 5 April 1945, they informed the Japanese that they did not wish to renew the treaty. That caused the Japanese considerable concern, but the Soviets went to great efforts to assure the Japanese that the treaty would still be in force for another twelve months and that the Japanese had nothing to worry about.

On 9 May 1945 (Moscow Time), Germany surrendered and so if the Soviets were to honour the Yalta Agreement, they would need to enter war with Japan by 9 August 1945. The situation continued to deteriorate for the Japanese, now the only Axis power left in the war. They were keen to remain at peace with the Soviets and extend the Neutrality Pact and also wanted to achieve an end to the war. Since Yalta, they had repeatedly approached or tried to approach the Soviets to extend the Neutrality Pact and to enlist the Soviets in negotiating peace with the Allies. The Soviets did nothing to discourage the Japanese hopes and drew the process out as long as possible but continued to prepare their invasion forces. One of the roles of the Cabinet of Admiral Baron Suzuki, which took office in April 1945, was to try to secure any peace terms short of unconditional surrender. In late June, they approached the Soviets (the Neutrality Pact was still in place), inviting them to negotiate peace with the Allies in support of Japan, providing them with specific proposals and in return, they offered the Soviets very attractive territorial concessions. Stalin expressed interest, and the Japanese awaited the Soviet response. The Soviets continued to avoid providing a response. The Potsdam Conference was held (in the Soviet-occupied German city of Potsdam) from 16 July to 2 August 1945. On 24 July, the Soviet Union recalled all embassy staff and families from Japan. On 26 July, the conference produced the Potsdam Declaration whereby Churchill, Harry S. Truman and Chiang Kai-shek (the Soviet Union was not officially at war with Japan) demanded the unconditional surrender of Japan. The Japanese continued to wait for the Soviet response and avoided responding to the declaration.

The Japanese had been monitoring Trans-Siberian Railway traffic and Soviet activity to the east of Manchuria and the Soviet delaying tactics, which suggested to them that the Soviets would not be ready to invade east Manchuria before the end of August. They did not have any real idea and no confirming evidence as to when or where any invasion would occur. They had estimated that an attack was not likely in August 1945 or before spring 1946, but Stavka had planned for a mid-August 1945 offensive and had concealed the buildup of a force of 90 divisions. Many had crossed Siberia in their vehicles to avoid straining the rail link.

== Combatant forces ==
=== Soviets ===
The Far East Command, under Vasilevsky, had a plan for the conquest of Manchuria that was simple but huge in scale by calling for a massive pincer movement over all of Manchuria. The pincer movement was to be performed by the Transbaikal Front from the west and by the 1st Far East Front from the east. The 2nd Far East Front was to attack the center of the pocket from the north. The only Soviet equivalent of a theater command that operated during the war (apart from the short-lived 1941 "Directions" in the west), Far East Command, consisted of three Red Army fronts.

Each Front had "front units" attached directly to the front, instead of an army. The forces totaled 89 divisions with 1.5 million men, 3,704 tanks, 1,852 self-propelled guns, 85,819 vehicles, and 3,721 aircraft. One third of its strength was in combat support and services. Its naval forces contained 12 major surface combatants, 78 submarines, numerous amphibious craft, and the Amur River flotilla, consisting of gunboats and numerous small craft. The Soviet plan incorporated all the experience in maneuver warfare that the Soviets had acquired fighting the Germans, and also used new improved weapons, such as the RPD light machine gun, the new main battle tank T-44 and a small number of JS-3 heavy tanks.

==== Western Front of Manchuria ====
The Transbaikal Front, under Marshal Rodion Malinovsky, was to form the western half of the Soviet pincer movement and to attack across the Inner Mongolian desert and over the Greater Khingan mountains. These forces had the objective to secure Mukden (now Shenyang), then meet troops of the 1st Far East Front at the Changchun area in south-central Manchuria and so end the double envelopment.

==== Eastern Front of Manchuria ====
The 1st Far East Front, under Marshal Kirill Meretskov, was to form the eastern half of the pincer movement. The attack involved striking towards Mudanjiang (or Mutanchiang), and once that city was captured, the force was to advance towards the cities of Jilin, Changchun, and Harbin. Its final objective was to link up with forces of the Trans-Baikal Front at Changchun and Jilin thus closing the double envelopment movement.

As a secondary objective, the 1st Far East Front was to prevent Japanese forces from escaping to Korea and to then invade the Korean Peninsula up to the 38th parallel, establishing in the process what later became North Korea.

==== Northern Front of Manchuria ====
The 2nd Far East Front, under General Purkayev, was in a supporting attack role. Its objectives were the cities of Harbin and Qiqihar and the prevention of an orderly withdrawal to the south by Japanese forces.

Once troops from the 1st Far East Front and Trans-Baikal Front had captured the city of Changchun, the 2nd Far East Front was to attack the Liaotung Peninsula and seize Port Arthur (present day Lüshun).

=== Japanese ===
The Kwantung Army of the Imperial Japanese Army, under General Otozō Yamada, was the major part of the Japanese occupation forces in Manchuria and Korea and consisted of two Area Armies: the First Area Army (northeastern Manchukuo) and the Third Area Army (southwestern Manchukuo), as well as three independent armies (responsible for northern Manchuria, North Korea, Mengjiang, South Sakhalin, and the Kurils).

Each area army (Homen Gun, the equivalent of a Western "army") had headquarters units and units attached directly to it, in addition to the field armies (the equivalent of a Western corps). In addition was the 40,000-strong Manchukuo Defense Force, composed of eight weak, poorly equipped, and poorly trained Manchukuoan divisions.

The combined forces of the Kwantung Army in Manchuria and the Seventeenth Area Army in Korea came close to one million men. The two armies had no fewer than 31 divisions and 13 brigades (including two tank brigades) between them, together with numerous separate regiments and fortress units. In Manchuria alone there were approximately 700 armored vehicles and 5,000 guns and mortars (excluding 50 mm grenade dischargers), while the Japanese Air Forces had 2,004 planes in Manchuria and Korea, of which only 627 were combat types. The Imperial Japanese Navy did not contribute surface forces to the defense of Manchuria, the occupation of which it had always opposed on strategic grounds. Additionally, by the time of the invasion, the few remnants of its fleet were stationed in defense of the Japanese home islands in anticipation of a possible invasion by Western Allied forces, however, IJN Naval Infantry units from 12th Air Fleet saw extensive action during the South Sakhalin and Kuril Islands campaigns. Despite its large size, the Kwantung Army was badly trained, poorly equipped, and had only limited supplies: overall ammunition stockpiles were sufficient to meet the needs of only 13 divisions for 3 months, compared with 24 divisions then in Manchuria. Most of its heavy equipment and all of its best troops had been transferred to the Pacific Front over the previous three years, with second-rate units raised to replace them. As a result, it had essentially been reduced to a light infantry counterinsurgency force with limited mobility or ability to fight a conventional land war against a co-ordinated enemy.

Compounding the problem, the Japanese military made many wrong assumptions and major mistakes, the two most significant being the following:

- They wrongly assumed that any attack coming from the west would follow either the old rail line to Hailar or head into Solun from the eastern tip of Mongolia. The Soviets attacked along those routes, but their main attack from the west went through the supposedly impassable Greater Khingan range south of Solun and into the center of Manchuria.
- Japanese military intelligence failed to determine the nature, location, and scale of the Soviet buildup in the Far East. Based on initial underestimates of Soviet strength and the monitoring of Soviet traffic on the Trans-Siberian Railway, the Japanese believed that the Soviets would not have sufficient forces in place before the end of August and that an attack was most likely in the autumn of 1945 or the spring of 1946.

The withdrawal of the Kwantung Army's elite forces for redeployment into the Pacific Theatre made new operational plans for the defence of Manchuria against a seemingly inevitable Soviet attack prepared by the Japanese in the summer of 1945. They called for the redeployment of most forces from the border areas, which were to be held lightly with delaying actions. The main force was to hold the southeastern corner in strength to defend Korea from attack.

Furthermore, the Japanese had observed Soviet activity only on the Trans-Siberian Railway and along the East Manchurian front and so prepared for an invasion from the east. They believed that when an attack occurred from the west, their redeployed forces would be able to deal with it.

Although the redeployment had been initiated, it was not supposed to be completed until September and so the Kwantung Army was in the process of redeployment when the Soviets launched their attack simultaneously on all three fronts.

== Campaign ==
The operation was carried out as a classic double pincer movement over an area the size of Western Europe. In the western pincer, the Red Army advanced over the deserts and mountains from Mongolia, far from their resupply railways. That confused the Japanese military analysis of Soviet logistics, and the defenders were caught by surprise in unfortified positions. The Kwantung Army commanders, involved in a planning exercise at the time of the invasion, were away from their forces for the first 18 hours of conflict. Communication infrastructure was poor, and communication was lost with forward units very early. The Kwantung Army had a formidable reputation as fierce and relentless fighters, and even though weak and unprepared, they put up strong resistance in the town of Hailar, which tied down some of the Soviet forces. At the same time, Soviet airborne units were used to seize airfields and city centers in advance of the land forces and to ferry fuel to the units that had outrun their supply lines. Due to Japanese 37mm and 47mm anti-tank guns only being suitable for fighting light Soviet tanks, the Japanese employed suicide bomber squads strapped with grenades and explosives as their improvised anti-tank weapon. At the same time, there were reports saying that Japanese Army aviation were using kamikaze planes in an attempt to stop the Soviet advance. The Soviet pincer from the east crossed the Ussuri and advanced around Khanka Lake and attacked towards Suifenhe. Although Japanese defenders fought hard and provided strong resistance, the Soviets proved to be overwhelming.

Nevertheless, the prospect of a quick defeat to the Japanese Army seemed far from clear. Given the fanatical and sometimes suicidal resistance put up by the Japanese forces similar in April–June 1945 Battle of Okinawa, there was every reason to believe that a long, difficult campaign for the capture of the last remaining Japanese fortified areas was expected. In some parts of the Soviet offensive, these expectations were fully fulfilled.

Attacks from the Soviet Union overpowered Japanese forces. From behind Japanese lines, Soviet paratroopers decimated the Kwantung Army as Japanese anti-tank bullets bounced off the sides of Soviet tanks. After launching a crushing offensive on the Japanese Kwantung Army in Manchuria just days before Japan's surrender, the Russians handled the Japanese with the worst cruelty. Japanese troops in Manchuria retreated out of fear. The exact situation occurred in Inner Mongolia, except the Soviet forces were largely Mongols from Outer Mongolia. The Japanese forces in Inner Mongolia didn't resist the Soviet forces, abandoned their city stronghold of Kalgan, and fled south.

Soviet forces captured Japanese soldiers and physically fit Japanese men in Manchuria and transferred them to Siberia to perform slave labor, where many of them would die from the cold weather. From the Soviet perspective, this was seen as revenge for Russia's defeat in the Russo-Japanese War of 1905. Japanese evacuees fled to Beijing, and told stories of the Soviet forces' mistreatment of the Japanese, which sparked panic among the Japanese populace. Nevertheless, the Russians stayed out of China proper in accordance with their agreement with Chiang Kai-shek.

On 18 August, several Soviet amphibious landings had been conducted ahead of the land advance: three in northern Korea, one in South Sakhalin, and one in the Chishima Islands. In Korea at least, there were already Soviet soldiers waiting for the troops coming overland. In Karafuto and the Chishimas, that meant a sudden and undeniable establishment of Soviet sovereignty.

On 10 August, the US government proposed to the Soviet government to divide the occupation of Korea between them at the 38th parallel north. The Americans were surprised that the Soviet government accepted. Soviet troops were able to move freely by rail, and there was nothing to stop them from occupying the whole of Korea. Soviet forces began amphibious landings in northern Korea by 14 August and rapidly took over the northeast of the peninsula, and on 16 August, they landed at Wonsan. On 24 August, the Red Army entered Pyongyang and established a military government over Korea north of the 38th parallel. American forces landed at Incheon on 8 September and took control of the south.

== Aftermath ==
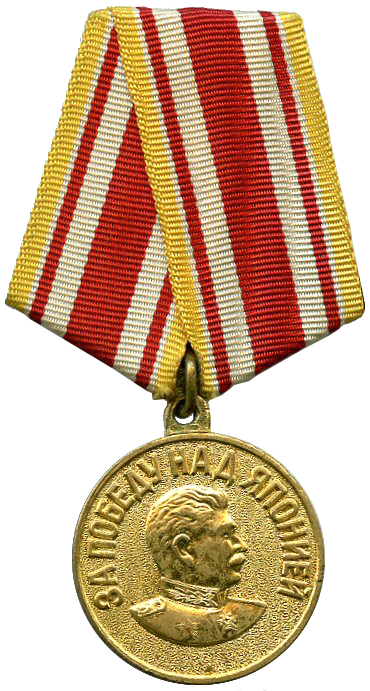
About 1,831,000 Soviet personnel were awarded the Medal "For the Victory over Japan" following 30 September 1945.

Since the first major Japanese military defeats in the Pacific in the summer of 1942, the civilian leaders of Japan had come to realise that the Japanese military campaign was economically unsustainable, as Japan did not have the industrial capacity to fight the United States, China, and the British Empire at the same time, and there were a number of initiatives to negotiate a cessation of hostilities and the consolidation of Japanese territorial and economic gains. Hence, elements of the non-military leadership had first made the decision to surrender as early as 1943. The major issue was the terms and conditions of surrender, not the issue of surrender itself. For a variety of diverse reasons, none of the initiatives was successful, the two major reasons being the Soviet Union's deception and delaying tactics and the attitudes of the "Big Six", the powerful Japanese military leaders.

=== Impact on the Japanese decision to surrender ===
The Manchurian Strategic Offensive Operation, along with the atomic bombings of Hiroshima and Nagasaki, combined to break the Japanese political deadlock and force the Japanese leaders to accept the terms of surrender demanded by the Allies.

In the "Sixty Years after Hiroshima" issue of The Weekly Standard, the American historian Richard B. Frank points out that there are a number of schools of thought with varying opinions of what caused the Japanese to surrender. He describes what he calls the "traditionalist" view, which asserts that the Japanese surrendered because the Americans dropped the atomic bombs. He goes on summarize other points of view in conflict with the traditionalist view: namely, that the Japanese government saw their situation as hopeless and was already ready to surrender before the atomic bombs –and that the Soviets went to war against Japan.

Tsuyoshi Hasegawa's research has led him to conclude that the atomic bombings were not the principal reason for Japan's capitulation. He argues that Japan's leaders were impacted more by the swift and devastating Soviet victories on the mainland in the week after Stalin's 8 August declaration of war because the Japanese strategy to protect the home islands was designed to fend off an Allied invasion from the south and left virtually no spare troops to counter a Soviet threat from the north. Furthermore, the Japanese could no longer hope to achieve a negotiated peace with the Allies by using the Soviet Union as a mediator with the Soviet declaration of war. That, according to Hasegawa, amounted to a "strategic bankruptcy" for the Japanese and forced their message of surrender on 15 August 1945. Others with similar views include the Battlefield series documentary, among others, but most, including Hasegawa, state that the surrender was not caused by only one factor or event.

Ward Hayes Wilson, however, has argued extensively that the Soviet declaration of war was the sole cause of Japan's surrender. He cites the June 1945 meeting of the Supreme Council at which they concluded that maintaining Soviet neutrality would "determine the fate of the Empire," and the general lack of regard for the importance of city bombing in Japan's ruling circles.

=== Soviet occupation ===
The Soviet invasion and occupation of the defunct Manchukuo marked the start of a traumatic period for the more than one million residents of the puppet state who were of Japanese descent. The situation for the Japanese military occupants was clear, but the Japanese colonists who had made Manchukuo their home, particularly those born in Manchukuo, were now stateless and homeless, and the (non-Japanese) Manchurians wanted to be rid of these foreigners. Many residents were killed, and others ended up in Siberian prisons for up to 20 years. Some made their way to the Japanese home islands, where they were also treated as foreigners.

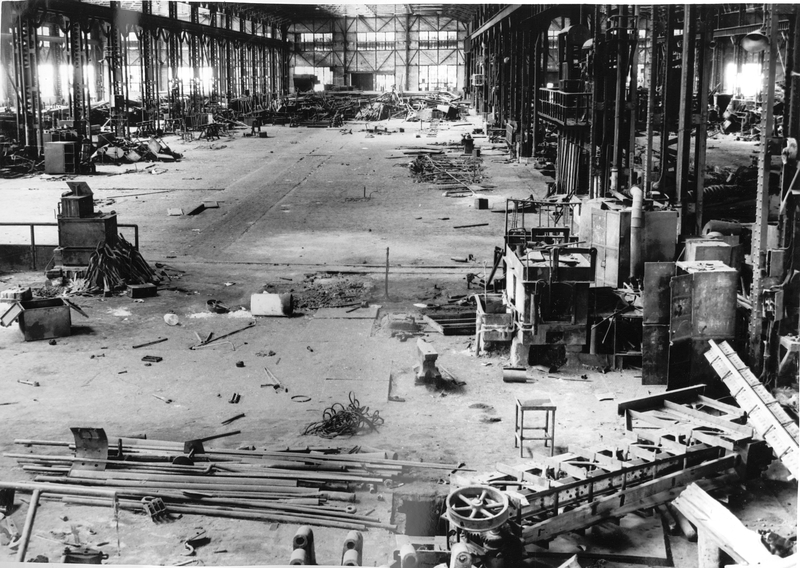
Manchuria Sumitomo Metal Industries in Anshan looted by the Red Army.

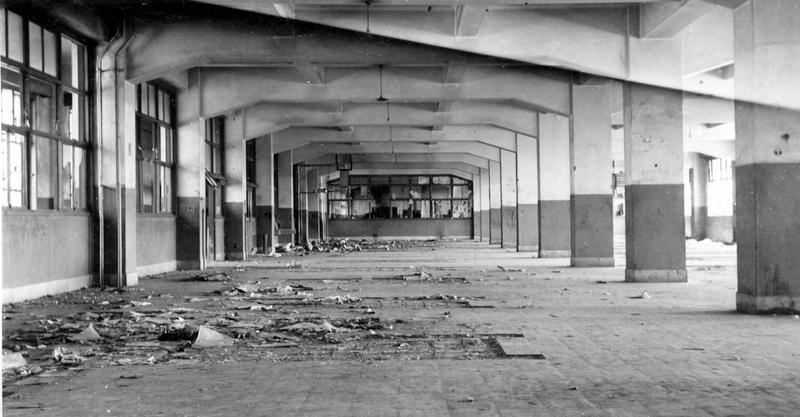
A Manchurian government printing plant in Changchun completely pillaged by the Red Army.

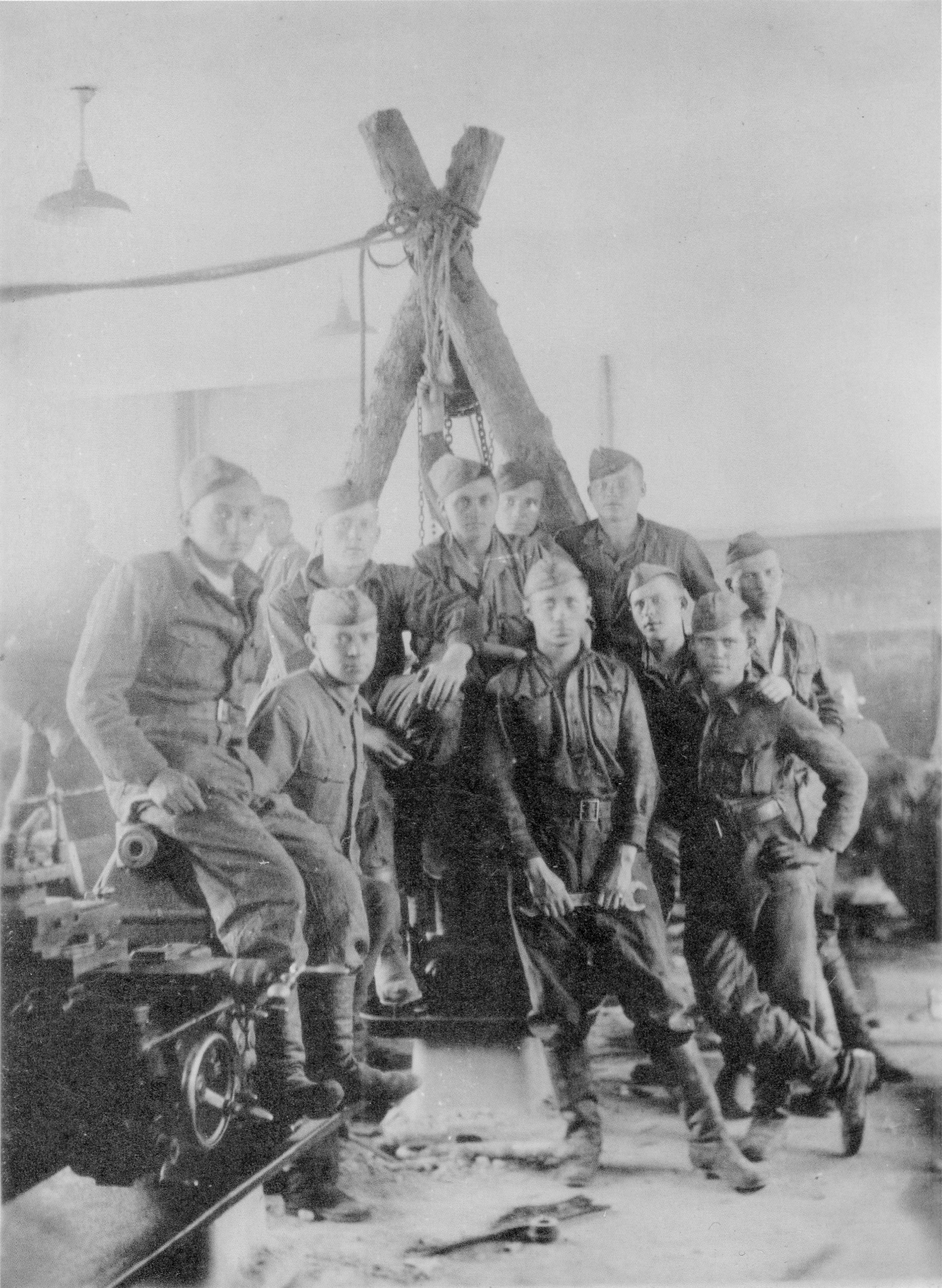
Soviet soldiers pillaging manufacturing machines from a factory in Manchuria.

Manchuria was "cleansed" by Soviet forces of any potential military resistance. With Soviet support for the spread of communism, Manchuria provided the main base of operations for Mao Zedong's forces, who proved victorious in the following four years of the Chinese Civil War. The military successes in Manchuria and China by the Communist Chinese led to the Soviet Union giving up their rights to bases in China, promised by the Western Allies, because all of the land deemed by the Soviets to be Chinese, as distinct from what the Soviets considered to be Soviet land that had been occupied by the Japanese, was eventually turned over to the People's Republic of China.

Prior to withdrawing from Manchuria, Soviet forces and bureaucracy dismantled almost all of the portable parts of the considerable Japanese-built industry in Manchuria and relocated it to "restore industry in war-torn Soviet territory". However, anything that was not portable was either disabled or destroyed since the Soviets had no desire for Manchuria to be an economic rival, particularly to the underdeveloped Far Eastern Soviet Territories. After the Communist victory in the Chinese Civil War and the establishment of the People's Republic of China in 1949, the USSR began providing economic assistance to the new government, the bulk of which went into rebuilding Manchuria's industrial base.

As agreed at Yalta, the Soviet Union had intervened in the war with Japan within three months of the German surrender and so was therefore entitled to annex the territories of South Sakhalin, which Russia had lost to Japan in aftermath of the Russo-Japanese War, and the Kuril Islands and also to preeminent interests over Port Arthur and Dalian, with its strategic rail connections, via the China Changchun Railway, a company owned jointly by China and the Soviet Union that operated all railways of the former Manchukuo. The territories on the Asian mainland were transferred to the full control of the People's Republic of China in 1955. The other possessions are still administered by the Soviet Union's successor state, Russia. The annexation of South Sakhalin and the Kuril Islands is of great importance as the Sea of Okhotsk became a Soviet inland sea, which continues to have great strategic benefit to Russia.

The division of Korea between the Soviet and US occupations led to the creation of the separate states of North and South Korea, a precursor to the Korean War five years later.

== See also ==
- Battles of Khalkhin Gol
- Battle of Mutanchiang
- Battle of Shumshu
- Military history of Japan
- Military history of the Soviet Union
- Kuril Islands dispute
- Project Hula
- Soviet–Japanese border conflicts
- Monument to the Victory over Japan
