= Battle of Mutanchiang =

1945 Soviet-Japanese battle in Manchuria

- Part of the Soviet invasion of Manchuria of World War II
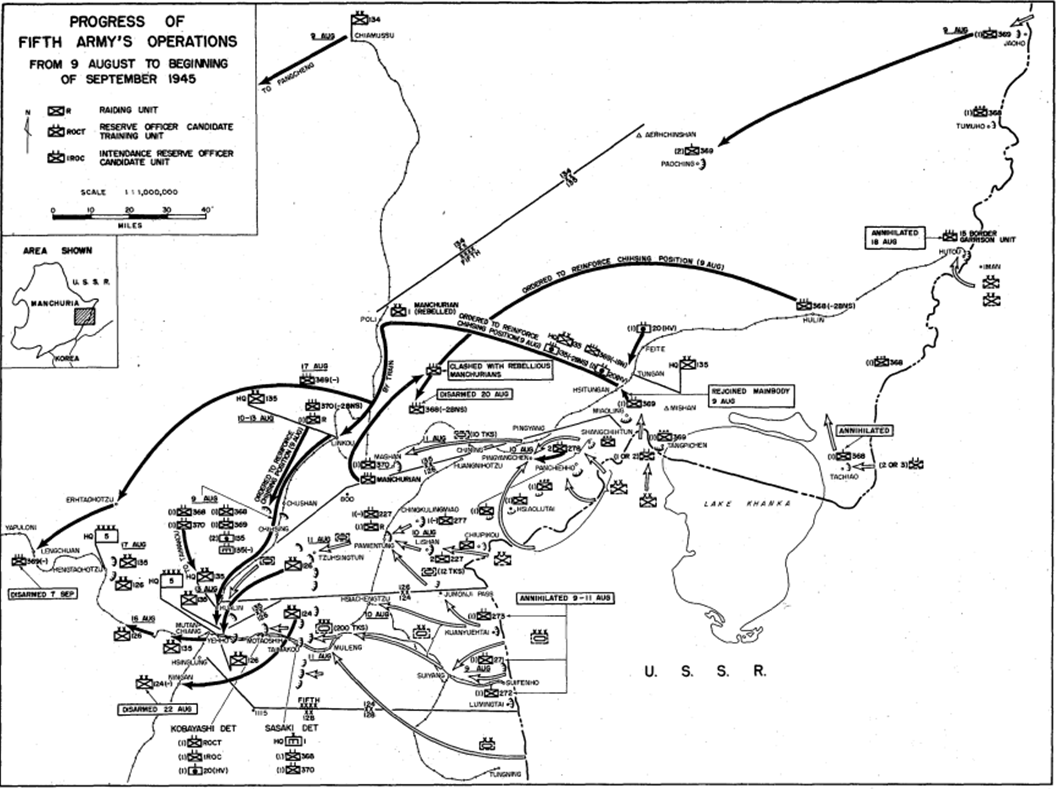
- Mutanchiang campaign map, August 1945
Date	12–16 August 1945
Location	Mutanchiang, Manchuria
Result	Soviet victory Japanese defensive success: Japanese delayed the Soviet advance, allowing most of their main forces to safely retreat

Belligerents
Soviet Union	(Empire of Japan) Japan; Manchukuo

Commanders and leaders
(Soviet Union) Kirill Meretskov (Soviet Union) Nikolay Krylov (Soviet Union) Afanasy Beloborodov	(Empire of Japan) Seiichi Kita (Empire of Japan) Shimizu Tsunenori

Units involved
1st Far Eastern Front: 5th Army; 1st Red Banner Army	First Area Army: Fifth Army

Strength
~290,000 soldiers (Note: According to Glantz, the 1st Far Eastern Front contained approximately 587,000 personnel in four armies, two of which were directly involved in the battle.); 1,102 tanks and SP guns 4,790 artillery pieces	55,000–60,000; 4 or more light armored cars or tanks

Casualties and losses
Manpower; 12,000 casualties Materiel; 400 tanks destroyed	Manpower; 20,000–25,000 total casualties including 9,391 killed Materiel; 104 artillery pieces 4 light armored cars 600 trucks 6,000 horses

The Battle of Mutanchiang, or Battle of Mudanjiang, was a large-scale military engagement fought between the forces of the Union of Soviet Socialist Republics and the Empire of Japan from August 12 to 16, 1945, as part of the Harbin–Kirin Operation of the Soviet invasion of Manchuria in World War II. The rapid conclusion of the Manchurian campaign meant that this was one of the only set-piece battles that took place before the end of hostilities. During the action, elements of the Japanese Fifth Army attempted to delay the Soviet Fifth Army and First Red Banner Army long enough to allow the bulk of the Japanese forces to retreat to more defensible positions. Though casualties on both sides were heavy, the Red Army forces were able to break through the hastily organized Japanese defenses and capture the city ten days ahead of schedule. Nevertheless, the Japanese defenders at Mutanchiang achieved their goal of allowing the main forces to escape.

== Background ==
In February 1945 at the Yalta Conference, the Soviet Union under Joseph Stalin agreed to enter the war against Japan within three months of Germany's defeat. To meet that deadline, the Soviet Union and the Western Allies co-operated in stockpiling supplies in the Far East, and the Red Army dispatched additional forces along the Trans-Siberian Railway. The Japanese monitored the buildup but did not believe the Soviets would be ready to attack until mid-September. The Japanese were thus being taken by surprise when the Soviet attack actually began on August 8.

The Japanese force tasked with defending Manchuria, the Kwantung Army, had been reduced from the Imperial Japanese Army's premier fighting force to a shell of its former self. Having been stripped of most heavy equipment and experienced formations, its forces had an average efficiency of under 30 percent relative to prewar units. The Soviets, on the other hand, hand-picked their best formations from the war in Europe based on their experience against certain types of terrain and enemy defenses. Key to the defense of eastern Manchuria was General Seiichi Kita's First Area Army, based at Mutanchiang. Subordinate to the Area Army were the Japanese Fifth and Third Armies; the Fifth Army, led by Lieutenant General Noritsune Shimuzu, would play the main part in the coming battle. The overall strategy in the event of a Soviet attack was for an initial stand to be made near the borders to allow the main Kwantung Army forces to withdraw to a "redoubt area" around the city of Tunghua. Unfortunately for the Japanese, the necessary redeployments and the fortifications at Tunghua were not ready at the opening of hostilities.

The Soviet strategy, on the other hand, was exactly the opposite. To prevent the Kwantung Army from withdrawing to relative safety, the Red Army leadership under Marshal A.M. Vasilevsky planned a lightning assault in the form of a pincer movement, which was designed to stun and envelop the Japanese before they had a chance to escape. In charge of operations opposite the First Area Army in Eastern Manchuria was Marshal Kirill Meretskov's First Far Eastern Front, whose objectives were to seize Jilin and cut off Manchuria from Korea. These orders would take Meretskov's forces through the vital centers of Mutanchiang and Harbin. Leading the drive to Mutanchiang would be Afanasy Beloborodov's 1st Red Banner Army and Nikolay Krylov's Fifth Army, fully half of their parent Front's combat strength.

The Soviets denounced the Soviet–Japanese Neutrality Pact with Japan on April 5. Soviet forces crossed the border into Japanese-held Manchuria at midnight on August 8, 1945 and achieved tactical surprise. In response, Imperial General Headquarters ordered all-out military action to begin against the Soviet Union. The Soviet–Japanese War had begun in earnest.

== Actions prior to August 12 ==
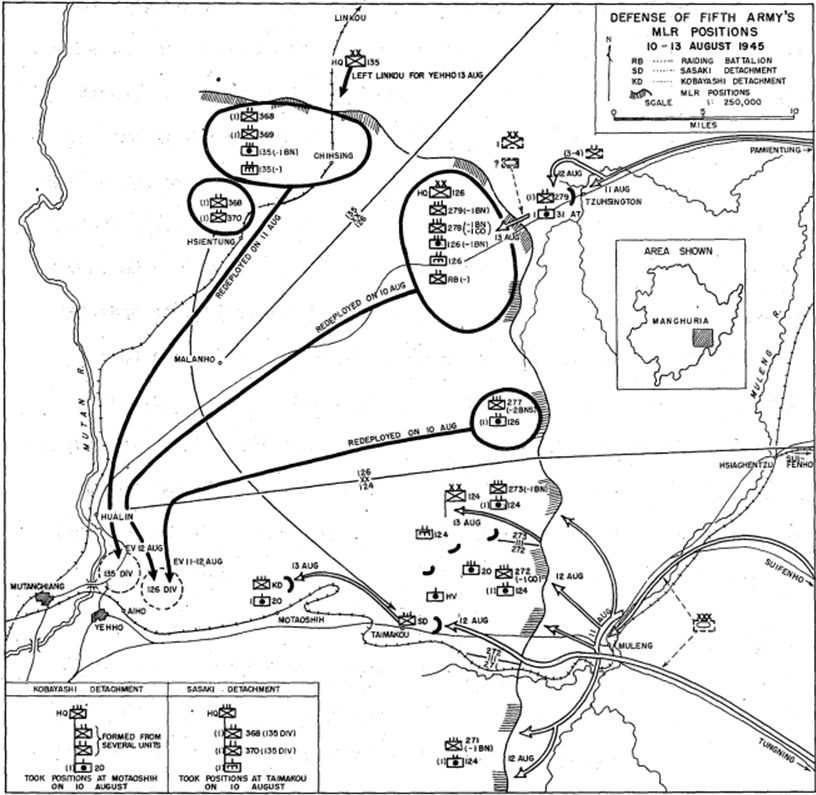
The first phase of the battle

The initial Red Army thrust was opposed by the 135th, 126th, and 124th infantry divisions of the Japanese 5th Army, which were driven back by the Soviet attack. The main land routes to Mutanchiang consisted of two mountain passes, one to the north and one to the east of the city. The Soviets would make use of both of them, with the 1st Red Banner Army attacking from the north and the 5th Army attacking from the east. The Soviets were ultimately successful in their advance, but losses, especially in tanks, were very heavy. Of particular concern were concealed anti-tank guns as well as suicide bombers with explosives strapped to their backs. These, together with the torrential rain, made advancing difficult.

== Battle begins ==
By August 12, the Japanese 5th Army had been compressed into a semicircle around Mutanchiang. The Soviets continued to gain ground, but the shrinking Japanese lines and their recovery from the initial attack meant that resistance in all sectors was stiffening. Despite showing an ability to recover and repair damaged tanks that both impressed and disheartened the Japanese, Soviet armored losses continued to mount: in one sharp action the 257th Tank Brigade's original strength of 65 tanks was reduced to 7. Japanese losses were also severe: on the morning of August 13, a convoy of troop trains was ambushed by Soviet tanks, which destroyed the trains and killed approximately 900 Japanese soldiers. Thirty cars were lost, carrying 24 artillery pieces, 30 vehicles, 800 rifles, and 100 machine guns. Among those who barely survived was the commander of the IJA 135th division.

Over the course of the next few days the Japanese continued resistance around Mutanchiang from a series of fortified hills, from which they could rain fire on the Soviet corridors. The Red Army was forced to take these hills one by one, using its preponderance in armor and artillery to neutralize the defenses. During the struggle for Mount Shozu, an important Japanese stronghold, the weight of Soviet fire was so great that it appeared as if the top of the mountain had been blown completely off. Suicide bombers and anti-tank guns remained an ever-present threat: on August 14 Japanese forces near Ssutaoling (Note: (possibly "Sidaoling"/四道岭 - "Sidao ridge" - near Sidao village/四道村 today)) knocked out 16 Soviet tanks with direct fire and a further 5 with suicide bombers; the latter vehicles being destroyed by only 5 men. Nevertheless, these attacks were reliant on the fanaticism of the individual Japanese soldier, and while they resulted in the destruction of Soviet armor, Japanese human losses were much higher.

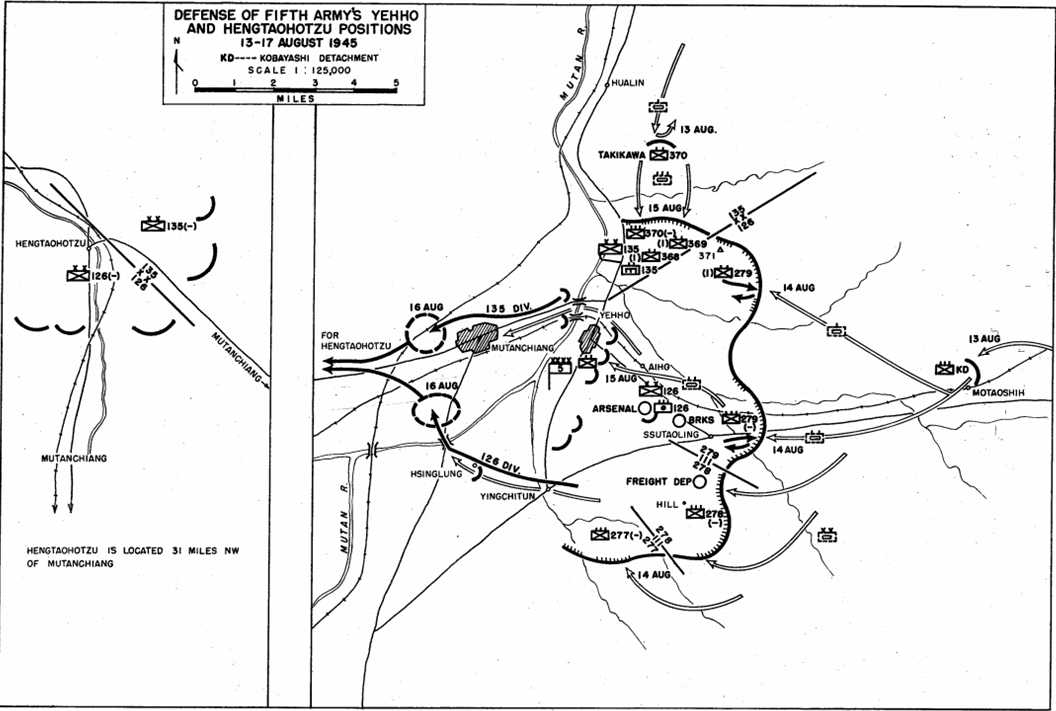
The final phase of the battle

The unexpectedly strong resistance around Mutanchiang caused Marshal Meretskov to change the 5th Army's objective from capturing the city to simply bypassing it and to leave the 1st Red Banner Army to take the city itself. That move threatened the integrity of the entire Japanese defense, and the situation became untenable. On August 15, General Shimizu, acting under the authorization of General Kita, ordered the IJA 5th Army to begin a withdraw and to leave only minor forces behind as a rearguard. At 0700 hours on August 16, the final Soviet assault on Mutanchiang began. Rocket artillery pulverized the remaining Japanese defenders, while tanks and infantry rushed forward to attack the city itself. However, in attempting to cross the Mudan River to the east of Mutanchiang, the 1st Red Banner Army found that all three bridges spanning it had been destroyed by the Japanese, and heavy fire from the opposite bank made a landing by boat impossible.

In response, the Soviet 22nd Rifle Division crossed the river farther to the north and surprised the Japanese defenders from behind, which forced their withdrawal. That allowed the bulk of the 1st Red Banner Army to cross directly over the river and to begin the assault on the central area. By 1100, Soviet forces began the room-by-room conquest of Mutanchiang in the face of fanatical resistance. By 1300, the Japanese rearguard had abandoned the city under pressure from the south, the east, and the northwest. Only scattered groups of diehards were left to continue resistance from the devastated buildings. As the 1st Red Banner Army invested Mutanchiang, the Soviet 5th Army to the south continued its advance westward, enveloping and destroying the Japanese 278th Infantry Regiment, the survivors of which chose to mount a last-ditch banzai charge rather than surrender. By the end of the day, all of Mutanchiang had fallen into Soviet hands, and the battle for the city was over. Shortly afterward, the main strength of the Kwantung Army laid down its arms in obedience to Emperor Hirohito's surrender broadcast. The Battle of Mutanchiang, and World War II, had come to an end.

== Results ==
Through the speed and the audacious conduct of their offensive, the Soviet 5th and 1st Red Banner Armies won a major victory at Mutanchiang, advanced 150-180 km, and captured the objective fully ten days ahead of schedule. The rapid advance pre-empted Japanese plans to establish a strong initial defensive line before Mutanchiang and forced the Japanese to begin their withdrawal early, which fragmented their forces. Despite those successes, however, stiff Japanese resistance and the failure of the main Soviet forces to keep pace with their spearheads allowed the bulk of the IJA 5th Army to withdraw, albeit at only 50% of its already-substandard effectiveness. Soviet leaders acknowledged this, admitting the retreating Japanese were still "a very considerable force." However, all of that would matter little, as the war ended before any further major fighting could take place.

Casualties on both sides were heavy. The Japanese reported 25,000 overall casualties, including 9,391 killed, from both the 5th Army and other units subordinate to the 1st Area Army that took part in the fighting. They also admitted the loss of 104 artillery pieces. In exchange, they claimed to have inflicted 7,000-10,000 Soviet casualties and to have destroyed 300-600 tanks. Those claims may actually have been an underestimate: Soviet calculations place the 1st Far Eastern Front's losses in the Manchurian campaign as 21,069, including 6,324 killed, captured, or missing and 14,745 wounded and sick. At least half of them were incurred during the fighting at Mutanchiang.

== Bibliography ==
- Glantz, David (February 1983). August Storm: Soviet 1945 Strategic Offensive in Manchuria. Fort Leavenworth: Combat Studies Institute, US Army Command and General Staff College.
- Glantz, David (2004). Soviet Operational and Tactical Combat in Manchuria, 1945: 'August Storm'. Routledge. ISBN 978-1-13-577477-6.
- Glantz, David (June 1983). August Storm: Soviet Tactical and Operational Combat in Manchuria, 1945. Fort Leavenworth: Combat Studies Institute, US Army Command and General Staff College.
- "Japanese Monograph no. 154: Record of Operations against Soviet Russia, Eastern Front" (PDF). August 1945. Archived (PDF) from the original on 2019-01-02.
- Shtemenko, Sergei (1970). The Soviet General Staff at War, 1941-1945. Moscow: Progress Publishers.
- Toland, John (2003). The Rising Sun: The Decline and Fall of the Japanese Empire 1936-1945. Modern Library. ISBN 978-0-81-296858-3.
