= Pavel Abankin =

Soviet naval officer

Pavel Sergeyevich Abankin
- Born: 18 September [O.S. 5 September] 1902; Pochkovo, Yelatomsky Uyezd, Tambov Governorate, Russian Empire
- Died: 15 August 1965 (aged 62) Leningrad, Soviet Union
- Buried: Serafimovskoe Cemetery
- Allegiance: Soviet Union
- Branch: Soviet Navy
- Service years: 1923-1960
- Rank: Admiral
- Commands: Amur Flotilla; Onega Flotilla; Voroshilov Naval Academy; Hydrographic Service
- Conflicts: Second World War
- Awards: Order of Lenin (twice); Order of the Red Banner (twice); Order of Ushakov First Class

Pavel Sergeyevich Abankin (Russian: Павел Сергеевич Абанькин; 18 September [O.S. 5 September] 1902 – 15 August 1965) was an officer of the Soviet Navy. He served during the Second World War and reached the rank of admiral.

Born in 1902, Abankin was initially employed in merchant shipping, with a brief stint during the Russian Civil War with the Azov Flotilla. He studied at a navigation school, served on merchant vessels and in ports, and visited Siberia. He was also involved in political work, before entering the navy in 1923 with studies at the Frunze Naval School. After some sea-going service, he became involved in naval aviation, combining training as a flight navigator with the posts of chief of staff of different naval air units in the Baltic. He studied at the Naval Academy's command faculty, graduating in 1937 and being appointed military commissar of the Stalin Naval Aviation School in Yeisk. He was soon sent to the Pacific Fleet to serve on its military council, and then that of the Amur Flotilla, before taking command of the flotilla in 1941. He was in this role when the Axis invasion of the Soviet Union began, and took care to ensure the flotilla was prepared against potential Japanese offensive moves.

In 1943, Abankin became commander of the Onega Flotilla, which was heavily engaged in actions on the Karelian Front. The flotilla withdrew from active operations with the onset of winter in 1943, and Abankin stepped down in 1944. He was briefly reappointed commander of the Amur Flotilla in March that year, but several months later became head of the Voroshilov Naval Academy. He then served in various deputy roles in the naval command, and took part in the trial of the four admirals between 1947 and 1948. His final roles were as head of the navy's Hydrographic Service, and then as a military consultant in the Group of Inspectors General, before retiring in 1960. He died in 1965, at the age of 62, having received a number of honours and awards.

== Career ==
=== Early years and education ===
Abankin was born on 18 September [O.S. 5 September] 1902 in the village of Pochkovo, in what was then Yelatomsky Uyezd, Tambov Governorate, in the Russian Empire.^{[a]} He enrolled at a navigation school in September 1918, graduating in April 1919. The Russian Civil War was then being fought and he joined the Bolsheviks, being assigned to the Azov Flotilla as a machinist aboard an auxiliary vessel. After the war he worked in the Port of Rostov-on-Don from 1920, studied at the Polytechnic Institute of Water Transport, and then took part in the Yamal Polar Expedition from May 1922. He was initially employed as a motorman, but ended the expedition as its deputy commissar. With the winding up of the expedition, Abankin was appointed to manage a cooperative in Novosibirsk by the Siberian Bureau of the Communist Party. He was not long employed here before returning to the Sea of Azov as assistant master of a dredger of the Azov Shipping Company, and then worked in the Central Committee of the Communist Party's South-Eastern Bureau.

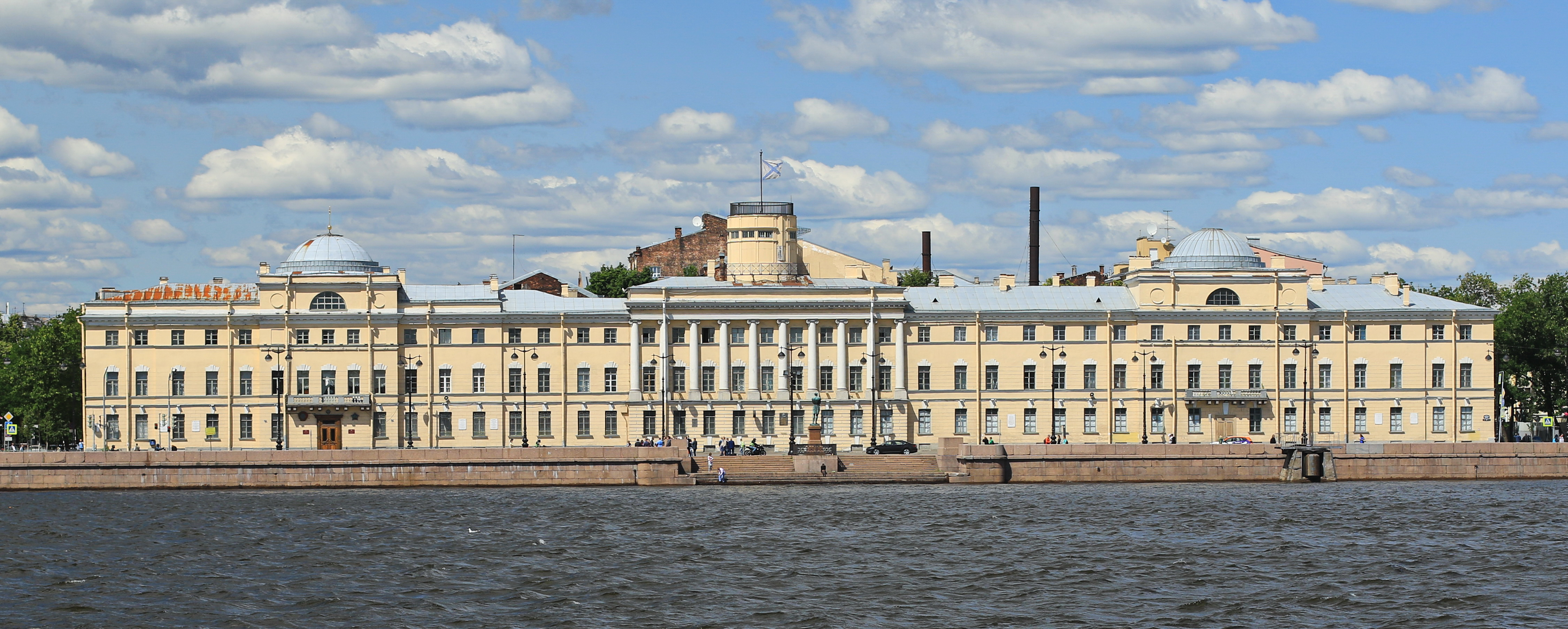
The building of the Frunze Naval School, where Abankin studied between 1923 and 1927.

By now having spent most of his early years in the merchant fleet, in October 1923 Abankin enrolled in the Frunze Naval School, graduating in October 1927. He initially worked as a trainee platoon commander of the Machine School until January 1928, and then went to sea as an assistant watch commander of the Baltic Fleet battleship Oktyabrskaya Revolyutsiya. He came ashore by October 1928, when he moved into Soviet Naval Aviation and took the air combat courses at the Third School of Pilots and Flight Navigators in Oranienbaum, completing them in May 1929. He was concurrently acting Chief of Staff of the 51st Separate Air Detachment from March 1928, and on completing the course, was commissioned as a senior flight navigator and confirmed in post as chief of staff. In December 1930 he was appointed chief of staff of the 62nd Aviation Squadron of the 4th Air Brigade, and then moved in December 1932 to be chief of staff of an aviation squadron of the Baltic Fleet's 2nd Air Brigade.

=== Further studies and Second World War ===
Abankin enrolled in the Naval Academy's command faculty in December 1933, graduating in May 1937 and being appointed military commissar of the Stalin Naval Aviation School in Yeisk. He began the Military-Political Courses in Moscow in June 1939, but left before completing them, and was that month instead appointed to the Pacific Fleet's military council, with the rank of brigade-commissar from 13 June. From there he moved to the Amur Flotilla's military council in April 1940, and on 22 July that year was appointed commander of the flotilla, being advanced to captain 1st rank on the same day. He was promoted to rear-admiral on 21 May 1941, and was serving in this role when the Axis invasion of the Soviet Union began in June 1941. Within three days of the invasion, a battalion of volunteers was formed from the sailors of the flotilla, and was dispatched to the front on 22 October as part of the 84th Marine Rifle Brigade, seeing action at the Battle of Moscow. Abankin then oversaw the strengthening of the defences along the Amur, Argun, and Ussuri rivers, Lake Khanka, and the flotilla's bases at Khabarovsk and elsewhere, against potential Japanese offensive moves.

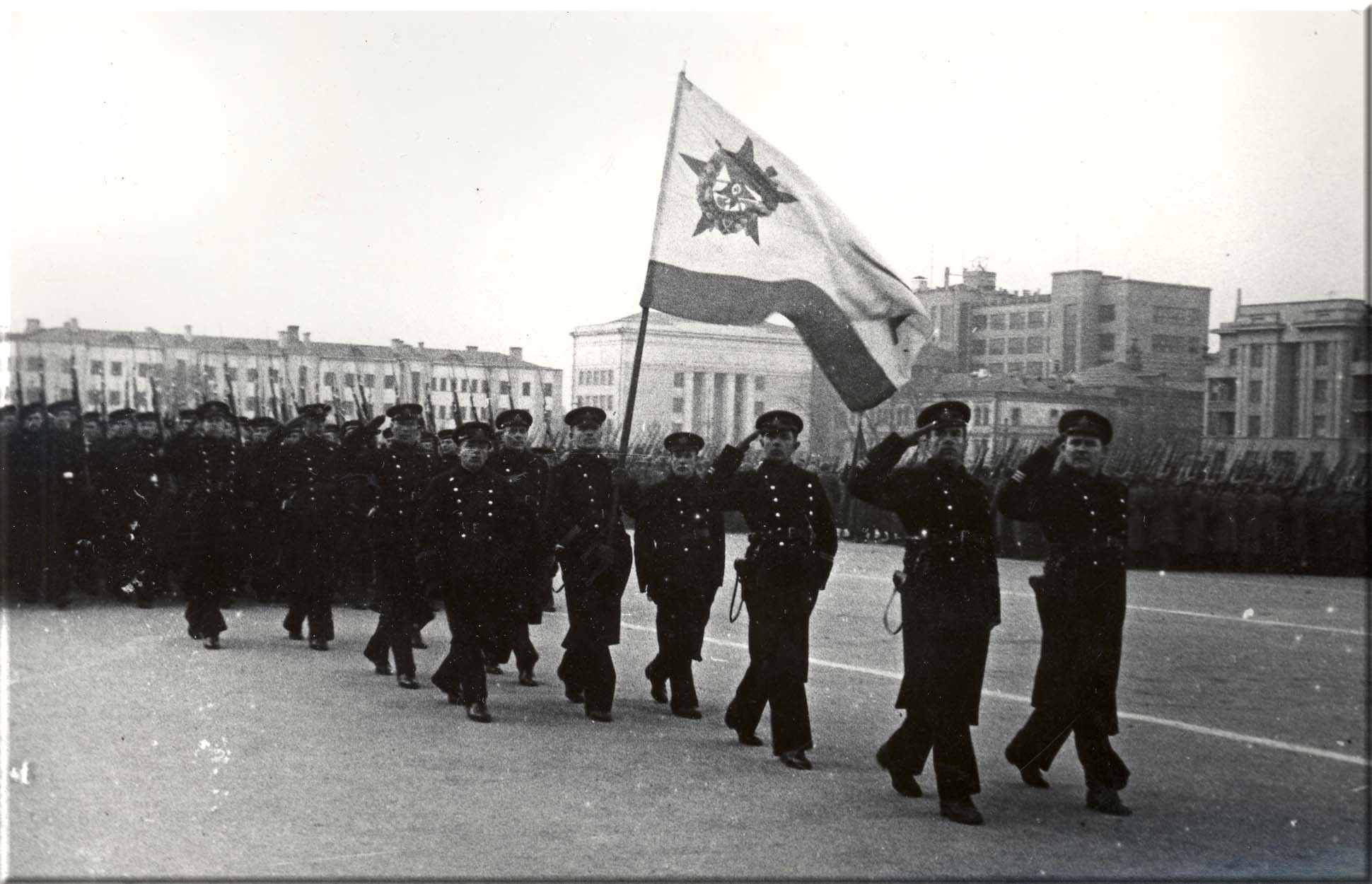
Sailors of the Amur Flotilla marching in 1941, during Abankin's time in command.

Abankin stepped down as flotilla commander on 29 June 1943, and was temporarily without a post until 11 August 1943, when he was appointed commander of the Onega Flotilla. The flotilla was heavily engaged in actions on the Karelian Front, supporting the 7th and 32nd Armies. As well as transporting equipment and supplies, and providing anti-air coverage, the flotilla's vessels directly engaged enemy ground forces with rocket fire, and on 22 August 1943, provided fire support for offensive operations near Vazheroksa. Abankin was present with gunboats of the flotilla, which had secretly entered the Onega Canal, while the operation was led by his chief of staff Neon Antonov. The operation was a success, and Soviet use of the lake increased from then on, with the flotilla carrying out repeated attacks on enemy positions and lines of communication, and the escorting of 240 convoys, consisting of more than 800 ships. Abankin was praised for his work with the flotilla by People's Commissar of the Navy Nikolai Kuznetsov, who wrote "[He] was not in the flotilla for long, but he left a noticeable mark on the organization of combat and everyday service, in the methodological and tactical training of unit and ship commanders, strengthening the foundations of the flotilla's further successes." The flotilla withdrew from active operations with the onset of winter in 1943, and Abankin stepped down as commander on 25 January 1944.

Briefly without a post from January 1944, Abankin was reappointed to command the Amur Flotilla in March that year. He was promoted to vice-admiral on 21 July 1944. His work was again to conduct training and defensive preparations in case of any Japanese offensive. In September 1944, he was appointed to head of the Voroshilov Naval Academy, and concurrently editor-in-chief of the naval journal Morskoy Sbornik. He remained in these roles until almost the end of the war, being appointed Deputy People's Commissar of the Navy in April 1945, and then Deputy Commander-in-Chief of the Navy for Personnel in March 1946.

=== Postwar ===
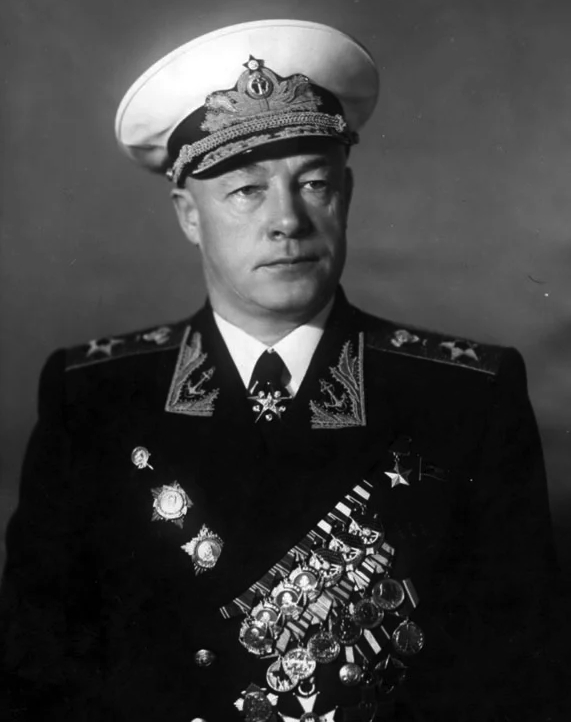
Nikolai Kuznetsov. Despite praising Abankin during the war, Kuznetsov and three other admirals were found guilty by fellow naval officers, including Abankin, on politically motivated charges.

Abankin was deputy commander of the navy for personnel until February 1947, when he became deputy commander of the navy for shipbuilding. In December 1947, he was appointed to a Court of Honour investigating several high-ranking admirals, Nikolai Kuznetsov, Lev Galler, Vladimir Alafuzov and Georgy Stepanov. The four faced accusations from Captain 1st Rank Vladimir Alfyorov of having passed military secrets to the Allies during the war. The charges were politically motivated, being used by Josef Stalin as an excuse to demote Kuznetsov from a position of independence, and under pressure, the investigating officers supported the accusations. The four admirals were brought to trial, with Abankin and his fellow appointees either willing, or under pressure, to return guilty verdicts based on false accusations and attestations. The four were found guilty in February 1948, and were subjected to demotions and imprisonment.

Abankin then served as Deputy Minister of the Navy for shipbuilding and armament from March 1950, holding this post until April 1952, when he was appointed head of the navy's Hydrographic Directorate, renamed the Hydrographic Service in 1953. He had been promoted to admiral on 27 January 1951. He stepped down in June 1958, and was appointed as a military consultant in the Group of Inspectors General, before retiring from the military in September 1960. He settled in Leningrad and died there on 14 August 1965, at the age of 62. He was buried in the city's Serafimovskoe Cemetery.

== Honours and awards ==
Over his career Abankin received two Orders of Lenin, in 1943 and 1944, two Orders of the Red Banner, in 1944 and 1953, the Order of Ushakov first class in 1945, the Socialist Federal Republic of Yugoslavia's Order of Brotherhood and Unity first class, and various medals.

== Notes ==
a. Now Ogaryovo-Pochkovo in Sasovsky District, Ryazan Oblast.
