= Siege of Hutou Fortress =

1945 Soviet-Japanese battle in Manchuria

- Part of the Soviet invasion of Manchuria of World War II
Date	9–28 August 1945 (2 weeks, 5 days)
Location	Jixi, Manchuria
Result	Soviet victory

Belligerents
Soviet Union	(Empire of Japan) Japan

Commanders and leaders
(Soviet Union) Nikanor Zakhvatayev	(Empire of Japan) Tadashi Oki †

Units involved
1st Far Eastern Front: 35th Army	First Area Army: Fifth Army

Strength
About 20,000	About 1,400

Casualties and losses
3,462 casualties	1,347 casualties

In the closing stages of the Soviet–Japanese War during August 1945, the Japanese Kwantung Army maintained strong resistance at the Hutou Fortress. Despite fierce and suicidal Japanese resistance, the Red Army, with the support of local Chinese fighters, captured the fortress on August 26, 1945. This marked the end of one of the final campaigns of the Second World War.

Following the battle, Japan’s unconditional surrender occurred just 11 days later. Of the approximately 1,400 Japanese soldiers stationed at the fortress, only 53 survived. The significance of this battle was recognized in a 2009 study by the Social Science Academy of Heilongjiang Province, titled “The Final Battle of World War II”.

== Background ==
At the beginning of the 20th century, Japan regarded the Soviet Union as its greatest potential adversary. In 1931, after the Japanese Kwantung Army invaded northeast China, it directly confronted the Soviet Army along the Sino-Soviet border. To strengthen preparations for war against the Soviet Union, the Kwantung Army began constructing fortifications. Starting in 1934, the Japanese built 17 fortresses, comprising more than 80,000 permanent structures, along a 5,000-kilometre stretch of the border. This defensive line ran from Hunchun in Jilin Province in the east, through Heilongjiang Province in the centre, and extended to Hailar and Arshan in Inner Mongolia in the west.

To defend against the Soviet Far East Front, the Japanese concentrated their fortifications in the East Manchuria region, which accounted for more than half of the total number of fortresses. The largest and most well-known of these was the Hutou Fortress.

Hutou Fortress, located in Hulin County, Heilongjiang Province, near Hutou Town, is positioned among the hills of the Wunda Mountains, with the Firestone Mountains to the west and the Ussuri River to the east. The fortress spans 12 kilometers at the front and extends 6 kilometers deep at the back. It consists of five key positions: Mangtu Mountain, Tiger North Mountain, Tiger East Mountain, Tiger West Mountain, and Tiger Tsunami Mountain. These positions were interconnected by pits and communication trenches. Due to its large scale, complex structure, and comprehensive facilities, the Kwantung Army boasted that it was the 'Oriental Maginot Line'.

Between 1934 and 1939, the Kwantung Army invested hundreds of millions of dollars in constructing the Hutou Fortress, employing hundreds of thousands of Chinese laborers and prisoners of war. These workers were transported to the fortress under harsh conditions, often described as "hell on earth." They were poorly clothed, underfed, and forced to work more than ten hours a day in physically demanding tasks. Countless workers died from exhaustion, illness, or were killed outright.

In March 1939, the Kwantung Army established the 4th Border Guard Brigade and stationed it at Hutou Fortress. By 1941, the fortress reached its peak strength, with the garrison numbering around 12,000 soldiers, and the fortifications were heavily armed. However, after the outbreak of the Pacific War, the Japanese military shifted its strategic focus to the southern theater, drawing resources away from the Kwantung Army. As a result, the strength of the Kwantung Army in the region declined sharply, leading to a significant shortage of troops and equipment. By the time the Soviet Army launched its attack on Hutou Fortress, the Japanese garrison, the 15th Border Guard Brigade, had been reduced to only around 1,400 soldiers, with limited equipment and ammunition.

== Battle ==
With the declaration of war on Japan by the Soviet Union on 8 August 1945 and the start of the invasion in the early hours of 9 August, fighting broke out between the 15th Border Garrison at Tiger Head Fortress and the invading Soviet troops. As the garrison commander, Army Colonel Takeshi Nishiwaki, was on a business trip to the 5th Army Headquarters and could not return to his unit, the artillery commander, Army Captain Tadashi Ohki, took command as acting garrison commander. A large number of civilian Japanese residents from the surrounding area were also evacuated to the fortress, resulting in a total of approximately 1800 people being caged in. According to one theory, 1,400 civilians were evacuated, thus bringing the total number of civilians to nearly 3,000. However, many of the civilians were women and girls due to the 'uprooting mobilisation'. The Type 90 train artillery was dismantled for transportation to Tonga and could not be bombarded, but the 41 cm howitzers shelled the railway bridge on the Siberian Railway's Iman diversions line and continued shelling the Soviet troops until the gun's barrel was disabled on the 19th due to a cavity in the gun barrel.

The Soviet Army, with about 20,000 men in two divisions, set about capturing the fortress. The surrounding Kwantung Army was in retreat and the garrison was isolated and desperate, but it is not clear to what extent the garrison itself understood this. On 15 August, the garrison heard the announcement of the Gyokuon-broadcast, but regarded it as a conspiracy; on 17 August, five Japanese prisoners of war, as military envoys of the Soviet Army, informed the Japanese Government of their unconditional surrender and negotiated a ceasefire to disarm them, but the Soviets refused as a conspiracy; one of the garrison officers beheaded the local branch chairman of the Zainogun-kai, who was also a military envoy; on 18 August, a Japanese officer was killed by the Soviet Army, who had been a member of the Soviet Army. The Soviets then proceeded to negotiate a ceasefire, but this was rejected as a plot. The Soviet army did not send any more military envoys after that and is believed to have adopted a policy of thorough annihilation unless the Japanese surrendered.

Soviet troops also attacked underground facilities by pouring petrol into them, igniting it and sending the smoke through a blower to kill Japanese soldiers through carbon monoxide poisoning. On 26 August, the Hutou Fortress fell completely. Only 53 survivors are reported to have survived. The Japanese had boldly stated that Hutou Fortress would be able to fight for more than half a year, but it could only hold out for more than half a month due to insufficient forces. The Battle of Tiger Head Fortress, which was a fierce battle because of this, is said to be the last fierce battle of the Second World War on the Japanese side (on the Soviet side, many people think of the end of the Second World War as the end of the German-Soviet War, and the Soviet-Japanese war started afterwards and the battle itself ended after less than a month, so there is a general lack of interest.)

== See also ==
- End of World War II in Asia
