= Sungari Offensive Operation =

1945 Red Army operation

- Part of the Soviet invasion of Manchuria of World War II
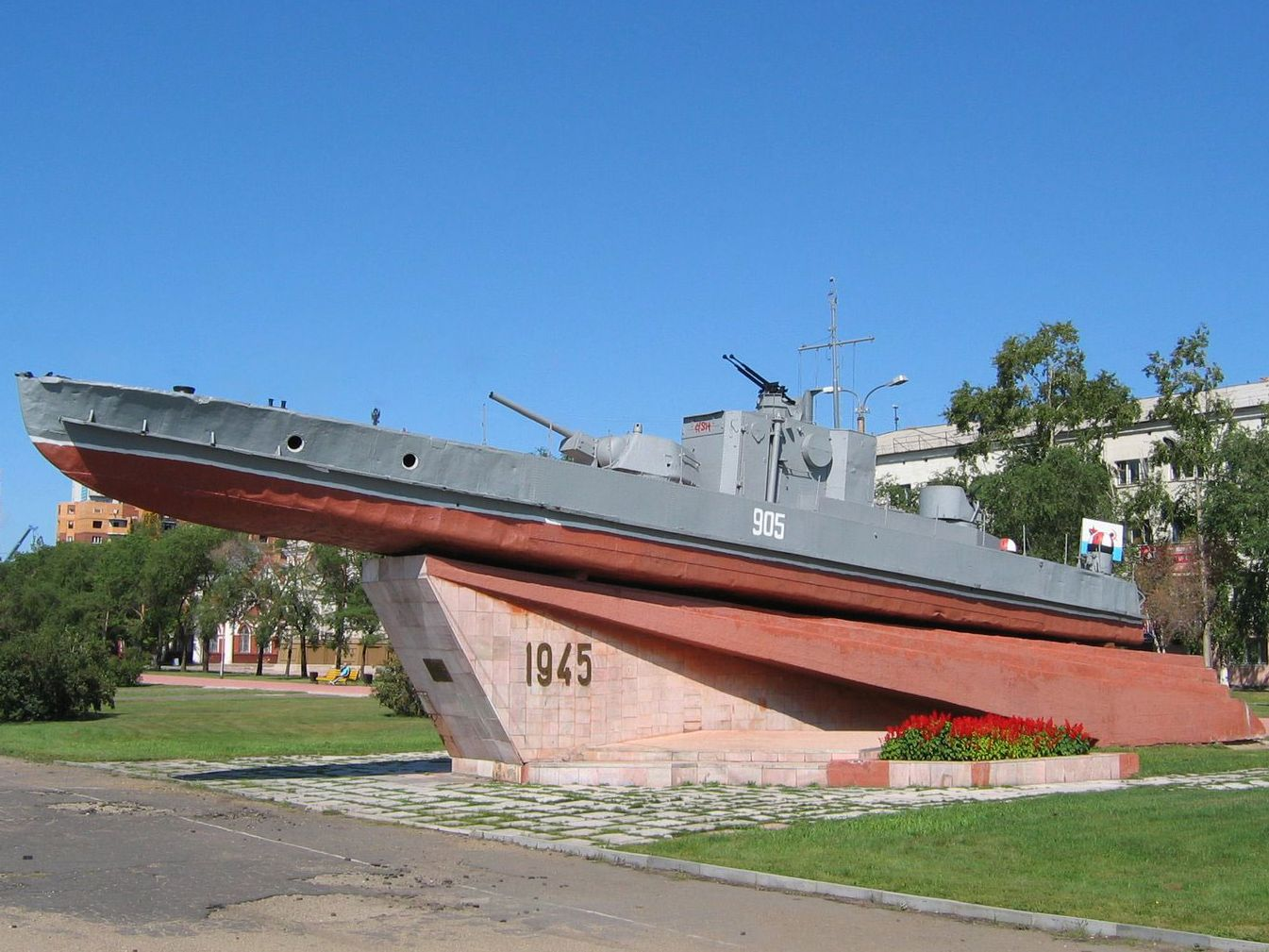
- A Type 1125BKA armoured motor gunboat that took part in the Sungari Operation, mounted as part of a monument in Blagoveshchensk, Russia; photographed on 24 August 2008
| Date | 9 August – 2 September 1945 |
| Location | Manchuria |
| Result | Soviet victory |

Belligerents
| Soviet Union | Japan; Manchukuo |

Commanders and leaders
| Maksim Purkayev; Neon Antonov | Mikio Uemura; Jin Izeki; Otozō Yamada |

Units involved
| 2nd Far Eastern Front; 2nd Red Banner Army; 15th Army; 16th Army; 5th Separate Rifle Corps; 10th Air Army; Amur Air Defense Army; Amur Military Flotilla | Kwantung Army; First Area Army; Fourth Army; Songhua River Flotilla |

Strength
| 333,000 men 5,988 guns and mortars 72 rocket launchers 917 tanks and self-propelled guns 1,260 aircraft | Unknown |

Casualties and losses
| Unknown | 1,578 killed 266,000 captured |

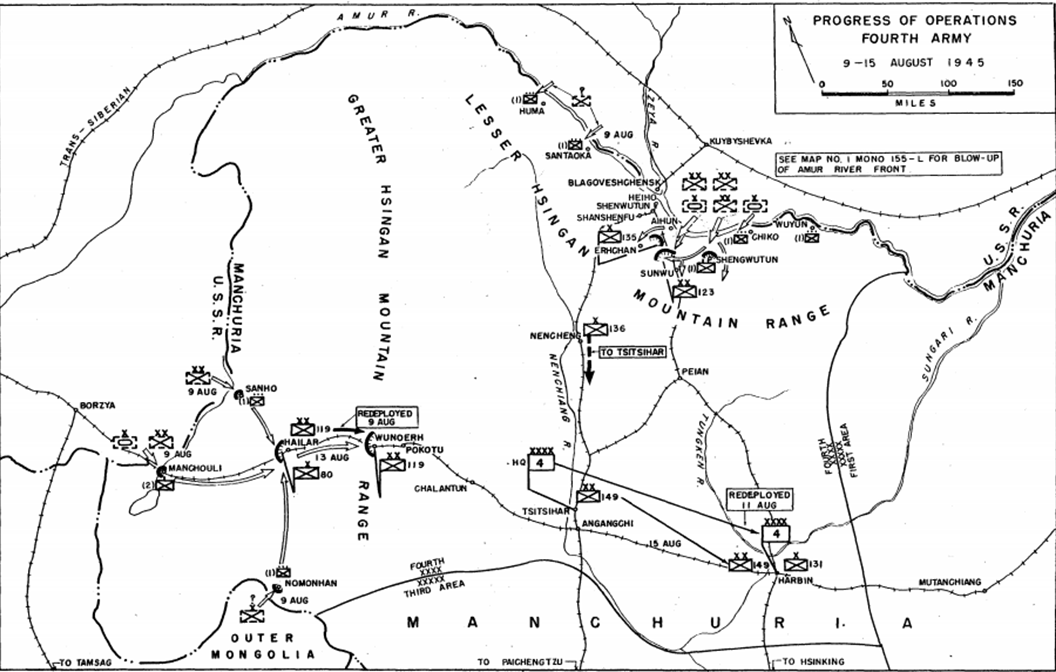
Japanese military map of the operations of the Japanese Fourth Army in Manchuria in August 1945

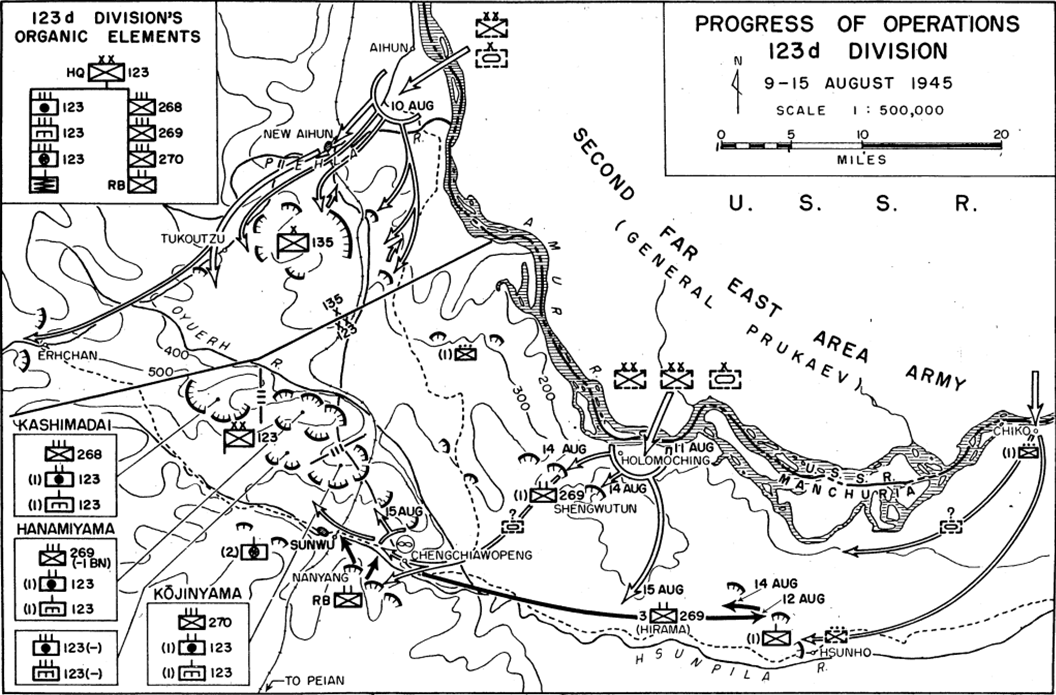
Japanese military map of the Japanese 4th Army's operations against the Soviet 2nd Far Eastern Front on the Amur River in August 1945

The Sungari Offensive Operation was a military campaign conducted by the Red Army against Japanese forces during the Soviet–Japanese War. It took place from 9 August to 2 September 1945 and was carried out by troops of the 2nd Far Eastern Front and the Amur Military Flotilla. The operation formed part of the broader Manchurian Strategic Offensive Operation and had a primary objective of assisting the troops of the Transbaikal Front and 1st Far Eastern Front in defeating the Japanese Kwantung Army. The operation succeeded in capturing the northern and northeastern parts of Manchuria from the Japanese.

== Forces ==
=== Soviet Union ===
The Sungari Offensive Operation was conducted by the Soviet Red Army's 2nd Far Eastern Front, under the command of Army General Maksim Purkayev, in cooperation with the Amur Military Flotilla, under the command of Kontr-admiral (Counter Admiral) Neon Antonov. At the beginning of the operation, the 2nd Far Eastern Front included the 2nd Red Banner Army, 15th Army, 16th Army, 5th Separate Rifle Corps, 10th Air Army and Amur Air Defense Army, a total of 333,000 men, 5,988 guns and mortars, 72 rocket launchers, 917 tanks and self-propelled guns, and 1,260 aircraft. The Amur Military Flotilla numbered 12,500 men, 126 ships, about 200 guns and mortars, and 68 aircraft.

=== Japan ===
Japanese forces of the Imperial Japanese Army's Kwantung Army opposed the Soviet operation. Along the Songhua and Zhaohai fronts these included units of the First Area Army and the Manchukuo Songhua River Flotilla, while on the Qiqihar front units of the Fourth Army faced the Soviets. Along a 2,130-kilometre (1,324-mile) front line along the northern and eastern borders of Manchuria, the Imperial Japanese Army had the Sakhalyan, Songhua, Xingshanzhen, Fujin, and Zhaohai fortified regions.

== The operation ==
The Red Army planned to launch its main attack along the Songhua River (also known as the Sungari River) toward Harbin with the 15th Army in cooperation with two brigades of the Amur Military Flotilla. The 5th Separate Rifle Corps, in cooperation with the Bikin Flotilla Brigade, had orders to conduct supporting attacks on Zhaohe and Baoqing, while the 2nd Red Banner Army, the Zeya-Bureya Brigade, and a separate flotilla division launched another supporting attack from the Blagoveshchensk area toward Qiqihar. The Red Army command thus planned to dismember the Japanese Kwantung Army and destroy it piecemeal. The 16th Army, Northern Pacific Military Flotilla, Kamchatka Defensive Region, and Petropavlovsk Naval Base were to defend the western coast of the Tatar Strait, northern Sakhalin Island, and the Kamchatka Peninsula while preparing their own offensive into Japan's Karafuto Prefecture in southern Sakhalin Island and amphibious landings in the Kuril Islands.

On 9 August 1945, the 15th Army and 5th Separate Rifle Corps launched their offensive. On 10 August, the 2nd Red Banner Army began its offensive operation. They crossed the Amur River and Ussuri River with the assistance of the Amur Military Flotilla, which landed Soviet troops on the Japanese-held banks of the rivers – notably a landing at Fuyuan. The offensive succeeded, and within three days Soviet troops had cleared the entire right bank of the Amur River of Japanese forces. Between 10 and 13 August, Soviet forces broke through the Fujin, Zhaohei, and Sakhalyan fortified regions, after which they began advancing deep into Manchuria. The 15th Army advanced along both banks of the Songhua River, but lost momentum as it crossed into virtually roadless mountainous, taiga, and swampy terrain. The Soviets then committed ships of the Amur Military Flotilla to the offensive: They transported army detachments to reinforce the advanced forces, conducted amphibious landings, and provided gunfire support to forces ashore. Despite a confident advance by Soviet troops, fierce fighting continued in some areas.

On 14 August, the 15th Army captured the Xingshanzhen fortified region, and on 17 August it captured Jiamusi with the support of the Amur Military Flotilla. Meanwhile, the 5th Separate Rifle Corps captured Baoqing and then began an advance toward Boli, supporting the 15th Army's offensive from the south. From 15 to 18 August, units of the 2nd Red Banner Army captured the Sunwu fortified region and the city of Sunwu itself, where they took a Japanese garrison of 20,000 soldiers prisoner. On 19 August, the Amur Military Flotilla and the 632nd Rifle Regiment captured Yilan. By 20 August, troops of the 2nd Red Banner Army had crossed the Lesser Khingan mountain range, continuing to develop the Soviet offensive toward Qiqihar, and on 20 August the 15th Army entered Harbin, which Soviet airborne forces and a naval flotilla already had captured. Thus, by 20 August, the offensive largely had achieved its objectives, and Soviet troops spent the remainder of the operation suppressing isolated pockets of resistance.

== Results ==
During the Sangari Offenisive Operation, Soviet forces defeated the Japanese First Area Army and 4th Separate Army and captured approximately 266,000 prisoners, 286 guns, 86 tanks, and a large quantity of other military equipment and ammunition. The offensive captured northern and northeastern Manchuria from the Japanese and made a significant contribution to the Soviet victory in the Soviet-Japanese War, hastening the end of World War II.
