= Vozzhayevka air base =

Airport in Amur Oblast, Russia

Vozzhayevka
- Vozzhayevka, Amur Oblast in Russia
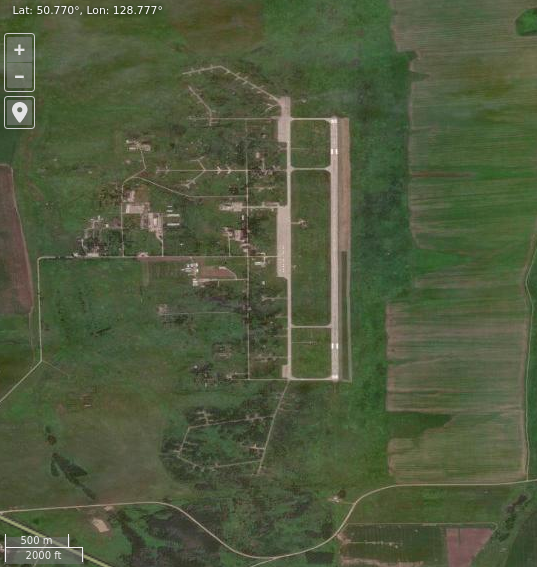
- Satellite imagery of Vozzhayevka air base

Site information
- Type: Air Base
- Owner: Ministry of Defence
- Operator: Russian Air Force

Location
- Shown within Amur Oblast Vozzhayevka (Russia)
- Coordinates: 50°46′12″N 128°46′36″E

Site history
- Built: 1948
- In use: 1948 - present

Airfield information
- Identifiers: ICAO: UHWV
- Elevation: 225 metres (738 ft) AMSL
Runways
Direction	Length and surface
01/19	2,500 metres (8,202 ft) Concrete

Vozzhayevka (also Vozzhayevka Northeast (US)) is an air base in Amur Oblast, Russia located about 100 km southeast of Blagoveshchensk. It is a medium-sized air base located near an SS-11 missile field at Svobodnyy. During the 1980s it was one of 17 airfields hosting the Soviet Union's tactical reconnaissance aircraft regiments.

Units stationed at Vozzhayevka included the 293rd Independent Reconnaissance Aviation Regiment (293 ORAP) and the 56th Aviation Regiment of Fighter-Bombers (56 APIB) flying Sukhoi Su-17M3R (ASCC: Fitter) aircraft in the late 1980s and the Mikoyan-Gurevich MiG-25 (NATO: Foxbat) until 1987. The regiment was part of the 1st Air Army in the Far East Military District.

== History ==
A declassified 1950s-era hand sketch of Vozzhayevka, created by CIA intelligence operatives working in the area.

In July 1948 the 10th Air Army was transferred from Sakhalin Island to Vozzhayevka. One of the first U-2 flights over the region in 1958 revealed five Tupolev Tu-4 (ASCC: Bull) bombers.

In the late 1960s, a runway extension and 30 new hardstands were added, and Mikoyan-Gurevich MiG-17 (ASCC: Fresco) and Yakovlev Yak-25 (NATO: Mandrake) were being operated at the airfield. An October 1972 reconnaissance satellite analysis showed six MiG-17, three Yakovlev Yak-28 (NATO: Brewer), three Mikoyan-Gurevich MiG-15UTI (NATO: Fagot) trainers, with small numbers of older fighters and transports.

By 1980, the airfield was operating Sukhoi Su-24 (NATO: Fencer-A) aircraft. By 1984 the Soviet Union had begun deploying advanced MiG-25R aircraft to the airfield, and a normal complement at the airfield then consisted of 5 to 16 MiG-25R and 7 to 11 MiG-21R reconnaissance aircraft.

An Ilyushin Il-76MD (NATO: Candid) destined for Vozzhayevka crash-landed at Astrakhan on June 20, 2000.

Satellite imagery from 2010 onward showed the base abandoned, with the remains of several Su-24 Fencer aircraft strewn about the storage areas.

As of 2024 satellite imagery indicates that the air base is in usable condition.

== See also ==
- List of military airbases in Russia
