= Amur Flotilla =

Military unit

Amur Military Flotilla
- Амурская военная флотилия
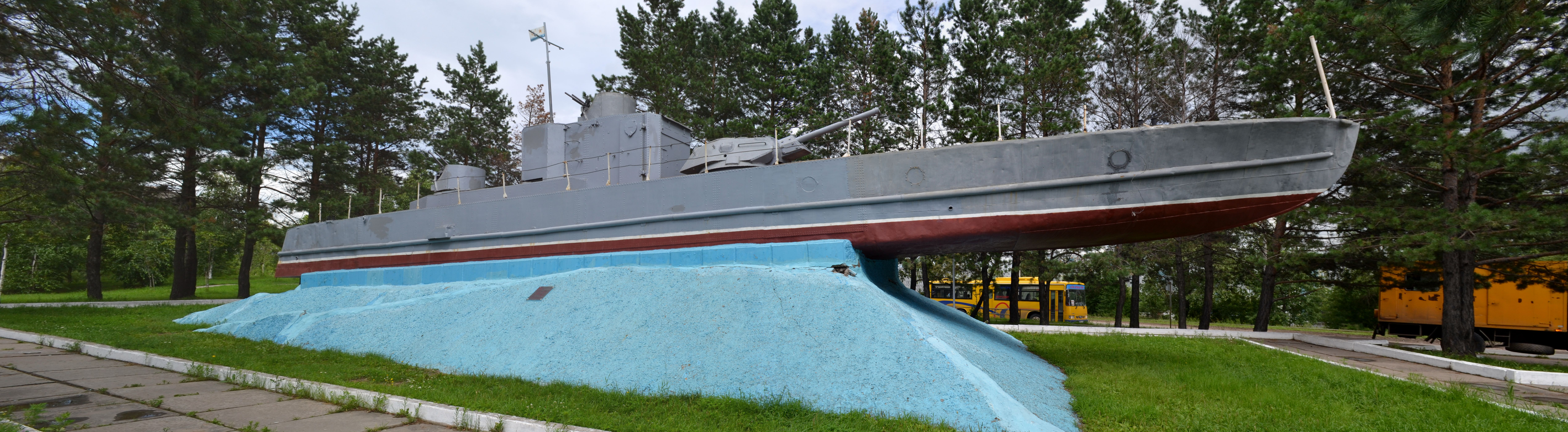
- A World War II–era Type 1125BKA armoured motor gunboat of the Amur Military Flotilla, a memorial ship in Khabarovsk, 2014
- Active: 1905–1998
- Country: Russian Empire (1905–1917); Russian Republic (1917); Soviet Russia (1917–1918); Japan (1918–1920); Far Eastern Republic (1920–1922); Russian SFSR (1922); Soviet Union (1922–1991); Russian Federation (1991–1998)
- Branch: Imperial Russian Navy (1905–1917); Russian Navy (1917–1918); Red Fleet (1918); Japanese expeditionary force in Siberia (1918–1920); Far Eastern Republic Naval Force (1920–1922); Red Fleet (1922–1923); Soviet Navy (1923–1992); Russian Navy (1992–1995); Russian Maritime Border Guard (1995–1998)
- Type: Riverine naval detachment (until 1908); Riverine naval flotilla (1905–1955); Naval base (1955–1995); Coast guard flotilla (since 1995)
- Engagements: Russo-Japanese War; Russian Civil War; Siberian intervention; Sino-Soviet conflict (1929); Battle of Lahasusu; Kanchazu Island incident; Soviet–Japanese War; Soviet invasion of Manchuria

Commanders
- Notable commanders: Filipp Oktyabrsky; Arseny Golovko; Pavel Abankin; Neon Antonov

The Amur Military Flotilla (AMF; Russian: Амурская военная флотилия, romanized: Amurskaya voyennaya flotiliya) was a naval flotilla on the Amur River in the Russian Far East.

== History ==
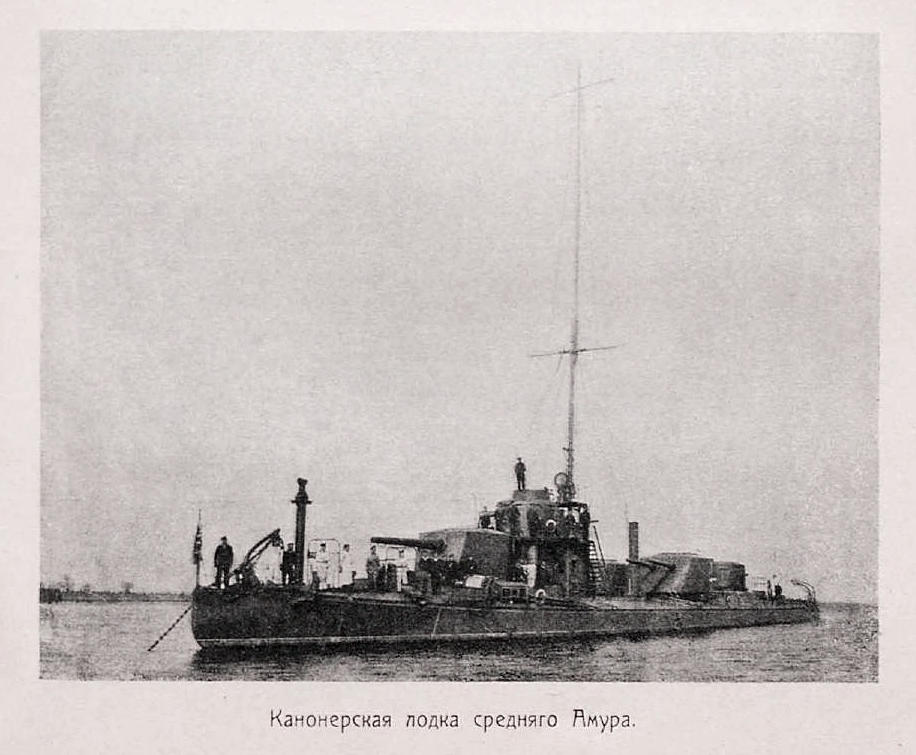
An Amur River Flotilla Shkval-class armoured turret river gunboat (an illustration in the Sytin's Military Encyclopedia, 1911)

In 1900, the Russians formed a temporary flotilla on the Amur from private steamers and barges. Initially, it served transportation purposes during the Russo-Japanese War of 1904–1905. Officially, the AMF was created in April 1905 as the riverine Separate Vessel Detachment (Russian: Отдельный отряд судов) of the Siberian Military Flotilla to defend the China–Russia border and secure water communications in the Amur River basin. The detachment was reorganized into the independent Amur River Flotilla (Russian: Амурская речная флотилия) on 11 December [O.S. 28 November] 1908. In 1910, the Amur River Flotilla comprised 28 vessels, including eight armoured turret river gunboats and ten smaller river gunboats. In December 1917, the Amur River Flotilla sided with Soviet Russia, and in February 1918, it joined the newly created Red Fleet to fight in the Russian Civil War.

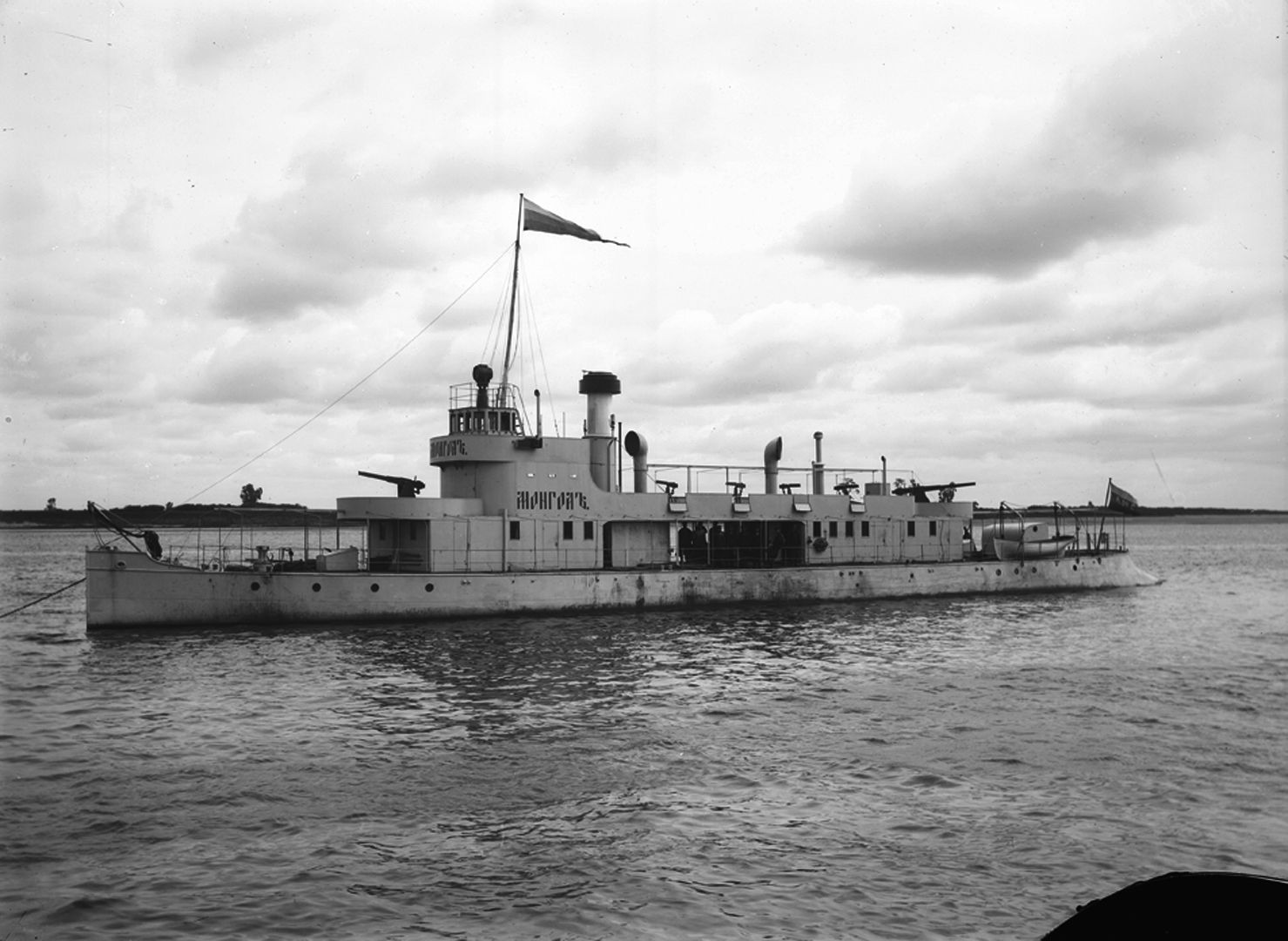
The Amur River Flotilla Buryat-class river gunboat Mongol (an illustration in the Sytin's Military Encyclopedia, 1911)

In September 1918, Japanese forces captured the naval base in Khabarovsk and almost all of the flotilla's vessels during their intervention in Siberia, putting them to their own use. In the spring of 1920, the government of the newly established Far Eastern Republic re-formed the flotilla, subsequently incorporating it into its People's Revolutionary Army as the Red Amur River Flotilla (Russian: Красная Амурская речная флотилия). In April 1921, the flotilla was incorporated into the republic's newly established Naval Force. After the Far Eastern Republic was incorporated into the Russian SFSR in November 1922, the Far Eastern Republic Naval Force was transformed into the Naval Forces of the Far East of the Russian SFSR, and its riverine formation became the Amur River Military Flotilla (Russian: Амурская речная военная флотилия).

Following the formation of the Soviet Union, the flotilla grew in size from 1925 to 1926 after diplomacy secured the return of many vessels captured by the Japanese. Following the disbandment of the Soviet Naval Forces of the Far East in 1926, the Amur River Military Flotilla became an independent formation and was renamed the Far Eastern Military Flotilla (Russian: Дальневосточная военная флотилия) in 1927. In 1929, the Far Eastern Military Flotilla included four river monitors (formerly classified as armoured turret river gunboats), four river gunboats, three armoured motor gunboats, one minelayer, two minesweepers, one seaplane tender (a reclassified armoured turret river gunboat converted into a floatplane carrier), and two patrol boats. The flotilla also used seven steam vessels, 12 barges, and two harbour launches of the Amur River Shipping Company that were commissioned into naval service. The 68th Independent River Hydroaviation Detachment (14 Polikarpov MR-1 floatplanes) and a rifle battalion were placed under the flotilla command. In 1930, the Far Eastern Military Flotilla was awarded with the Order of the Red Banner for its successful military operations during the Sino-Soviet conflict of 1929.

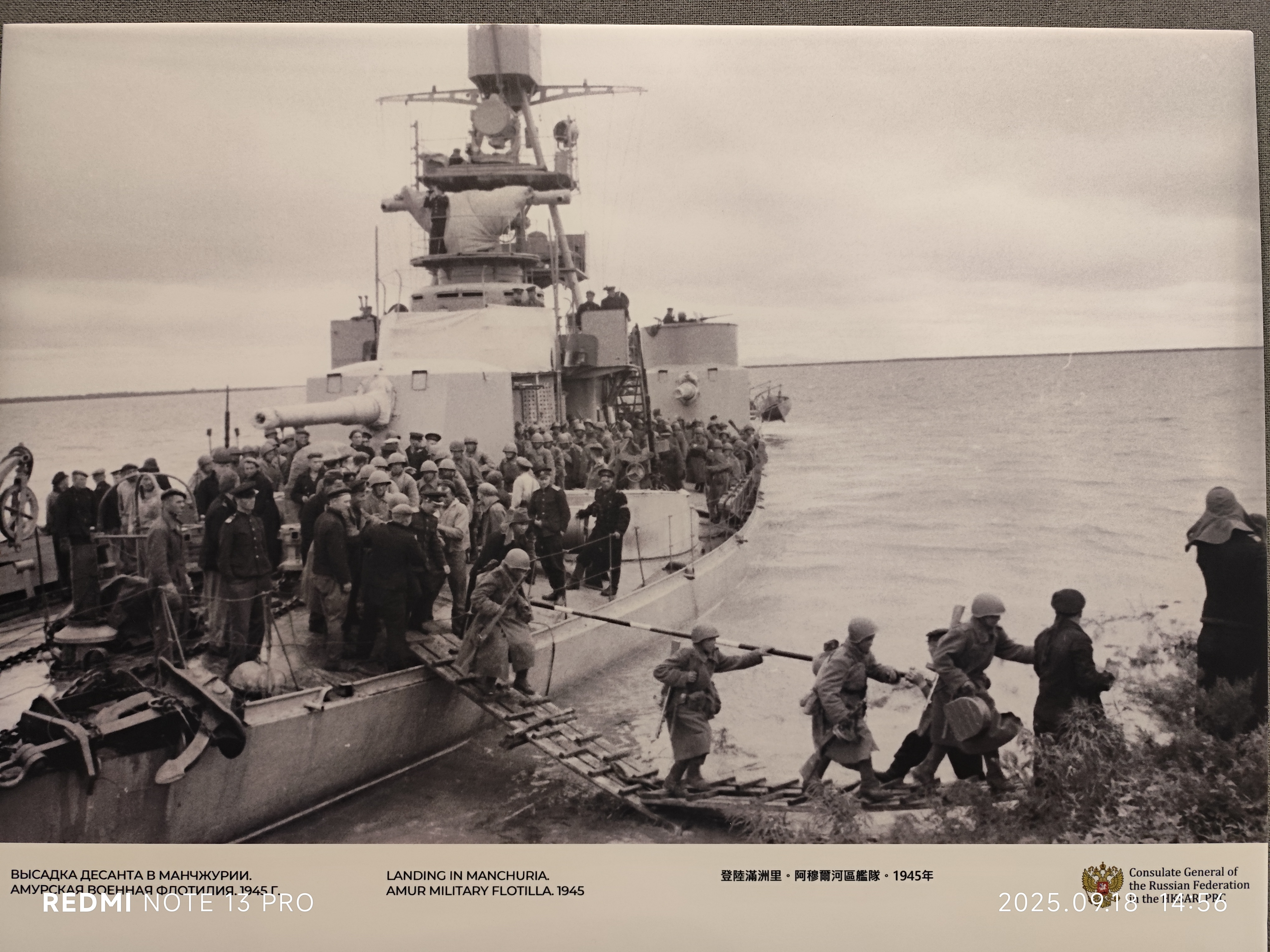
Soviet 15th Army troops landing from an Amur Military Flotilla Shkval-class river monitor (originally classified as an armoured turret river gunboat) during the Manchurian Operation of 1945

In 1931, the Far Eastern Military Flotilla was renamed the Amur Military Flotilla. Neon Antonov (1907–1948) was transferred to command the flotilla in preparation for the war against Japan. During the operation, the AMF (eight monitors, 11 gunboats, 52 armoured motor gunboats, c. 70 aircraft) under the command of Antonov cooperated with the armies of the 1st and the 2nd Far Eastern Fronts on the Amur, Ussuri, and Sungari rivers and Lake Khanka.

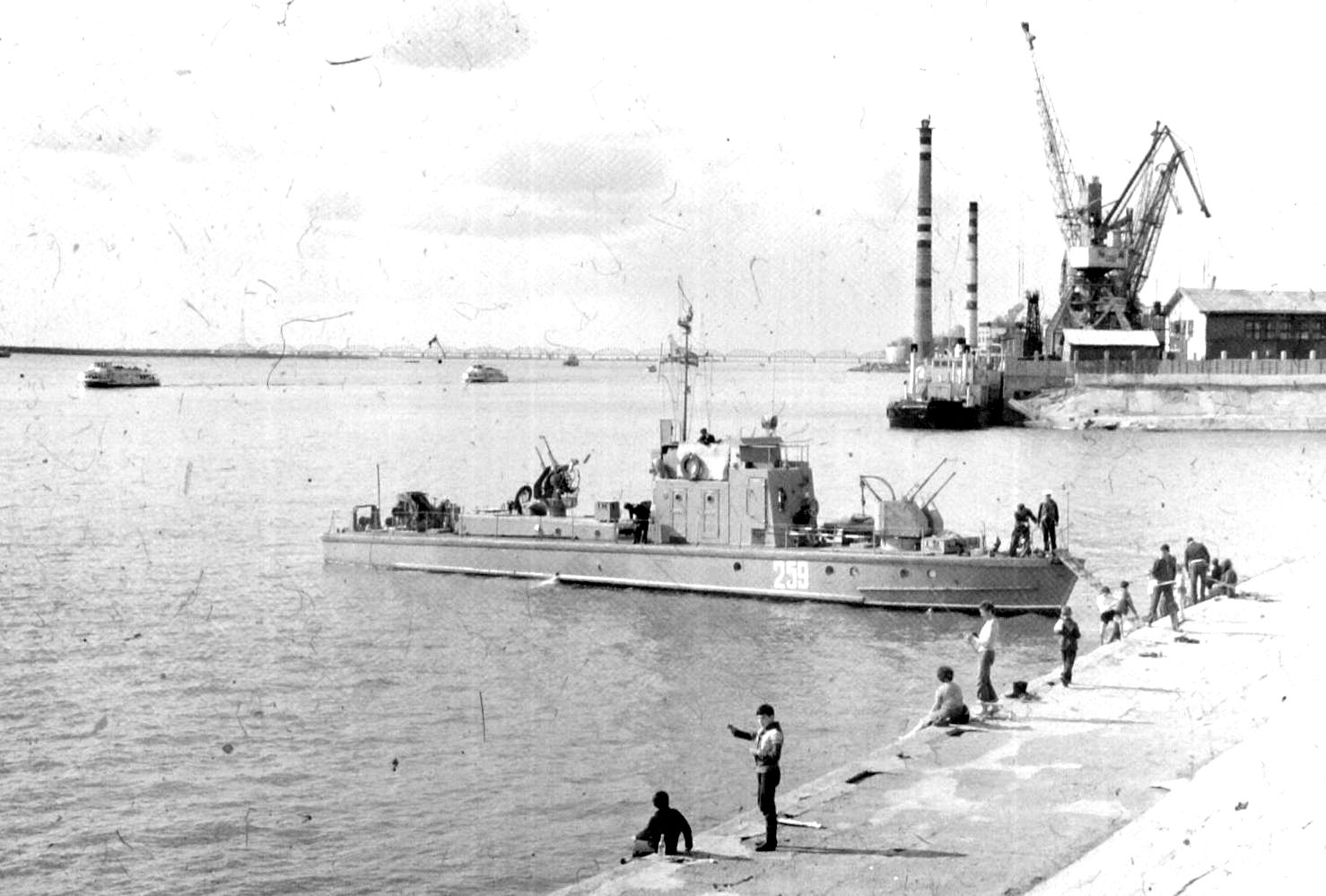
A TR-40-class river minesweeper, Amur River Naval Base; Khabarovsk, 1982

In 1955, the Amur Military Flotilla was reorganized into the Amur River Naval Base (Russian: Амурская военно-речная база) of the Soviet Pacific Fleet.

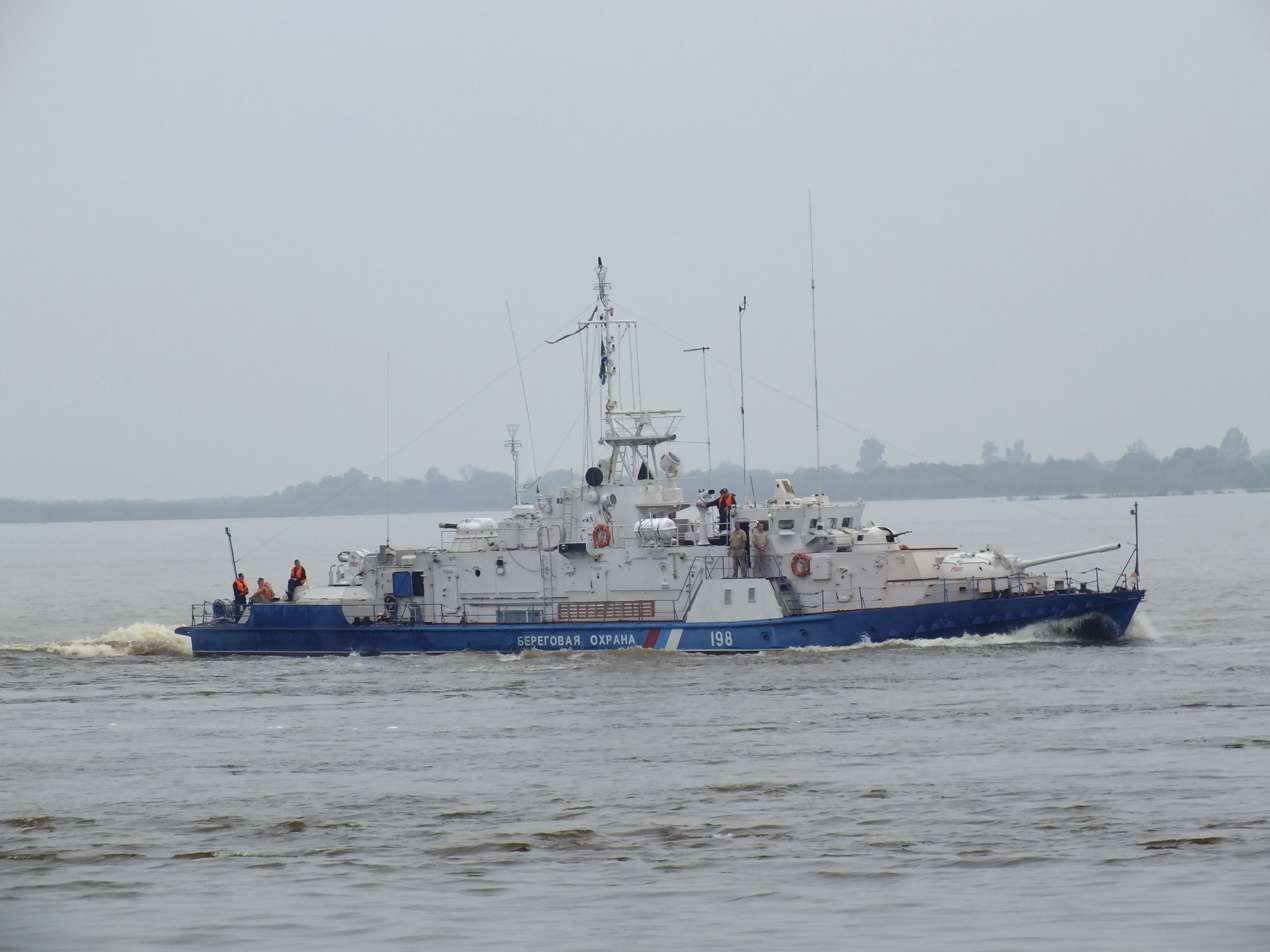
The Russian Coast Guard Vosh-class river patrol craft Vasiliy Poyarkov in 2014, formerly a unit of the Amur River Border Flotilla

On February 7, 1995, the Amur River Border Flotilla (Russian: Амурская пограничная речная флотилия) was formed from the Amur River Naval Base and transferred to the Russian Border Troops. The Amur River Border Flotilla was disbanded on June 7, 1998. The naval assets of the former Amur River Border Flotilla were transferred to border guard detachments guarding the China–Russia border in the Amur River basin.

== See also ==
- Sungari Offensive Operation
- Evacuation of Manchukuo
