= Yelatomsky Uyezd =

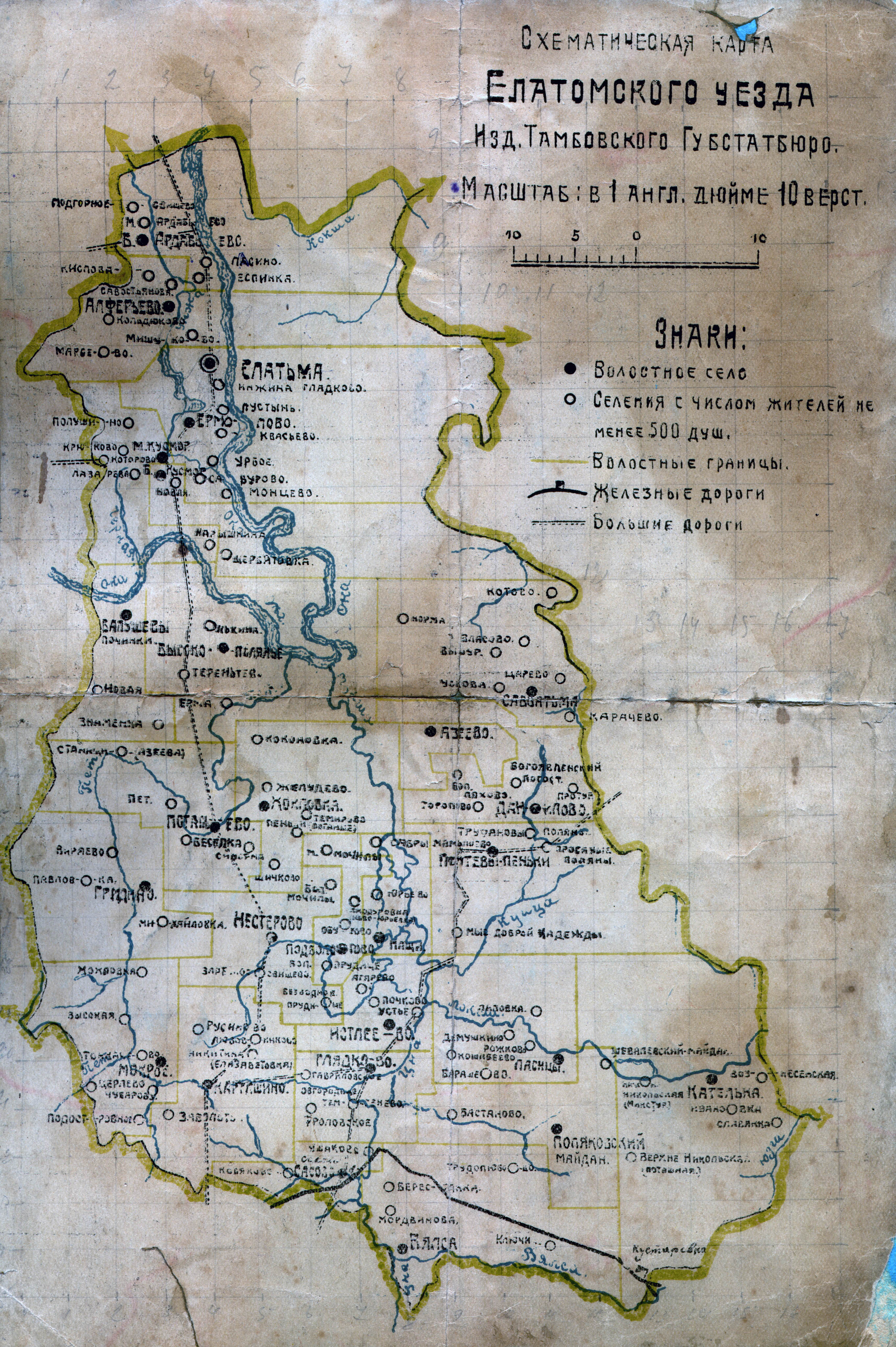
Map of Yelatomsky Uyezd in the Tambov Governorate

Yelatomsky Uyezd (Ела́томский уезд) was one of the subdivisions of the Tambov Governorate of the Russian Empire. It was situated in the northern part of the governorate. Its administrative centre was Yelatma.

== Demographics ==
At the time of the Russian Empire Census of 1897, Yelatomsky Uyezd had a population of 141,027. Of these, 95.7% spoke Russian and 4.2% Tatar as their native language.
