= 10th Air Army =

- Active: 1942–1949
- Branch: Soviet Air Force
- Part of: Far Eastern Front

The 10th Air Army was a unit of the Soviet Air Forces during World War II and the Cold War years.

== World War II ==
The unit was originally formed on Sakhalin Island on August 15, 1942, on the basis of the Air Force of the 25th Army of the Far Eastern Front of the USSR Armed Forces.

In August-early September 1945, the 10th Air Army as part of the 2nd Far Eastern Front, participated in the Sungari Offensive Operation, during which it covered the units of the 15th Army, supported the landing of the Amur Flotilla in the city of Fuyuan, then the offensive towards Qiqihar. The efforts of the 18th Corps disrupted the enemy's rail traffic.

A number of the Army's formations performed combat missions during the Invasion of South Sakhalin and Invasion of the Kuril Islands. During the period of hostilities, the 10th Air Army carried out about 3297 sorties.

On 3 September 1945 it included:

- 18th Mixed Aviation Corps
  - 96th Assault Aviation Division
  - 296th Fighter Aviation Division
  - 777th Fighter Aviation Regiment
  - 140th Reconnaissance Aviation Squadron
  - 28th Artillery Correction Squadron
- 83rd Bomber Aviation Division
- 128th Mixed Aviation Division
- 255th Mixed Aviation Division
- 253rd Assault Aviation Division
- 29th Fighter Aviation Division
- 254th Fighter Aviation Division
- 7th Reconnaissance Aviation Regiment
- 411th Artillery Correction Regiment
- 344th Transport Aviation Regiment

== Cold War ==
In July 1948 it was transferred to Vozzhayevka airfield west of Khabarovsk.

By a directive of 10 January 1949, it became the 29th Air Army.

As of 1950, the army operated airfields at Vozzhayevka, Pozdeyevka (Pozdeevka), Zavitinsk (Zavitaya), and Kuibyshevka.

In 1957, the 29th Air Army was amalgamated with the 54th Air Army, and became the 1st Special Far Eastern Air Army.

== Commanders ==
- 27.07.1942 - 16.09.1944 : Major General of Aviation Vasiliy Aleksandrovich Vinogradov.
- 16.09.1944 - 19.05.1945 : Colonel David Yakovlevich Slobozhan.
- 09.05.1945 - 02.04.1946 : Colonel General of Aviation Pavel Fedorovich Zhigarev.
- 25.05.1946 - 12.01.1949 : Lieutenant General of Aviation Nikolay Filippovich Papivin.
