= Neon Antonov =

Soviet admiral (1907–1948)

Neon Vasilyevich Antonov
- Неон Васильевич Антонов
- Born: 19 January 1907; Kraskovo, Moskovsky Uyezd, Moscow Governorate, Russian Empire
- Died: 24 October 1948 (aged 41); Khabarovsk, Khabarovsk Krai, Russian SFSR, USSR
- Military career
- Allegiance: Soviet Union
- Branch: Soviet Navy
- Service years: 1926–1948
- Rank: Rear Admiral
- Commands: Amur Military Flotilla
- Conflicts: Soviet–Japanese Border Wars; Battle of Lake Khasan; World War II; Eastern Front; Soviet–Japanese War; Operation August Storm
- Awards: Hero of the Soviet Union

Neon Vasilyevich Antonov (Russian: Неон Васильевич Антонов; 19 January [O.S. 6 January] 1907 – 24 October 1948) was a Soviet Navy rear admiral and recipient of the title of Hero of the Soviet Union during World War II.

== Early life ==
Antonov was born on 19 January 1907 in the village of Kraskovo in Moscow Governorate to railway worker Vasily Nikiforovich and Tatyana Timofeevna. He graduated from a nine-year school in 1925 in Kolomna and began his career in the same year. He joined the Komsomol and was an activist of the local committee of the Komsomol. He worked at the Kolomna station as a clerk in a commodity office and then as an electrical inspector.

== Military career ==
On a Komsomol ticket, he was sent to serve in the Soviet Navy in October 1926. In 1930, he graduated from the M.V. Frunze Naval School and was sent to the Far East, where he served in the Marine Border Guard of the Joint State Political Directorate. He served as a watchman in a PS-10 border ship and later was transferred as a navigator onboard border patrol ship Vorovsky from February 1932. In September 1933, he was appointed as assistant commander of the ship and from December 1933, he served as the assistant chief of staff of the border flotilla of the NKVD in the Soviet Far East.

From April 1936, he served as commander of Vorovsky, which took part in the guarding of Soviet maritime border and combatting intruders in the Okhotsk, Bering and Chukchi Seas. During the Battle of Lake Khasan, Vorovsky escorted transports delivering military cargo and reinforcements from Vladivostok to the battle zone.

In January 1940, Antonov was sent to study at the RK Navy K.E. Voroshilov Naval Academy.

=== World War II ===
==== Eastern Front ====
Following the outbreak of Operation Barbarossa in June 1941, Antonov was released ahead of schedule from his second year at the command faculty of the Naval Academy by the order of Admiral Nikolai Kuznetsov. On the same year, he became a member of the Communist Party of the Soviet Union.

In June 1941, he was appointed commander of the 1st Division of gunboats of the detachment within the Red Banner Baltic Fleet. His division in the defense of Tallinn, supporting a few military units on the land defense front with naval gunfire. During the evacuation of Tallinn, Antonov commanded convoy No. 2, which consisted of 10 transport and auxiliary ships with 17 escort ships. His convoy suffered the smallest losses of all four convoys which participated in the evacuation with only two transport ships sunk. The escort ships arrived at the port of Kronstadt. Gunboats under Antonov's command took part in the defense of Leningrad.

From January 1942, he served as the Chief of Staff of the Baltic Fleet Coastal Defense and from August 1942, he served as the Chief of Staff of the Onega detachment of ships of the Baltic Fleet. In December 1942, the Onega detachment was deployed to the Onega Military Flotilla and Antonov was appointed chief of staff of the flotilla and briefly served as its commander from July to August 1943. He received the military rank of Captain 1st rank on 25 May 1943 and on 29 December, he was awarded the Order of the Red Banner. The ships of the flotilla covered and supported the coastal flanks of the troops of the Karelian Front with naval fire and were responsible for the delivery of cargo and troops along Lake Onega while defending from German and Finnish aerial attacks on the lake.

Antonov served as commander of the Onega Military Flotilla from January to August 1944. Under his leadership, the flotilla successfully took part in the Svir-Petrozavodsk Offensive Operation. In the first days of the operation, the ships assisted the troops of the front including tactical landings during the Vyborg–Petrozavodsk offensive. From the period from 21 June to 28 June 1944, the ships and auxiliary vessels of the flotilla transported over 48 thousand personnel, 212 tanks, 446 guns, and a significant amount of other equipment and various cargoes.

By decree of the Presidium of the Supreme Soviet of the USSR of 21 July 1944, for the skillful and courageous leadership of the fighting near Petrozavodsk, Antonov was awarded the Order of Ushakov, 2nd class.

From August to September 1944, he served as the Chief of Staff of the Riga Naval Defense Region of the Baltic Fleet. In September 1944, he was appointed as the first commander of the Porkkala Naval Base in Finland. In this post, in addition to organizing submarine raids against enemy convoys, he was also responsible for providing escorts for transport ships from Sweden and hence preventing losses among them.

==== Far Eastern Front ====
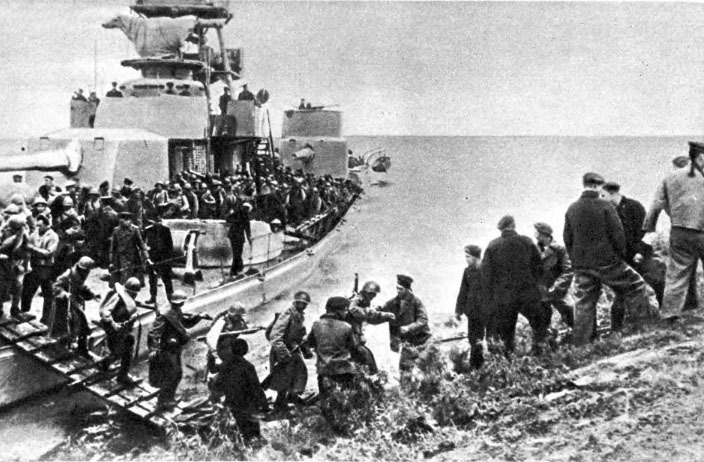
Soviet troops of the 15th Army crossing the Sungari aboard a monitor of the Amur Flotilla (1945)

After the defeat of Nazi Germany in May 1945, Antonov was assigned to the Far East in June 1945, where he was appointed as commander of the Amur Military Flotilla. The flotilla consisted of 126 warships including 8 monitors, 11 gunboats, more than 50 armored boats, minesweepers, minelayers, floating anti-aircraft batteries and others, as well as its own Air Force which consisted of 68 aircraft.

During Soviet–Japanese War of 1945, the Amur Military Flotilla operationally became a subordinate to the 2nd Far Eastern Front. In the first days of the Soviet invasion of Manchuria, the flotilla ensured the crossing of Red Army troops across the Amur River and the mass transfer of front troops with heavy weapons to the southern bank of the Amur. Later, the main forces of the flotilla set off on an unprecedented naval campaign up the Sungari River, where they supported the advance of Soviet troops along the river. Along the Sungari, the ships of the flotilla penetrated into the central part of Manchukuo to the city of Harbin, where they conducted numerous tactical landings in the rear of the Japanese positions and destroyed the coastal fortified Japanese positions with naval gunfire. As a result of the operation, the sailors of the Amur flotilla captured all the ships of Manchukuo River Defence Fleet in Harbin, which consisted of 30 warships and numerous tugboats, passenger/freight ships, barges, and small auxiliary and civil ships.

By decree of the Presidium of the Supreme Soviet of the USSR of 14 September 1945, "for the exemplary performance of the combat missions of the command on the front against the Japanese imperialists and the courage and heroism shown at the same time", Antonov was awarded the title of Hero of the Soviet Union with the Order of Lenin and the Gold Star medal.

== Later life ==
After the end of war, he continued to command the flotilla. Antonov was elected to the Soviet of Nationalities of the Supreme Soviet of the USSR from the Jewish Autonomous Region of Khabarovsk Krai.

He died in an accident while fishing on 24 October 1948, at the age of 41. He is buried near the monument to the sailors of Amur River Flotilla who died in the Russian Civil War, at a cemetery in the Krasnoflotsky District of Khabarovsk.

== Awards and honors ==
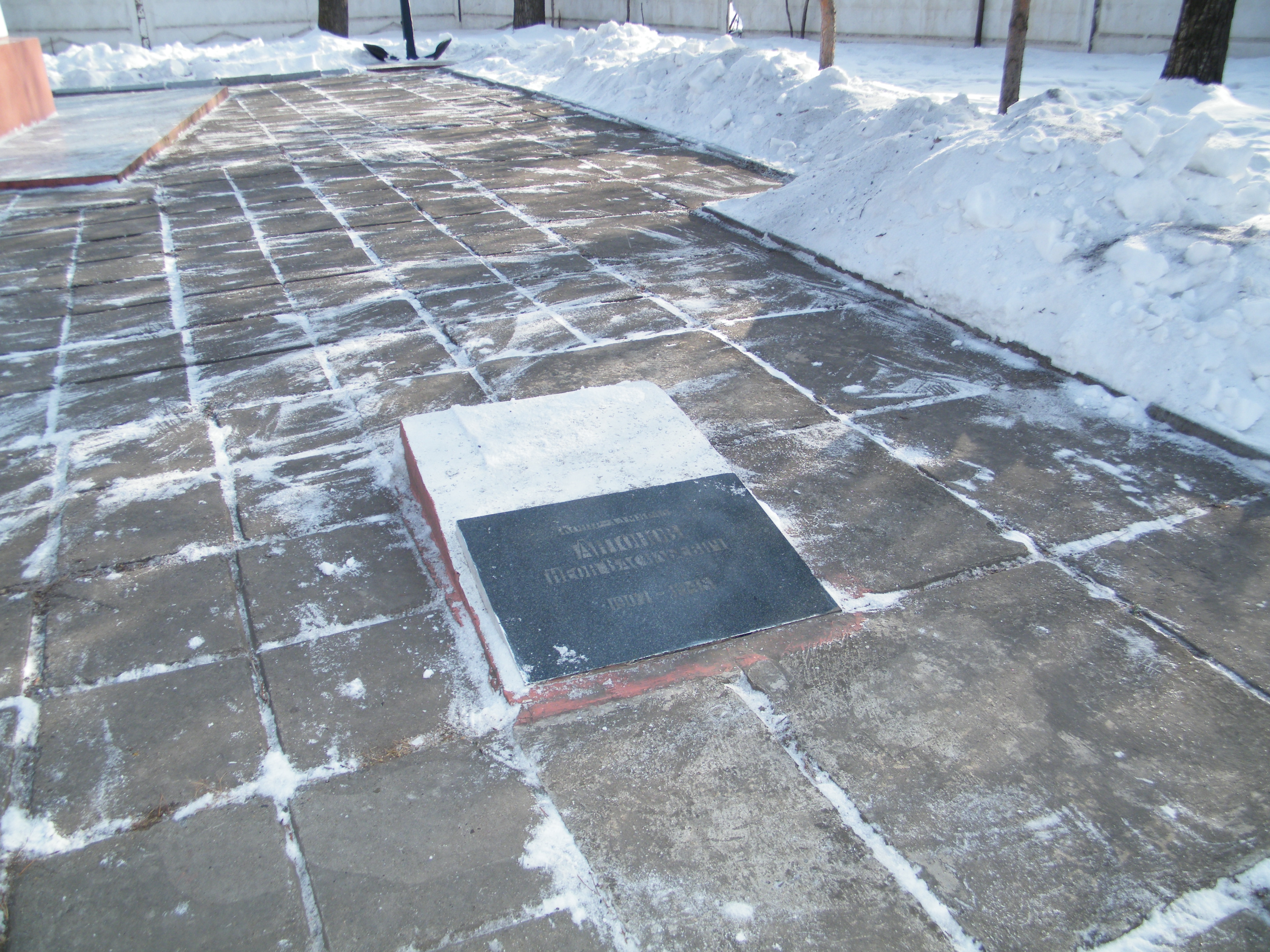
Admiral Antonov's grave in Khabarovsk

Hero of the Soviet Union (14 September 1945)
Order of Lenin (14 September 1945)
Order of the Red Banner, twice (22 February 1944, 5 November 1946)
Order of Ushakov, 2nd class (22 July 1944)
Order of the Patriotic War, 1st class (1 November 1945)
Order of the Red Star (3 November 1944)
Medal "For the Defence of Leningrad" (1942)
Medal "For the Victory over Germany in the Great Patriotic War 1941–1945" (1945)
Medal "For the Victory over Japan" (1945)
Jubilee Medal "30 Years of the Soviet Army and Navy" (1948)

=== Other honors ===
- A class of coastal logistics ships operated by the Russian Coast Guard was named in honor of him.
- A bust honoring him is placed at the Alley of Heroes monument in Kolomna.
- In Petrozavodsk, there a memorial plaque honoring Antonov, as well as a street is named after him.
- In Khabarovsk, a memorial plaque honoring is placed on the building of the naval garrison in the city.
- A border patrol ship of the 10th Separate Brigade of Border Guard Ships was named in honor of him. The ship was in service from 1976 to 2000 and was based in Vladivostok.
- The Museum of Military Glory named after N.V. Antonov is at the gymnasium No. 56 in Kraskovo.
