= Seiichi Kita =

WWII Japanese Army officer (1886–1947)

- 喜多 誠一
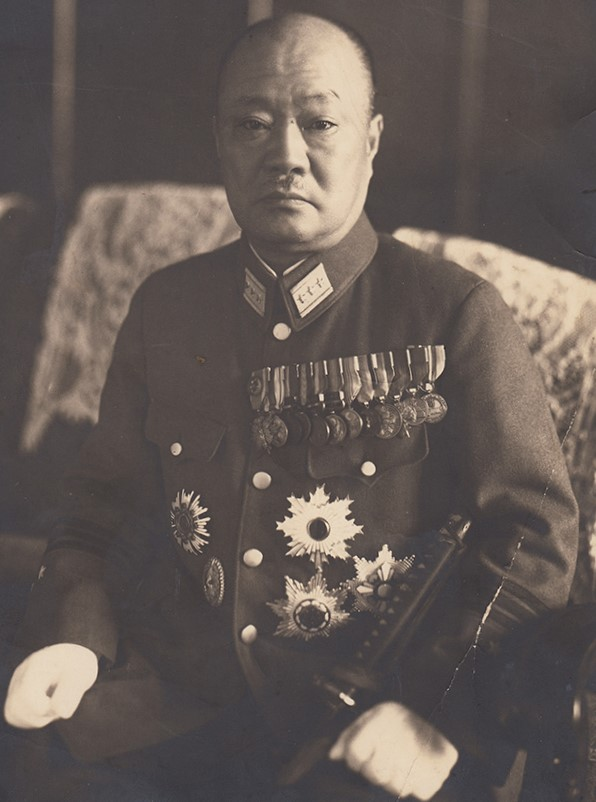
- Born: 20 December 1886; Shiga, Japan
- Died: 7 August 1947 (aged 60); Khabarovsk, Soviet Union
- Military career
- Allegiance: Empire of Japan
- Branch: Imperial Japanese Army
- Service years: 1907–1945
- Rank: General
- Commands: 37th Infantry Regiment; IJA 14th Division; IJA 6th Army; IJA 12th Army; IJA 1st Area Army
- Conflicts: World War II; Pacific War; Soviet invasion of Manchuria (POW)
- Other work: Military attaché to England

Seiichi Kita (喜多 誠一, Kita Seiichi; December 20, 1886 – August 7, 1947) was a general in the Imperial Japanese Army, who commanded the Japanese First Area Army from September 1944 until the end of World War II. He died as a prisoner in the Soviet Union.

== Life ==
Kita became an infantry officer in 1907 and was military attaché to England in 1927. He served in several staff positions in China, until March 9, 1940, when he became commander of the IJA 14th Division, based in Northern China.

In the late 1930s he was placed in command of the Japanese special intelligence services operating in north China, which had the role of managing contact with local Chinese collaborators. As part of this, he tried to recruit such figures as former warlords Cao Kun and Wu Peifu to head the collaborationist regime the Japanese established in the region. It was on Major General Kita's suggestions that the puppet Provisional Government of the Republic of China was eventually established in December 1937. Thus he became known as the foremost Japanese "puppeteer" in north China.

On October 15, 1941, he was appointed Commander of the IJA 6th Army based in Hailar until March 1, 1943, when he took over the command of the IJA 12th Army. In February 1944, he was recalled to Japan and was attached to the General Staff. On September 26, 1944, he became Commander of the First Area Army, with which he fought unsuccessfully against the Red Army, when the Soviet Union invaded Manchukuo at the end of the war. Together with his surviving soldiers, he became prisoner of war in Siberia. He was never repatriated and is thought to have died in a prison camp in 1947 or 1952.
