= Fifth Army (Japan) =

Japanese Fifth Army
- Active: January 15, 1905 – August 15, 1945
- Country: Empire of Japan
- Branch: Imperial Japanese Army
- Type: Infantry
- Role: Corps
- Garrison/HQ: Andong, Manchukuo
- Nicknames: Jōshudan (城集団, Castle)
- Engagements: Soviet invasion of Manchuria

The Japanese 5th Army (第5軍, Dai-go gun) was an army of the Imperial Japanese Army based in Manchukuo from the Russo-Japanese War until the end of World War II. During World War II it was under the overall command of the Kwantung Army.

== History ==
=== Russo-Japanese War ===
The Japanese 5th Army, then known as the Yalu River Army, was initially raised on January 15, 1905, in the final stages of the Russo-Japanese War under the command of General Kawamura Kageaki out of only the 11th Infantry Division and three reserve brigades. It took successfully part in the battle of Mukden, when the 5th Army flanked the Russian left wing. It was disbanded at Mukden in January, 1906 after the signing of the Treaty of Portsmouth at the end of the war.

=== Second Sino-Japanese War and World War II ===
The Japanese 5th Army was raised again on December 7, 1937, in Manchukuo as a garrison force to guard the eastern borders against possible incursions by the Soviet Red Army. As it was based on the eastern frontier, it was not a participant in the Nomonhan Incident, but was temporarily disbanded on February 26, 1938. It was re-established on May 19, 1939, under the direct control of the Imperial Japanese Army General Staff. It afterwards came under the command of the Japanese First Area Army, under the overall command of the Kwantung Army, and was used primarily as a training and garrison force. Its equipment and experienced troops were siphoned off to other commands in the southeast Asia theatre of operations as the war situation gradually deteriorated for Japan. By the time of the Soviet invasion of Manchuria, its poorly equipped and poorly trained forces were no longer a match for the experienced battle-hardened Soviet armored divisions, and it was driven back into defensive positions in Andong Province along the Korean border by the time of the surrender of Japan. It was formally disbanded at Jixi.

== List of Commanders ==
=== Commanding officer ===
	Name	From	To
1	General Kawamura Kageaki	15 January 1905	January 1906
X	Disbanded		
2	Lieutenant General Motoo Furusho	8 December 1937	26 February 1938
X	Disbanded		
3	Lieutenant General Kenji Doihara	19 May 1939	28 September 1940
4	Lieutenant General Shigeichi Hada	28 September 1940	15 October 1941
5	Lieutenant General Jo Iimura	15 October 1941	29 October 1943
6	Lieutenant General Toshimichi Uemura	29 October 1943	27 June 1944
7	Lieutenant General Shimizu Tsunenori	27 June 1944	September 1945

=== Chief of Staff ===
	Name	From	To
1	Major General Uchiyama Kojirō	15 January 1905	January 1906
X	Disbanded		
2	Lieutenant General Masatake Shina	8 December 1937	26 February 1938
X	Disbanded		
3	Lieutenant General Shizuo Kurashige	19 May 1939	9 March 1940
4	Lieutenant General Shiro Makino	9 March 1940	24 April 1941
5	Lieutenant General Senichi Tasaka	24 April 1941	1 July 1942
6	Major General Masazumi Inada	1 July 1942	22 February 1943
7	Lieutenant General Tadasu Kataoka	22 February 1943	3 August 1944
8	Major General Shigesada Kawagoe	3 August 1944	September 1945
