= First Area Army =

- Active: July 2, 1942 - August 15, 1945
- Country: Empire of Japan
- Branch: Imperial Japanese Army
- Type: Infantry
- Role: Field Army
- Garrison/HQ: Mukden
- Nickname: 鋭 (Ei = “sharp”)
- Engagements: Soviet invasion of Manchuria

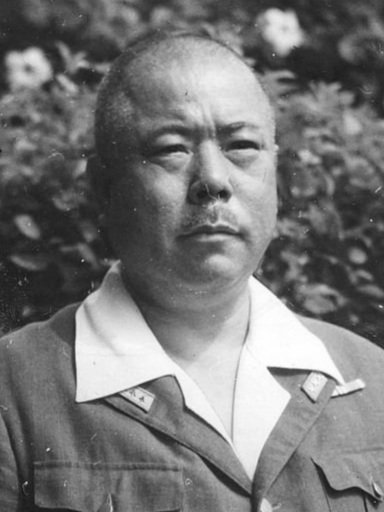
Yamashita Tomoyuki, Lieutenant-General, Commander of the Japanese 25th Army

The First Area Army (第1方面軍, Dai-ichi hōmen gun) was a field army of the Imperial Japanese Army during World War II, based in northern Manchukuo and active in combat against the Soviet Union in the closing stages of the war.

== History ==
The Japanese 1st Area Army was formed on July 4, 1942 under the control of the Kwantung Army as a military reserve and garrison force to maintain security and public order in northern Manchukuo as many veteran divisions of the Kwantung Army were transferred to the various southern fronts in the Pacific War. It consisted mostly of minimally-trained reservists, conscripted students and home guard militia, without adequate weapons or supplies. The 1st Area Army was headquartered in Dunhua, in what is now the Yanbian Korean Autonomous Prefecture of Jilin Province, China.

The units of the 1st Area Army proved to be no match for the Red Army when the Soviet Union invaded Manchukuo at the end of World War II. Without adequate armor, ammunition or leadership, many units broke and fled, or surrendered en masse. Many surviving soldiers of the 1st Area Army, including its commanding officer General Seiichi Kita, became prisoners in Siberia and other parts of the Soviet Union after the surrender of Japan on August 15, 1945.

== List of Commanders ==
=== Commanding officer ===
	Name	From	To
1	General Tomoyuki Yamashita	1 July 1942	26 September 1944
2	General Seiichi Kita	26 September 1944	15 August 1945

=== Chief of Staff ===
	Name	From	To
1	Major General Kitsuju Ayabe	1 July 1942	7 December 1942
2	Major General Tsunamasa Shidei	7 December 1942	16 October 1944
3	Major General Tadao Teragaki	16 October 1944	1 April 1945
4	Major General Ryozo Sakurai	1 April 1945	15 August 1945
