= Burma campaign (1942–1943) =

Pacific War campaign during World War II

Burma campaign 1942–1943
- Part of the Burma campaign of World War II
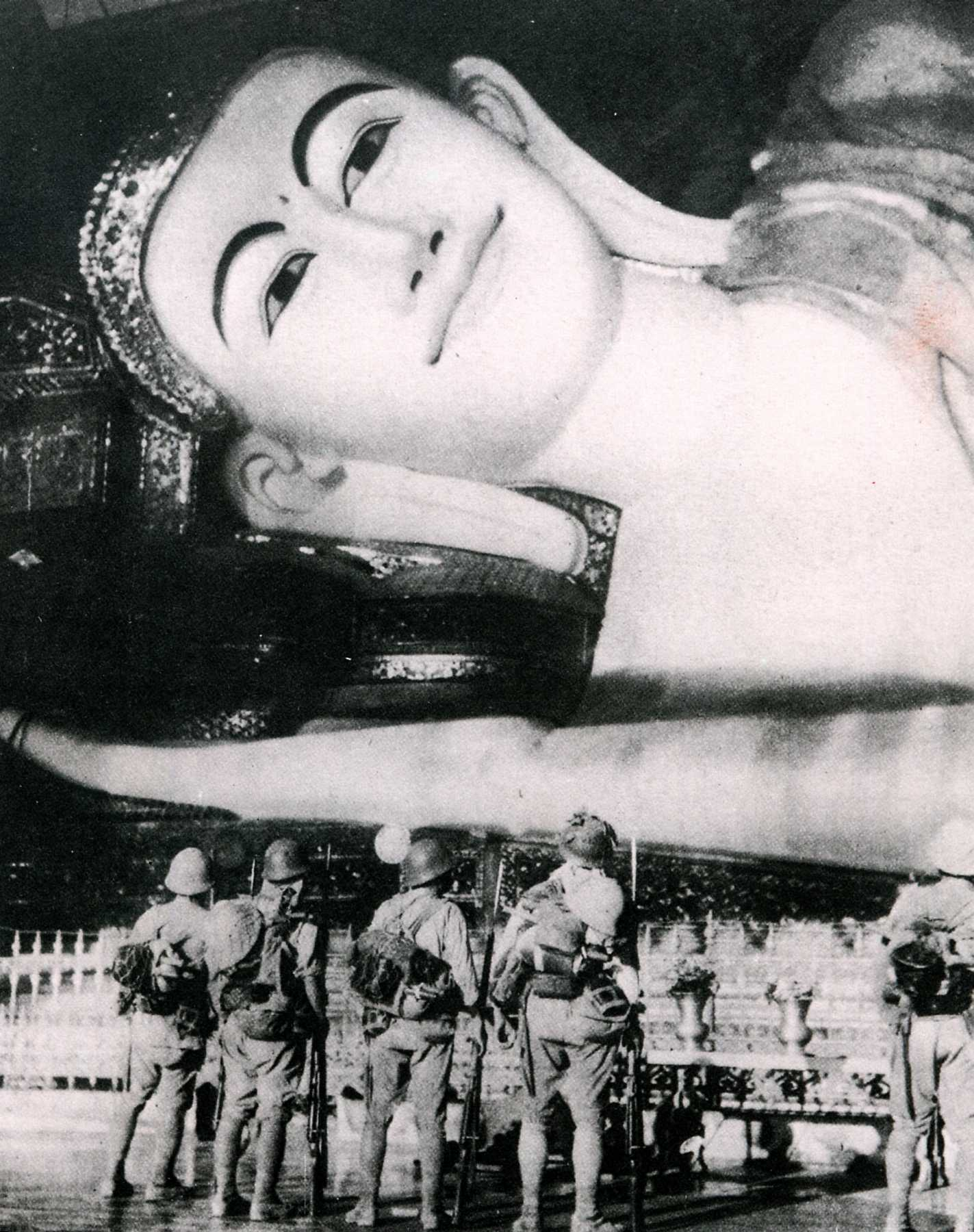
- Japanese troops at the Shwethalyaung Buddha in Pegu
Date	June 1942 – September 1943
Location	Burma
Result	Axis victory

Belligerents
United Kingdom; India; Burma; United States; China	Japan; State of Burma; (India) Azad Hind; Thailand

Commanders and leaders
Archibald Wavell; Noel Irwin; George Giffard; Joseph Stilwell	Shōjirō Iida; Masakazu Kawabe; Ba Maw; (India) Subhas Chandra Bose; (India) Mohan Singh; Plaek Phibunsongkhram

Casualties and losses
(United Kingdom) ~6,500 casualties (Note: Includes 916 killed and 4,141 wounded/missing during the Arakan campaign 1942–43, and 818 killed/captured and 600 wounded to the point of being unfit for service in the Chindit raids.)	(Empire of Japan) 1,800+ casualties (Note: 611 killed, 1,165 wounded (estimated), per official Japanese figures. Only the Arakan campaign is included.)

The Burma campaign in the South-East Asian Theatre of World War II took place over four years from 1942 to 1945. During the first year of the campaign, the Imperial Japanese Army with aid from Burmese insurgents had driven British forces and Chinese forces out of Burma, and occupied most of the country. From May to December 1942, most active campaigning ceased as the monsoon rains made tactical movement almost impossible in the forested and mountainous border between India and Burma, and both the Allies and Japanese faced severe logistical constraints.

When the rains ceased, the Allies launched two offensives. One, an attack in the coastal Arakan State, failed, with severe effects on Allied morale. This was restored partly by improvements to administration and training, and partly by the much-publicised results of a raid by troops under Brigadier Orde Wingate. This raid may also have goaded Japanese commanders into launching major offensives the following year, which failed disastrously.

== India and Burma, May – December 1942 ==
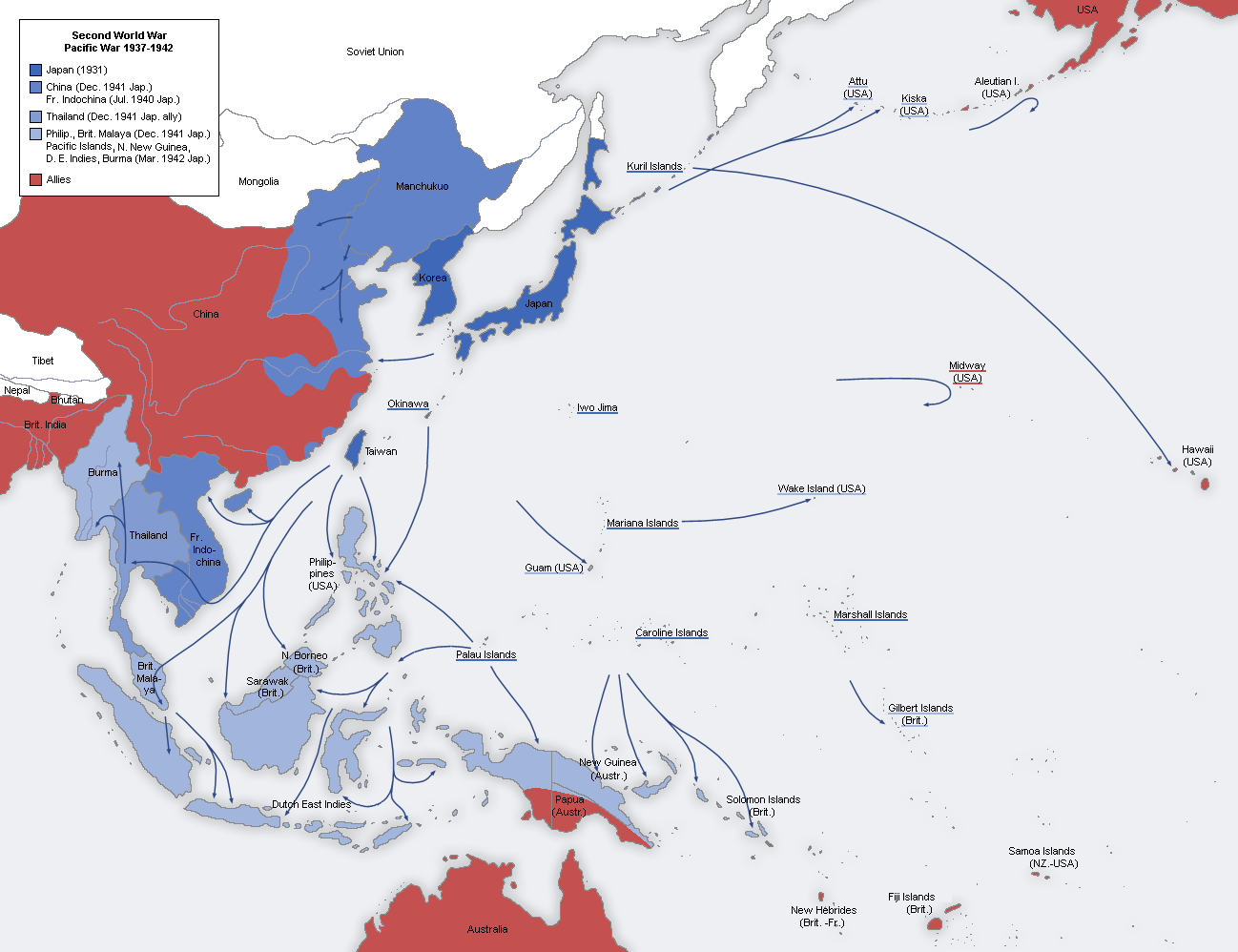
Japanese advance until mid-1942

A total of about 450,000 Allied troops faced 300,000 Japanese. However, both Allied and Japanese operations were constrained by terrain and logistics. The frontier region between Burma and India was for the most part almost impassable country, with very few practicable routes through the jungle-clad hills. The Japanese could make use of rail and river transport only as far as the port of Kalewa on the Chindwin River, while the Allies depended on inadequate rail and river links to Dimapur in the Brahmaputra River valley, from where a single road led to the base at Imphal.

=== Allies ===
The Far Eastern theatre was accorded the lowest priority by the Chiefs of Staff Committee in Britain. British military efforts were instead concentrated on the Middle Eastern theatre, partly in accordance with the declared "Germany First" policy of the United States government under President Franklin Roosevelt. Few resources were allocated to India, and indeed newly raised formations of the British Indian Army were being trained in desert warfare rather than for jungle warfare until December 1942, when it was clear that the North African Campaign was finished to all intents and purposes.

Allied efforts in India were also hampered by the disordered state of Eastern India at the time. In the aftermath of the Allied military disasters in the early months of 1942, there were violent Quit India movement protests in Bengal and Bihar, which required large numbers of British troops to suppress. There was also a disastrous famine in Bengal which may ultimately have led to 3 million deaths through starvation, disease and exposure. Although the immediate causes were a typhoon which devastated large areas in October 1942 and a premature scorched earth operation in Eastern Bengal to deny resources to the Japanese in case of invasion, the reserves of food available for relief were reduced by the loss of rice normally imported from Burma and Allied demands for exported rice in other theatres, while the dislocation caused by sporadic Japanese bombing, and corruption and inefficiency in the government of Bengal prevented any proper distribution of aid, or other drastic measures being taken for several months.

=== Axis ===
The Japanese were consolidating their position in Burma. Lieutenant General Shojiro Iida, commander of the Japanese Fifteenth Army, was asked by higher headquarters for his opinion as to whether to resume the offensive after the rains stopped. He in turn consulted the commanders of his forward divisions, who felt that the terrain was too difficult and the logistical problems could not be overcome. Lieutenant General Renya Mutaguchi, commanding the Japanese 18th Division, was particularly scathing. Plans for an attack were accordingly dropped.

Within Burma, the Japanese disbanded the Burma Independence Army, which had grown rapidly during the Japanese invasion of Burma, but was only loosely organised and in some cases was opposed to Japanese control. The Japanese replaced it with the Burma Defence Army, trained by Japanese officers. They also prepared to form a Burmese government (the State of Burma), which was eventually established in May 1943, under Ba Maw. This government had little real power, and the Japanese remained in control of most aspects of Burma's administration. The Burmese economy, already damaged by the earlier fighting, declined further through damage to the transport infrastructure (resulting from the fighting of the previous year and British demolitions) and lack of commercial markets for exported rice and other products.

Lieutenant General Iida made efforts to promote Burma's interests, but he was repeatedly overruled by directives from Tokyo, and was relieved in 1943, partly because he objected to Tokyo's economic policies in Burma.

== Operations ==
=== First Arakan campaign ===
In spite of their difficulties, the Allies mounted two operations during the 1942–1943 dry season. The first was a small scale offensive into the coastal Arakan region of Burma. The Indian Eastern Army under Lieutenant General Noel Irwin intended to reoccupy the Mayu peninsula and Akyab Island, which held an important airfield. Beginning on 21 December 1942, the 14th Indian Division advanced to Rathedaung and Donbaik, only a few miles from the end of the peninsula. Here they were halted by a small Japanese force (initially of only two battalions but with heavy artillery support) which occupied nearly impregnable bunkers. Indian and British troops made repeated frontal assaults without armoured support, and were thrown back with heavy casualties.

Japanese reinforcements, amounting to an understrength division, arrived from Central Burma. Crossing rivers and mountain ranges which the Allies had assumed to be impassable, they hit 14th Division's exposed left flank on 3 April 1943 and overran several units. The division's headquarters was replaced by that of 26th Indian Division, which attempted to hold a defensive line south of the town of Buthidaung, and even to surround the Japanese as they pressed their advantage. The exhausted units which the division had inherited were unable to hold this line and were forced to abandon much equipment and fall back almost to the Indian frontier.

Irwin was dismissed, partly as a result of this disaster. He made several disparaging remarks regarding the state of equipment, training and morale of Eastern Army. Although not wholly inaccurate, they were widely resented. Irwin's successor, General George Giffard, concentrated on restoring the army's administration and morale.

=== First Chindit expedition ===
The second action was much more controversial. Under the command of Brigadier Orde Wingate, the 77th Indian Infantry Brigade, better known as the Chindits, infiltrated through the Japanese front lines and marched deep into Burma with the initial aim of cutting the main north–south railway in Burma. The operation (codenamed Operation "Longcloth") had originally been conceived as part of a much larger coordinated offensive, which had to be aborted due to lack of supplies and shipping. Rather than let the Chindits' training be wasted, Wingate nevertheless carried out the operation, even though its original purpose was invalid.

Some 3,000 men entered Burma in seven columns. They caused some damage to the communications of the Japanese in northern Burma, cutting the railway for possibly two weeks. However, they suffered heavy casualties: 818 killed, wounded or missing, 27% of the original force. Those who did return were wracked with disease and quite often in dreadful physical condition. Though the operational results were questioned, both at the time and subsequently, the raid was used to great propaganda effect to prove to British and Indian soldiers that they could live, move and fight as effectively as the Japanese in the jungle, countering the impression created after the battles of early 1942 that the Japanese could not be beaten in such terrain.

It was also said by the Japanese commanders after the war that the Japanese in Burma decided later to take the offensive in 1944, rather than adopt a purely defensive stance, as a direct result of the Chindit operation.

=== Central Front ===
There was continual patrol activity and low-key fighting on the frontier south of Imphal, but neither army possessed the resources to mount decisive operations. 17th (Light) Indian Division held positions around the town of Tiddim at the end of a precarious supply line 100 miles (160 km) south of Imphal, and skirmished with units of the Japanese 33rd Division. The Japanese had a shorter and easier supply line from the port of Kalewa on the Chindwin River and had the upper hand for most of 1942 and 1943.

V Force, an irregular force raised by GHQ India in the frontier areas of Burma and India, also patrolled and scouted in the large areas controlled by neither army, but could have no decisive effect on Japanese operations.

=== Burma Road and the "Hump" ===
At American insistence, one of the overriding Allied strategic aims was the maintenance of supplies to the Nationalist Chinese government under Chiang Kai-shek. When the Japanese had occupied Burma, the supply route via Rangoon had been cut. The Americans organised an airlift of supplies over the Himalaya mountain range. The route, and the airlift itself, acquired the nickname of The Hump. There were heavy losses from the natural hazards of the route, and at this stage of the war, the Allied transport aircraft were vulnerable to Japanese fighter aircraft operating from Myitkyina airfield in northern Burma.

At the insistence of the American Joseph Stilwell, who was chief of staff to Chiang Kai-shek among other appointments, the Allies also began construct the Ledo Road to link India with China, which was to prove an enormous engineering task. As part of the preparations to drive this road through Japanese-occupied northern and eastern Burma, two divisions of Chinese troops who had retreated into India in 1942 were re-equipped and trained by the Americans at camps in Ramgarh in Bihar. Following Wingate's raid and the expansion of his force for the campaigning season of 1943–1944, the Americans also formed the long-range penetration unit which later became known as Merrill's Marauders and deployed them to Ledo.

The Americans also supplied logistical units (especially construction units and railway operating personnel) which improved and maintained the Allied railway lines and river transport in North Eastern India, in preparation for Allied offensives in 1944.

=== Fort Hertz ===
In mid-1942, a small reconnaissance party was parachuted into the Myitkyina area, to investigate Myitkyina and the outpost at Fort Hertz in the far north of Burma, which had been cut off from India. Fort Hertz was found to be still in Allied hands. Liaison and engineering parties were flown or parachuted into Fort Hertz, and a locally raised irregular force, the Kachin Levies, was established. The airstrip was improved to become an emergency landing strip for aircraft flying the "Hump" route.

Although the Kachin Levies were directly controlled at first by Eastern Army (and later by Fourteenth Army), they were later transferred to the American Northern Combat Area Command, to cooperate more closely with the impending American and Chinese advance from Ledo.

=== Burma Railway ===
Like the Allies, the Japanese sought to improve their lines of communication within South East Asia. To this end, they constructed the Burma Railway which linked Moulmein in Southern Burma with Bangkok in Siam. Construction began on 22 June 1942 and was completed on 17 October 1943. The project became notorious for the deaths among the labour force (90,000 out of 180,000 conscripted Asian labourers and 16,000 out of 60,000 Allied prisoners of war).

== Aftermath ==
=== Allied command changes ===
The Commander-in-Chief, India, General Archibald Wavell, was responsible for operations in Persia and Iraq (where there had been fears of a breakthrough by German forces in North Africa and the Caucasus until late 1942) and against the Japanese in Burma, and also for internal security in wide areas of India and the administration of the rapidly expanding Indian Army. His headquarters, GHQ India itself was derided as overstaffed and inefficient. The Australian war correspondent Wilfred Burchett described it as "... an antiquarium of Colonel Blimps".

In August 1943, the new Allied South East Asia Command was created, to take over control and planning of operations against the Japanese in Burma and the Indian Ocean. In November, Admiral Louis Mountbatten was appointed as Commander in Chief of the new command. Because the theatre was linked to the American administrative China Burma India Theater or CBI, and because increasing numbers of American air force units and logistical resources were being dispatched to India, General Stilwell was appointed Deputy Supreme Commander.

Wavell meanwhile became Viceroy of India, and immediately addressed the famine in Bengal, although the crisis was eased only when the Government in Britain was persuaded to ship relief supplies of food to Bengal. He was replaced as Commander in Chief of the Indian Army by General Claude Auchinleck, who had been relieved as Commander in Chief of the Middle East Command a year previously. During the Arakan campaign it had been noted that morale among the inadequately trained Indian troops had declined to the point where many desertions had occurred, and even defections to the Indian National Army. (Similar low morale among British troops manifested itself as apathy and very high rates of malaria infection.) Auchinleck reinvigorated the Indian Army's headquarters and its rear-area and training establishments. Other reforms were made to improve the Indian Army's morale; soldiers' pay was increased, non-commissioned officers and Viceroy's commissioned officers were given better training and more responsibility, and efforts were made to counter Indian National Army propaganda.

The Eastern Army was also split, into the Fourteenth Army, part of South East Asia Command and responsible for the conduct of operations in Manipur and the Arakan, and Eastern Command, which reported to GHQ India and was responsible for rear-area security and the lines of communication.

=== Japanese command changes and plans ===
In March 1943, the Japanese created a new army-level headquarters, the Burma Area Army, to control operations in Burma. Lieutenant General Masakazu Kawabe was appointed its Commander. The army took command of the Fifteenth Army in the north and east of the country, and at first directly controlled units in the south and west of the country. The Twenty-Eighth Army was created to assume the latter responsibility on 6 January 1944.

In August, Lieutenant General Iida was replaced as commander of the Fifteenth Army by Lieutenant General Mutaguchi, former commander of the 18th Division. From the moment he took charge, Mutaguchi forcefully advocated a bold offensive into India for the following year, in contrast to his earlier dismissal of the chances of such an attack succeeding. The offensive plan, codenamed U-Go, was endorsed by Imperial General Headquarters and was launched the following year.
