= Jun Ushiroku =

Japanese general (1884–1973)

- 後宮 淳
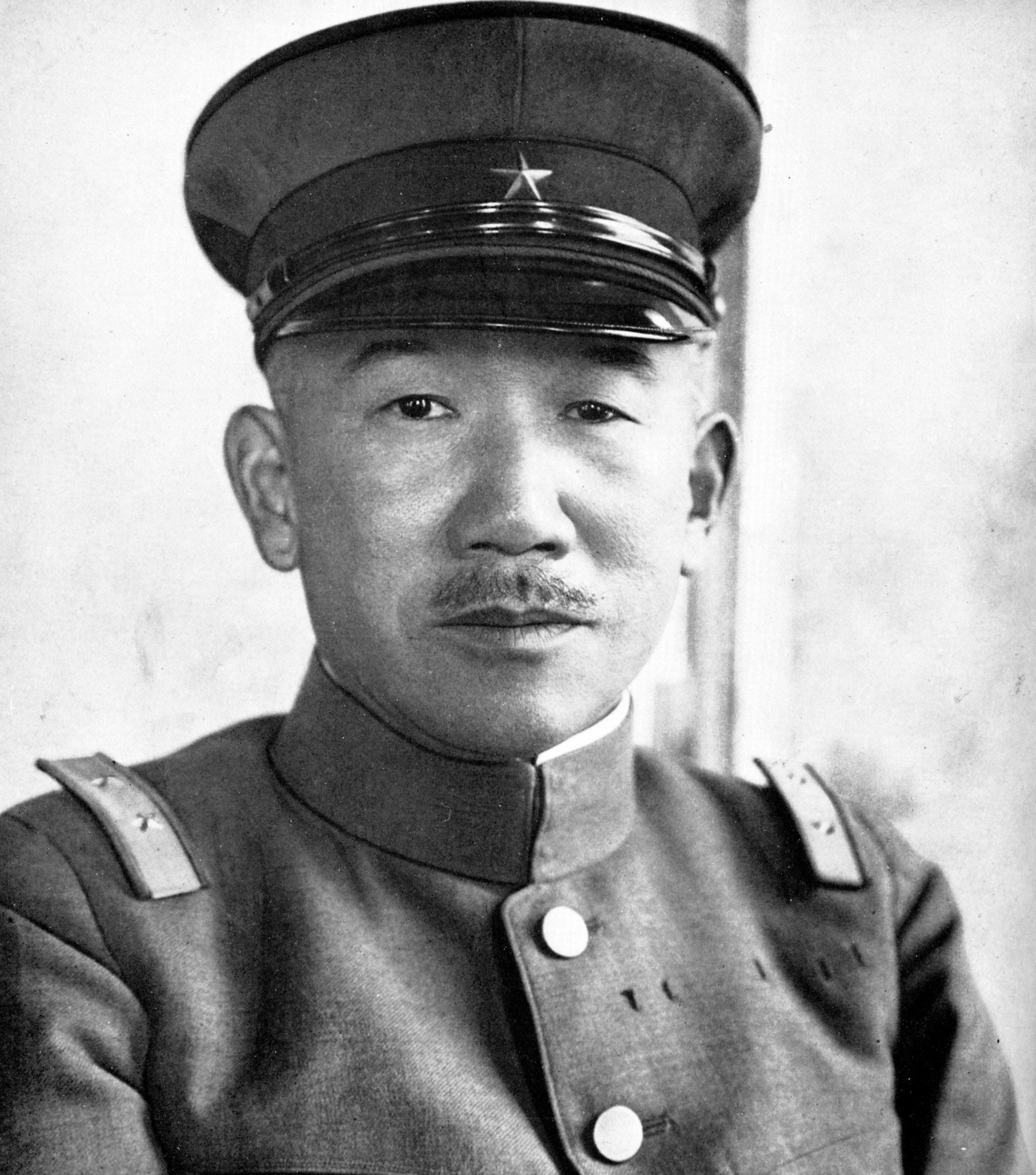
- Born: September 28, 1884; Nantan, Kyoto, Japan
- Died: November 24, 1973 (aged 89); Tokyo, Japan
- Military career
- Allegiance: Empire of Japan
- Branch: Imperial Japanese Army
- Service years: 1905 – 1945
- Rank: General
- Unit: 38 Infantry Regiment
- Commands: 26th Division; Fourth Army; Southern China Area Army; Third Area Army
- Conflicts: Russo-Japanese War; Siberian Intervention; Second Sino-Japanese War; World War II
- Awards: Order of the Sacred Treasures (1st class); Order of the Golden Kite (2nd class); Order of the Rising Sun (1st class)

Jun Ushiroku (後宮 淳, Ushiroku Jun; 28 September 1884 – 24 November 1973) was a general in the Imperial Japanese Army.

== Biography ==
Born in what is now part of the city of Nantan, Kyoto Prefecture, as the fourth son of a farmer, Ushiroku attended military preparatory schools in Osaka, and graduated from the 17th class of the Imperial Japanese Army Academy in 1905. He served in combat very briefly at the very end of the Russo-Japanese War as a junior lieutenant with the IJA 38th Infantry Regiment. He graduated from the 29th class of the Army Staff College in 1917. He served on staff of the Kwantung Army, staff of the IJA 3rd Division, staff of the IJA 5th Division, Railway Section of the Imperial Japanese Army General Staff, military attaché to Europe, and back with the Kwantung Army in Manchukuo, where he was assigned to the protection of the South Manchurian Railway. In August 1931, became Chief of Staff of the IJA 4th Division.

Ushiroku was promoted to major general in March 1934 and was in charge of the Personnel Bureau of the General Staff from August 1935. Following the attempted coup d'etat by elements of the Imperial Japanese Army in the 1936 February 26 incident, he was ordered to report directly to Army Minister Hisaichi Terauchi to oversee the purge of rebel sympathizers from sensitive posts. Following the July 1937 Marco Polo Bridge Incident, he expressed his opposition to further expansion of the Army into China. However, in August 1937 he was promoted to lieutenant general and in October became commander of the IJA 26th Division. At the time, this was a garrison force to provide security for central Manchukuo and from July 4, 1938, it was attached to the Mongolia Garrison Army in Inner Mongolia.

In 1939, he was reassigned to command the IJA 4th Army, which was again a garrison force guarding the northern borders of Manchukuo. These assignments kept him sidelined in the Second Sino-Japanese War until October 1940, when he became commander of the Southern China Area Army, which was responsible for garrisoning Japanese-occupied Guangdong Province and controlling military operations in neighboring Guangxi Province. In December 1940, he was awarded the Grand Cordon of the Order of the Rising Sun. In July 1941, Ushiroku was promoted to chief of staff of the China Expeditionary Army. In August 1942, he was promoted to full general and withdrawn to Japan to command the Central District Army. This was a field army responsible for the defense of the Japanese home islands. He remained in this post until February 1944.

In February 1944, he was hand-picked by Prime Minister Hideki Tojo to serve as Vice Chief of the General Staff a member of the Supreme War Council, Inspector-General of Army Aviation and Chief of the Army Aeronautical Department within the Army Ministry, as he had been a close protégée of Tojo from his early days in the Army. In these roles, Ushiroku pushed for the use of suicide attacks by infantry to disable or destroy American armor due to Japan's inability to mass-produce effective anti-tank weapons by this stage of the war.

After the collapse of the Tojo cabinet following the loss of Saipan, Ushiroku returned to Manchukuo to take command of the Japanese Third Area Army to oppose the Soviet invasion. Although his forces were composed mostly of undertrained or overaged reservists with obsolete weapons, he refused orders to retreat, and launched a counterattack along the Mukden-Port Arthur railway, buying time to allow many Japanese civilians to flee. By 13 August 1945, his formations were largely shattered, and a mutiny by the Manchukuo Imperial Army at Shinkyō ended his attempts to regroup. He surrendered to the Soviet army on 21 August 1945. He spent more than a decade as an internee in the Soviet Union. Ushiroku returned to Japan on 26 December 1956.

Ushiroku served as Chairman of the Japan Veterans Association until his death in 1973. His grave is at the Tama Cemetery in Fuchu, Tokyo.

== Family ==
Ushiroku's elder brother, Shintaro Ushiroku (1873-1959) was a noted entrepreneur and industrialist in Taiwan. He started with a building materials manufacturing business and later founded a number of companies, including Toho Artificial Fiber, Taiwan Brick, Takasago Beer, Beitou Ceramics, and Taiwan Paper Mill. He was selected as an advisor to the Taiwan Governor-General's Council. After the war, he emigrated to Brazil. Ushiroku's eldest son, Torao Ushiroku (1914-1992), was a diplomat and ambassador extraordinary and plenipotentiary to the Republic of Korea.

== Footnotes ==
Military offices
Preceded by Rippei Ogisu	Commander of 26th Division; October 1937-August 1939	Succeeded by Shigenori Kuroda
Preceded by Kesago Nakajima	Commander of Fourth Army; August 1939-September 1940	Succeeded by Kohei Washizu
Preceded by Rikichi Andō	Commander of Japanese Southern China Area Army; October 1940-June 1941	Succeeded by None
Preceded by Seishirō Itagaki	Chief of Staff, China Expeditionary Army; July 1941-August 1942	Succeeded by Masakazu Kawabe
Preceded by Fujii Yoji	Commander of Central District Army; August 1942–February 1944	Succeeded by Shōjirō Iida
Preceded by Naozaburo Okabe	Commander of Third Area Army; August 1944–August 1945	Succeeded by None
