= Operation Ichi-Go =

1944 Japanese offensive during the Second Sino-Japanese War

- Part of the Second Sino-Japanese War of World War II
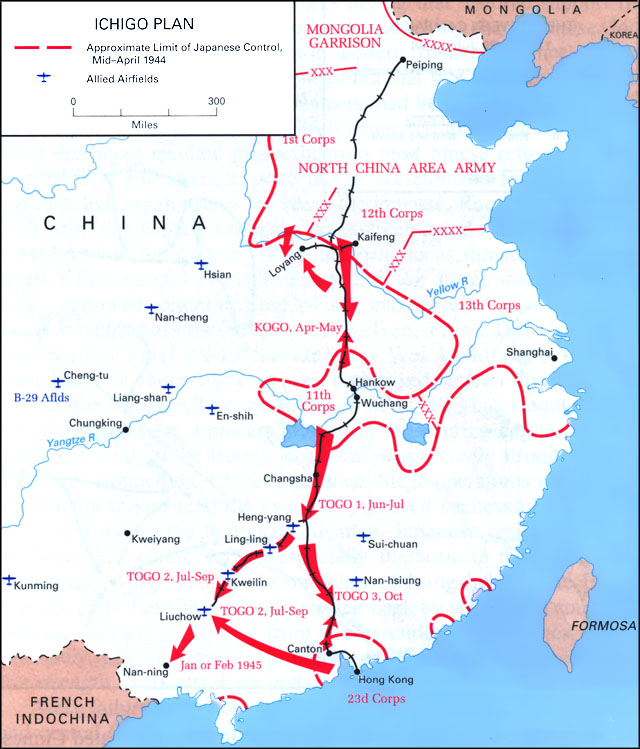
- Japanese plan for Operation Ichi-Go
Date	April 19 – December 31, 1944 (8 months, 1 week and 5 days)
Location	Provinces of Henan, Hunan and Guangxi in the Republic of China
Result	Japanese victory
Territorial changes	Japanese forces capture the cities of Luoyang, Changsha, Guilin, Hengyang, Liuzhou and Nanning; Establishment of a Japanese-occupied corridor from Central China Plain to French Indochina; Subsequent Japanese capture and destruction of key Allied airbases across southern China

Belligerents
Japan	China; United States

Commanders and leaders
Hirohito (Empire of Japan) Hideki Tojo (Empire of Japan) Yoshijirō Umezu (Empire of Japan) Shunroku Hata (Empire of Japan) Yasuji Okamura (Empire of Japan) Isamu Yokoyama (Empire of Japan) Hisakazu Tanaka	Chiang Kai-shek; He Yingqin; Chen Cheng (Republic of China (1912–1949)) Jiang Dingwen (Republic of China (1912–1949)) Tang Enbo (Republic of China (1912–1949)) Hu Zongnan (Republic of China (1912–1949)) Xue Yue (Republic of China (1912–1949)) Bai Chongxi (Republic of China (1912–1949)) Zhang Fakui (United States) Joseph Stilwell (United States) Albert C. Wedemeyer

Strength
Japanese record: In the Henan battlefield 148,000 troops 33,000 horses 269 artillery pieces 691 tanks 6,100 vehicles In the Hunan-Guangxi battlefield 362,000 troops 67,000 horses 1,282 artillery pieces 103 tanks 9,450 vehicles Total 510,000 troops 100,000 horses 1,551 artillery pieces 794 tanks 15,550 vehicles 200 bombers	Western Claim: 1,000,000 Chinese Claim: In the Henan battlefield: 300,000 troops In the Hunan battlefield: 286,000 troops In the Guangxi battlefield: at least 100,000 troops (Note: Including units totalling at least 47,500 troops which had fought in the Hunan battlefield)

Casualties and losses
100,000 combat and non-combat deaths heavy materiel losses	Western Claim: 500,000–600,000 casualties (according to "China's Bitter Victory: War with Japan, 1937-45"); Armies totalling 750,000 'destroyed' or put out of action according to Cox 130,000 killed in action Chinese Claims: According to the Ministry of Military Affairs for the Chinese Army in 1944 : Statistics compiled in 1944 : 124,893 killed 181,312 wounded 60,149 missing 366,354 total combat casualties; Post-war statistics : 102,719 killed 103,596 wounded 4,419 missing 210,734 total combat casualties 1,771,618 other losses (Note: Deaths from illnesses, reorganizations, and desertions)

Operation Ichi-Go (Japanese: 一号作戦, romanized: Ichi-gō Sakusen, lit. 'Operation Number One') was a campaign with several battles between the Imperial Japanese Army forces and the National Revolutionary Army of the Republic of China, fought from April to December 1944. It consisted of three battles in the Chinese provinces of Henan, Hunan and Guangxi.

These battles were the Japanese Operation Kogo or Battle of Central Henan, Operation Togo 1 or the Battle of Changheng, and Operation Togo 2 and Togo 3, or the Battle of Guilin–Liuzhou, respectively. The two primary goals of Ichi-Go were to open a land route to French Indochina, and capture air bases in southeast China from which American bombers were attacking the Japanese homeland and shipping.

In Japanese the operation was also called Tairiku Datsū Sakusen (大陸打通作戦), or "Continent Cross-Through Operation", while the Chinese refer to it as the Battle of Henan-Hunan-Guangxi (simplified Chinese: 豫湘桂会战; traditional Chinese: 豫湘桂會戰; pinyin: Yù Xīang Guì Huìzhàn).

== Background ==
=== Japanese planning ===
By early 1944, Allied victories in the Pacific were eroding the Japanese defensive perimeter. Japan decided to attack in Burma and China to improve its position; these became Operation U-Go and Ichi-Go respectively. Ichi-Go corresponded with an Imperial General Staff contingency plan to the loss of the Western Pacific; the plan was for securing an overland rail route through French Indochina and China for raw materials from south-east Asia, which would be used to develop offensives in 1946. The objective for Ichi-Go approved by Emperor Hirohito on 24 January 1944 was the neutralization of USAF bases in China, particularly the XX Bomber Command bases near Chengdu, Sichuan. China Expeditionary Army (CEA), commanded by General Shunroku Hata, expanded the objectives in its operational planning to include securing overland routes and neutralizing China by destroying Chinese forces. Ichi-Go may also have been intended to force the Allies to open peace negotiations, and give Japan a better negotiating position. General Yasuji Okamura was placed in charge of Ichi-Go.

By early February, preparations along the Yangtze included repairs to a major bridge and air field maintenance.

The IJA mobilized 500,000 troops, 100,000 horses, 1,500 pieces of artillery, 800 tanks, 15,000 mechanised vehicles, and 200 bombers for the offensive. They were supplied with eight months of fuel and two years of ammunition. According to historian Hara Takeshi, it was "the largest military operation carried out in the history of the Japanese army".

=== Chinese planning ===
The Chinese economy started collapsing in 1941. China entered the war in 1937 — albeit with a primarily agrarian economy, and quickly lost much of its industrial capacity to the Japanese. Maintaining the forces needed to stay in the war imposed an unsustainable burden on an economy further weakened by blockade, shortages of staple goods, poor weather, and inflation; there was widespread famine from 1942. The government responded to the economic pressure, reduced Japanese activity after December 1941, and the lack of offensive capability by encouraging the military to produce its own food. Some troops went further by entering industry and smuggling. The self-sufficiency drive and the lack of military action reduced military preparedness and increased corruption. By Ichi-Go, the effectiveness of the Chinese military had "plummeted".

Allied strategy affected Chinese preparations. At the Cairo Conference in November 1943, China agreed to major combined operations in Burma on the condition that the Western Allies committed significant resources. No such commitment occurred. A few days later at the Tehran Conference, the Western Allies and the Soviet Union agreed to prioritize the European theater. In January 1944, Chiang warned US President Franklin D. Roosevelt that prioritizing Europe would encourage Japan to attack and knock China out of the war. In late-March, China believed a Japanese offensive was "imminent"; the US received corroborating reports from Clarence E. Gauss, the American ambassador to China. China sought to reinforce the defense with Yunnan-based Y Force, which was earmarked for Burma; Y Force was an American trained and equipped National Revolutionary Army (NRA) unit and some of the best troops available to China. In early April, the US threatened to halt Lend-Lease to China if Y Force was withheld from Stilwell in Burma. Ultimately, Y Force joined the Allied campaign in Burma in mid-May as Ichi-Go was underway.

Chinese intelligence also misassessed indicators. It estimated that the Yangtze bridge would not be usable until May, and that Japanese troop movements in the north were a feint. On 27 April, after the start of Ichi-Go, China received French intelligence from Indochina of the Japanese goal of securing the rail corridor. The intelligence was disregarded as Japanese misinformation to draw forces away from Burma. The Chinese could not independently verify significant Japanese movements in central and southern China. Only 30,000 Japanese troops were detected operating in the north, which suggested a localized effort. The Chinese expected a larger attack in southern China, a belief that persisted into May.

== Campaign ==
=== Henan ===
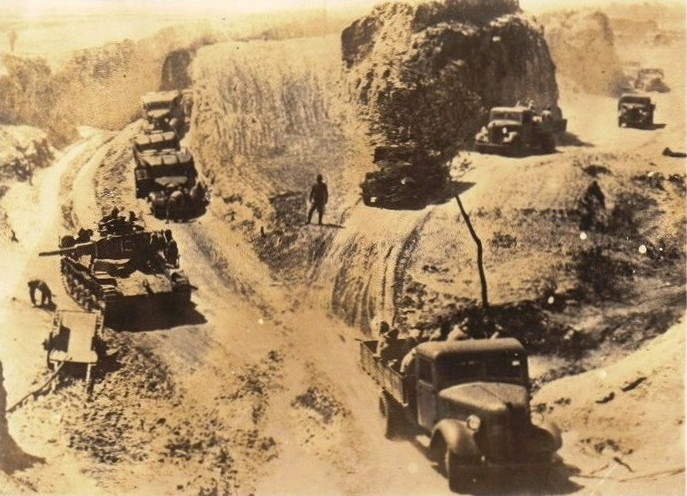
Japanese mechanized forces advancing towards Luoyang

The first phase of Ichi-Go, codenamed Kogo, was for capturing the Beijing–Hankou railway in Henan and destroying the ROC's First War Zone. Kogo involved 60,000–70,000 Japanese troops. The First War Zone was commanded by General Jiang Dingwen with General Tang Enbo as deputy. It had only 6,000-7,000 troops, or 60% to 70% of its authorized strength. USAF General Claire Chennault described the troops as a "poorly disciplined mob". Overall, there were 400,000 Chinese troops in northern China.

Kogo opened on 17 April, broke through the defenses by the end of the 18 April, and took Xuchang a week later. Divisional commander Lu Gongliang (呂公良), deputy divisional commander Huang Yonghuai (黃永淮), and two regimental commanders were all killed the day Xuchang fell on 1 May and none of the officers of the divisional headquarters was found after the defenders broke out from the city. Tang Enbo reported the casualties of the New 29th Division - fighting in central Henan and Xuchang - as 4,092 killed, wounded, or missing. Senshi Sōsho, the official Japanese military history, put Chinese losses at 2,432 killed and 858 captured and Japanese losses at 50 killed and 149 wounded.

Chinese communications were poor and the defense of Luoyang was uncoordinated. Chiang intended to allow the Japanese to close around Luoyang - the city was fortified and contained provisions for weeks - and then attack the flanks once the Japanese became overextended; this tactic had been used successfully before to defend Changsha. According to Jiang, he requested permission to attack as early as 23 and 24 April, but did not receive Chiang's permission until 1 May; by that time the Japanese had advanced too far. Poor communications also hampered the direction of reinforcements to Luoyang. The Japanese encircled Luoyang on 14 May and captured the city on 25 May. The Chinese lost more than 19,000 troops killed, wounded, or missing from the three divisions defending the city. On 26 May, the Japanese Army reported Chinese casualties as 4,386 killed and 6,230 captured, and Japanese casualties as 80 killed and 281 wounded.

At the same time as the battle of Luoyang, Chinese 36th Army Group retreated and its commander, Lieutenant general Li Jiayu, was killed. The Japanese pursued Tang's westward retreat as far as the Tong Pass. Combined with an advance north from Wuhan, the Japanese captured the railway.

Contemporary Chinese analysis identified additional factors for the collapse of the First War Zone, some of which were related to the general degeneration of the Chinese military. According to one critic, Tang's command and control was poor and he abandoned his army; Tang was generally seen to have been in effective control of the First War Zone. The local population - alienated by wartime deprivation, state corruption, and the First War Zone's aggressive requisitions - also withheld support. Incidents included civilians attacking Chinese troops, stealing abandoned weapons, and refusing to obey orders to destroy highways. According to American reports, Kogo met only "token resistance". Theodore H. White observed Chinese officers neglecting their duties and that within three weeks "a Chinese army of 300,000 men had ceased to exist".

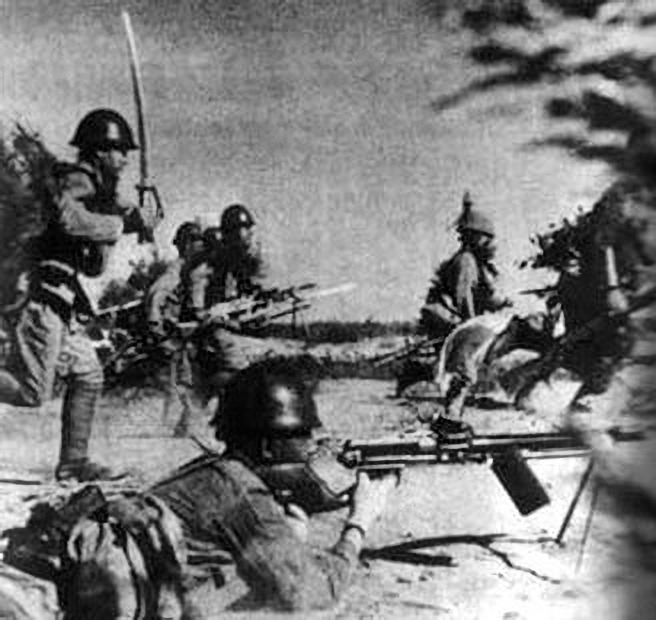
Imperial Japanese Army invading Henan, in 1944

The First War Zone suffered heavy casualties in the battle for central Henan. Deputy commander-in-chief Tang Enbo reported the losses of the 28th and 31st Army Groups alone as 58,036 killed, wounded, or missing. Combined with the losses of other regular Chinese units in major battles in Henan, the total casualties of the First War Zone are as high as 100,000. Senshi Sōsho put Chinese losses from the start of the operation until the capture of Luoyang at approximately 37,500 killed and approximately 15,000 captured and Japanese losses in the same period at approximately 850 killed and approximately 2,500 wounded.

On June 11, Lieutenant General Hikosaburō Hata, deputy chief of staff of the Imperial General Headquarters, arrived in Zhengzhou from Central China and received a report from Lieutenant General Eitaro Uchiyama, commander of the Twelfth Army, regarding the general progress of the Beijing–Hankou operation. On June 15, Lieutenant General Hata returned to Tokyo and reported to the Imperial General Headquarters that :

- Of the forty-three Chinese divisions deployed in the Beijing–Hankou operation, 60% suffered devastating losses and only 15% remaining unscathed. The First War Zone suffered severe material and morale damage and was estimated to be unable to recover before the end of the year.
- During the Beijing–Hankou operation, the Chinese Air Force flew approximately 400 sorties while the Japanese Air Force flew 2,700 sorties, approximately seven times that of the Chinese's.
- The number of Japanese soldiers killed in action accounted for one percent of the participating forces, the number of wounded accounted for three percent, and the number of those who fell ill accounted for five percent.
- Of the 255 tanks from the 3rd Tank Division that participated in the operation, one-third were no longer operational. Only nine tanks were destroyed—seven from landmines and two from artillery. Repairs would likely take a considerable amount of time.
- A regiment of the 37th Division advanced 500 kilometers in 20 days, averaging 27 kilometers per day.

=== Shaanxi ===
To support the Twelfth Army's operation in Henan, the Japanese First Army in Shanxi crossed the Yellow River near Yuanqu on May 9 and captured Shan County and Daying in Shaanxi on May 18. Given the concentration of retreating troops of the Chinese First War Zone and reinforcements from Hu Zongnan's Eighth War Zone, the First Army considered the possibility of a Chinese counterattack on Shan County and other areas, deeming it necessary to strike first to seize the initiative. Upon learning of the First Army's operational plan and discussing with the commander of the First Army, General Yasuji Okamura, commander of the North China Area Army, approved of the offensive operation and transferred units of the Twelfth Army such as the 3rd Tank Division with a one-week deadline for their return. On June 1, the Chinese Army under Hu Zongnan launched its offensive towards Shan County. Despite inflicting heavy casualties on certain units of the Japanese 69th Division, the attack ultimately stalled after three days. On June 5, the Japanese Army launched its offensive towards Lingbao but it did not proceed as expected with slow progress and heavy losses due to unexpected strong Chinese resistance. The First Army lost contact with its units and for some time was unaware of the battlefield situation. As the deadline on June 10 approached, the First Army was anxious and mobilized the reserve force in Nancun. At the same time, the Chinese defenses were showing signs of breaking and some units began retreating without orders. By midnight, the Chinese Army was ordered to retreat and the Japanese Army gave chase on June 11 with its tank division. Having achieved its operational objective of defeating the eastward-advancing troops of the Eighth War Zone, the Japanese Army ordered a withdrawal on June 12, swiftly restoring their original positions.

=== Hunan ===
The next phase was Togo 1 with the objective of securing the Guangzhou–Hankou railway from Wuhan to Hengyang. Togo 1 started on 27 May and involved 200,000 Japanese troops advancing south from Wuhan to Changsha. Central China was defended by another 400,000 troops. The ROC's Ninth War Zone, commanded by General Xue Yue, defended Changsha; it had held the city against three Japanese campaigns from 1939 to 1942; as in those engagements, Ninth War Zone strategy was a fighting withdrawal to the city combined with scorched earth. Togo 1 was much larger than the previous campaigns, advancing in three - rather than one - columns over a 150 kilometer-wide front; it was also adequately supplied. On 29 May, the ROC Military Affairs Commission ordered Changsha to be held to defend USAF air bases and maintain American confidence; the option of abandoning railway and retreating south-east to Guilin was rejected. Chiang refused to send supplies to Changsha because he believed Xue was disloyal.

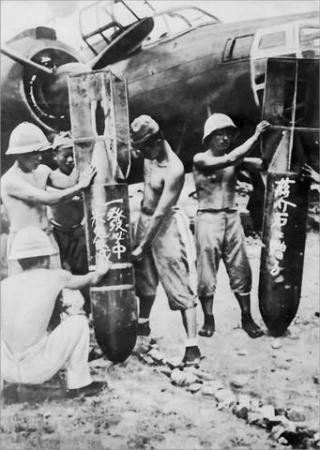
Japanese ground crew arming a Mitsubishi G4M with Bombs for Chiang Kai-shek

The Japanese reached Changsha in early June. The city was defended by three understrength Chinese divisions commanded by General Zhang Deneng; two of the divisions and the artillery were on Yuelu Mountain south of the city across the Xiang River. Unlike the previous campaigns, it was the Chinese who were outnumbered with 10,000 troops against 30,000 Japanese. One of the two attacking Japanese divisions had urban warfare training. Japanese bombers attacked the artillery on Yuelu, while infantry moved around the city to attack from the south. Zhang's redeployment of troops from the city to reinforce Yuelu disorganized the defense; Chinese staff officers were unable to organize movement over the Xiang, leaving many units "stranded", and unclear orders made many troops believe that they were to retreat. The Japanese took Changsha on 18 June after three days of fighting. The Chinese withdrew from Yuelu the same day leaving two companies in the city.

Xue retreated south to Hengyang. The city was defended by 18,000 troops. USAF Fourteenth Air Force, commanded by Chennault, provided limited support; it was also tasked with protecting USAF XX Bomber Command's bases and supporting the Allied Burma offensive. The defenses included concrete fortifications, and was well provisioned with artillery, anti-tank guns, and supplies. Two large reserve groups were placed to threaten the Japanese flanks. Chiang assigned General Fang Xianjue, whom he trusted, to command the city, A relief force from Guangdong was organized. On 25 June, the Japanese captured a major nearby US air base. Afterwards, the Japanese 68th and 116th Division attacked Hengyang from the west and south. The flooded paddy fields and canals to the west made the use of tanks difficult. To the south were hills. The attack was halted with heavy casualties on both sides. The Japanese paused to reinforce their air forces and resupply. On 11 July, after five days of heavy fighting, the Chinese fell back to another line. The Japanese paused again to bring up reinforcements of one division and several brigades. The Japanese sought to destroy Chinese reserves to reduce the defenders' morale. Air attack destroyed much of the city. By the end of July, there was a food shortage in Hengyang. Chiang did not resupply the city. Stilwell - who controlled Lend-Lease in the Chinese theater - refused Chennault's request to divert 1,000 tons of supplies to Hengyang; according to the United States Army's official history, Stilwell believed that Chinese politics would prevent the supplies from being used against the Japanese. Five Japanese divisions resumed the attack on 3 August, broke through the northern wall on 7 August, and captured the city by the morning of 8 August.

Theodore White observed that the Chinese Army tasked with relieving Hengyang did not take advantage of their numerical superiority to launch one concentrated assault on the Japanese Army. Instead, under the direct command of the Nationalist government which managed the exact actions of the relief force, the Chinese Army attacked in piecemeal assaults and reinforcements were only used to replace losses.

=== Guangxi and Guizhou ===
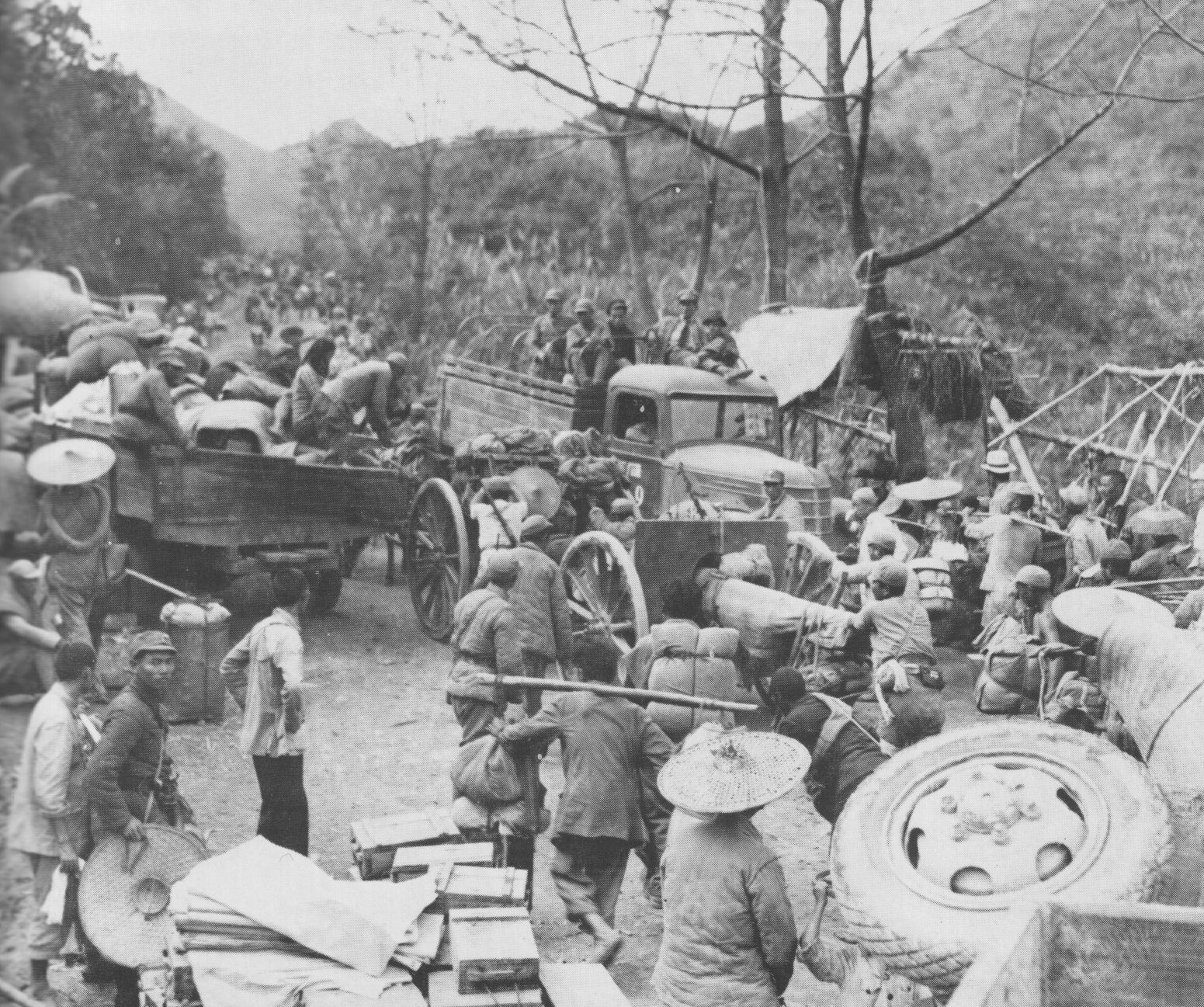
Chinese forces evacuate Liuzhou in November 1944, Japanese forces then entered the city and captured the US airbase there

Japanese forces entered Guangxi in early September 1944 and quickly captured US air bases at Guilin, Liuzhou, and Nanning. The 170,000 Nationalist troops defending northern Guangxi were largely unwilling to fight and units disintegrated. Leaders of the Guangxi Clique like General Bai Chongxi decided that neither Guilin nor Liuzhou could be successfully defended and Chinese forces abandoned those cities.

In late November 1944, the Japanese advance slowed approximately 300 miles (480 km) from Chongqing as it experienced shortages of trained soldiers and materiel. Although Operation Ichi-Go achieved its goals of seizing US air bases and establishing a potential railway corridor from Manchukuo to Hanoi, it did so too late to impact the result of the broader war. American bombers in Chengdu were moved to the Mariana Islands where, along with bombers already at the bases on Saipan and Tinian, they could still bomb the Japanese home islands. The Japanese also failed to destroy the British and Australian Commando operation, 'Mission 204' which had been working with the Chinese. Before the US bases were overrun, the mission had left China and returned to Burma.

Toward the end of Ichi-Go, ROC 8th War Zone in Guizhou − with five armies and used to contain the Chinese Communists − was redeployed to fight the Japanese. Overextended supply lines and mounting casualties caused the Japanese to end Ichi-Go.

=== Supporting fronts ===
In June 1944, the 70th Division of the Japanese Thirteenth Army launched an offensive towards Quzhou in Zhejiang province, capturing the city on June 26. Yu Pifu, the commander of the 78th Regiment of the 26th Division, was killed in action defending Quzhou. On July 2, the 70th Division returned to Jinhua and the operation ended. In this battle, the Chinese Third War Zone suffered more than 2,600 killed or wounded and more than 700 missing. The 70th Division suffered 170 killed and 555 wounded including the death of Major General Takehiko Yokoyama, commander of the 62nd Infantry Brigade, who was killed in action while overlooking the Shizi Mountain battlefield on June 11, 1944, the same day brigade commander Major General Chiyota Motomura was recorded as killed in action in the battle of Lingbao.

== Aftermath ==
According to Cox, China suffered 750,000 casualties, including soldiers who simply "melted away" and those rendered combat ineffective besides being killed or captured.

After the battle of central Henan, Chiang convened with his generals in a series of meetings starting from the 21st of July that would be known as the Huangshan Conference (黃山整軍會議). In the meetings, Chiang gave several speeches regarding the performance of the First Military Front in the battle. He assessed that there were too many vacancies in each unit in the army, reducing their fighting capabilities and requiring the Chinese army to outnumber the Japanese army by 6 or 7 to 1. He ordered He Yingqin to verify that each division was at full strength and that the sick and wounded should be eliminated, reducing the army from 6.5 million in 321 divisions to 5 million in 200 divisions.

In November 1944, He Yingqin resigned as the Ministry of Military Affairs and Chen Cheng took over his position. There were still 5.9 million troops by then, with a reduction of 600,000 personnel. Since the goal of reducing the army to 5 million men had not been achieved, Chen Cheng pushed for further reforms in the army. From January until March 1945, Chen Cheng worked to eliminate the unneeded and reduce the amount of vacancies in the army, removing 1 million from the establishment and reducing the army to 4.9 million military personnel. By the end of the war, Chen Cheng had reduced the army to 4.3 million personnel, but further reorganization was interrupted due to Chiang's insistence on incorporating the surrendered puppet soldiers into the National Revolutionary Army.

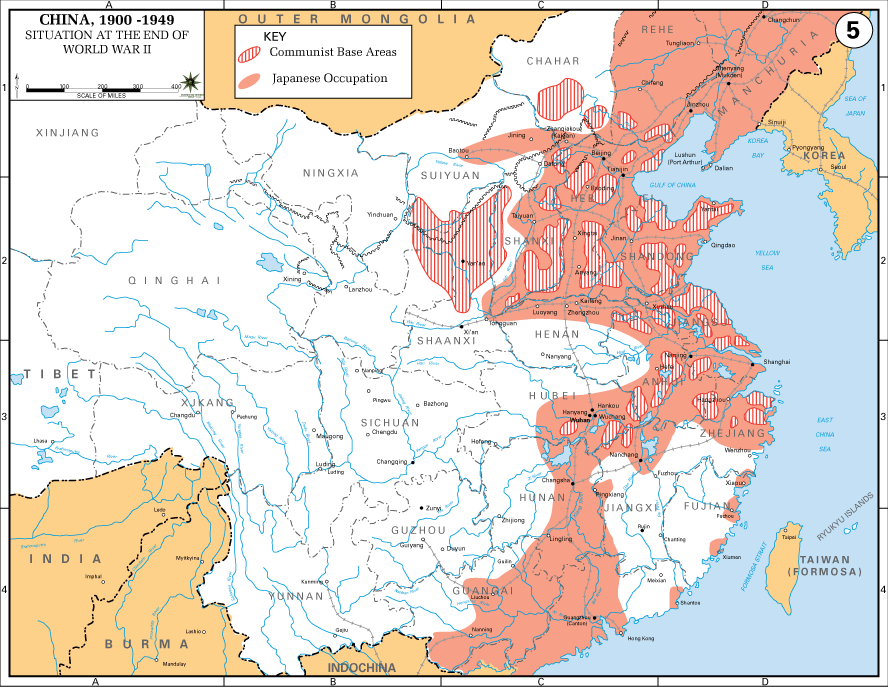
Japanese occupation (red) of eastern China near the end of the war, and Communist guerrilla bases (striped)

The poor performance of Chiang's forces in opposing the Japanese advance became widely viewed as demonstrating Chiang's incompetence. The campaign further weakened the Nationalist economy and government revenues. Throughout the war, but especially after the Ichi-Go campaign, the Nationalist government could not pay its bills. Because of the Nationalists' increasing inability to fund the military, Nationalist authorities overlooked military corruption and smuggling. The Nationalist army increasingly turned to raiding villages to press-gang peasants into service and force marching them to assigned units.

With the rapid deterioration of the Nationalist forces, Stilwell saw Operation Ichi-Go as an opportunity to win his political struggle against Chiang and gain full command of all Chinese armed forces. He was able to convince General George Marshall to have President Roosevelt send an ultimatum to Chiang threatening to end all American aid unless Chiang "at once" placed Stilwell "in unrestricted command of all your forces".

Stilwell immediately delivered this letter to Chiang despite pleas from Patrick Hurley, Roosevelt's special envoy in China, to delay delivering the message and work on a deal that would achieve Stilwell's aim in a manner more acceptable to Chiang. Seeing this act as a move toward the complete subjugation of China, a defiant Chiang gave a formal reply in which he said that Stilwell must be replaced immediately and he would welcome any other qualified US general to fill Stilwell's position. In Chiang's view, Stillwell had moved too many Chinese forces into the Burma campaign, leaving China insufficiently protected. Stilwell was replaced as Chief of Staff to Chiang and commander of the US Forces, China Theater (USFCT) by Major General Albert Wedemeyer. Stilwell's other command responsibilities in the China Burma India Theater were divided up and allocated to other officers.

Although Chiang was successful in removing Stilwell, the public relations damage suffered by his Nationalist regime was irreparable. Right before Stilwell's departure, New York Times war correspondent Brooks Atkinson interviewed him in Chongqing and wrote:

The decision to relieve General Stilwell represents the political triumph of a moribund, anti-democratic regime that is more concerned with maintaining its political supremacy than in driving the Japanese out of China. The Chinese Communists... have good armies that they are claiming to be fighting guerrilla warfare against the Japanese in North China—actually they are covertly or even overtly building themselves up to fight Generalissimo's government forces... The Generalissimo [Chiang Kai-shek] naturally regards these armies as the chief threat to the country and his supremacy... has seen no need to make sincere attempt to arrange at least a truce with them for the duration of the war... No diplomatic genius could have overcome the Generalissimo's basic unwillingness to risk his armies in battle with the Japanese.

Atkinson, who had visited Mao Zedong in the communist capital of Yenan, saw his Communist Chinese forces as more disciplined and rooted in popular support (after Atkinson visited Mao, his article on his visit was titled Yenan: A Chinese Wonderland City), and the Nationalists in turn as hopelessly reactionary and corrupt. This view was shared by many U.S. journalists in China at the time, but due to pro-Chiang Allied press censorship, it was not as well known to their readers until Stilwell's recall and the ensuing anti-Chiang coverage forced it into the open.

The Japanese successes in Operation Ichi-Go had a limited effect on the war. The US could still bomb the Japanese homeland from Pacific bases. In the territories seized, Japanese forces controlled only the cities, not their surrounding countryside. The increased size of the occupied territory also thinned out the Japanese lines. A great majority of the Chinese forces were able to retreat out of the area, and later come back to attack Japanese positions. As a result, future Japanese attempts to fight into Sichuan, such as in the Battle of West Hunan, ended in failure. All in all, Japan was not any closer to defeating China after this operation, and the constant defeats the Japanese suffered in the Pacific and Burma meant that Japan never got the time and resources needed to achieve final victory over China. The Japanese suffered 11,742 killed in action by mid-November, and the number of soldiers that died of illness was more than twice this. The total death toll was about 100,000 by the end of 1944.

Operation Ichi-Go created a great sense of social confusion in the areas of China that it affected. Chinese Communist guerrillas were able to exploit this confusion to gain influence and control of greater areas of the countryside in the aftermath of Ichi-Go. This along with the aforementioned rapid deterioration of the Nationalist forces, Nationalist unpopularity both internally and abroad, Communist popularity both internally and externally, Kuomintang corruption and other factors allowed the Communists to gain victory in the resumed Chinese Civil War after World War II. Historian Hans van de Ven argues that the impact Ichi-Go had on the political situation in China was as important to the post-war world order as Operation Overlord and Operation Bagration were in Europe.

In the spring of 1945, the United States agreed to train and equip 36 Chinese divisions. Chiang also wanted to withdraw some of his troops from Burma to fight within China. China began planning a counter-offensive for fall of 1945, called "White Tower" and "Iceman", to recapture the coastal ports in south-west China as routes for Allied aid.

== In popular culture ==
The 1958 novel The Mountain Road, by Theodore White, a Time magazine correspondent in China at the time of the offensive, was based on an interview with former OSS Major Frank Gleason, who led a demolition group of American soldiers during the offensive that were charged with blowing up anything left behind in the retreat that might be of use to Japan. His group ultimately destroyed over 150 bridges and 50,000 tons of munitions, helping slow the Japanese advance. In 1960, it was adapted into a film by the same name starring James Stewart and Lisa Lu, noteworthy for being one of Stewart's few war films and the only one in which he plays a soldier, as he opposed war films because of their inaccuracy. It is generally believed he made an exception for this film because it was antiwar.

Theodore White said that during Ichigo, the majority of land labelled as Japanese occupied on maps were majority occupied by communists and they fought and administered and collected taxes in the territories and by the middle of 1944 they had 18 "liberated regions" behind Japanese front lines .

In occupied areas, Japan only controlled cities and big towns with railways and not the rural areas which were steadily taken over by communists.
