= Fifteenth Area Army =

- Active: February 1, 1945 - August 15, 1945
- Country: Empire of Japan
- Branch: Imperial Japanese Army
- Type: Infantry
- Role: Field Army
- Garrison/HQ: Osaka
- Nickname(s): 楠 (Kusu = "camphor")
- Engagements: Operation Downfall

The Fifteenth Area Army (第15方面軍, Dai jyūgo hōmen gun) was a field army of the Imperial Japanese Army during the closing stages of World War II.

== History ==
The Japanese 15th Area Army was formed on February 1, 1945 under the General Defense Command as part of the last desperate defense effort by the Empire of Japan to deter possible landings of Allied forces in central Honshū during Operation Downfall (or Operation Ketsugō (決号作戦, Ketsugō sakusen) in Japanese terminology). It was transferred to the newly formed Japanese Second General Army on April 8, 1945. The Japanese 15th Area Army was responsible for the Kansai and Chugoku regions of Honshū and the island of Shikoku. It was headquartered in Osaka. The 15th Area Army leadership also held equivalent posts in the Central District Army, and had the honor of receiving their appointments personally from Emperor Hirohito rather than the Imperial General Headquarters.

The 15th Area Army consisted mostly of poorly trained reservists, conscripted students and home guard militia. In addition, the Japanese had organized the Patriotic Citizens Fighting Corps — which included all healthy men aged 15–60 and women 17–40 — to perform combat support, and ultimately combat jobs. Weapons, training, and uniforms were generally lacking: some men were armed with nothing better than muzzle-loading muskets, longbows, or bamboo spears; nevertheless, they were expected to make do with what they had.

The 15th Area Army was demobilized at the surrender of Japan on August 15, 1945 without having seen combat.

== List of Commanders ==
=== Commanding officer ===
	Name	From	To
1	General Masakazu Kawabe	1 February 1945	7 April 1945
2	Lieutenant General Eitaro Uchiyama	7 April 1945	15 August 1945

=== Chief of Staff ===
	Name	From	To
1	Lieutenant General Michio Kunitake	1 February 1945	15 August 1945
