= U-Go =

U-GO may refer to:

- Ampol, fuel service brand
- Operation U-Go, World War II offensive
- U-Go Mobility - bus operator in Sydney, Australia
