= Fourth Army (Japan) =

Japanese Fourth Army
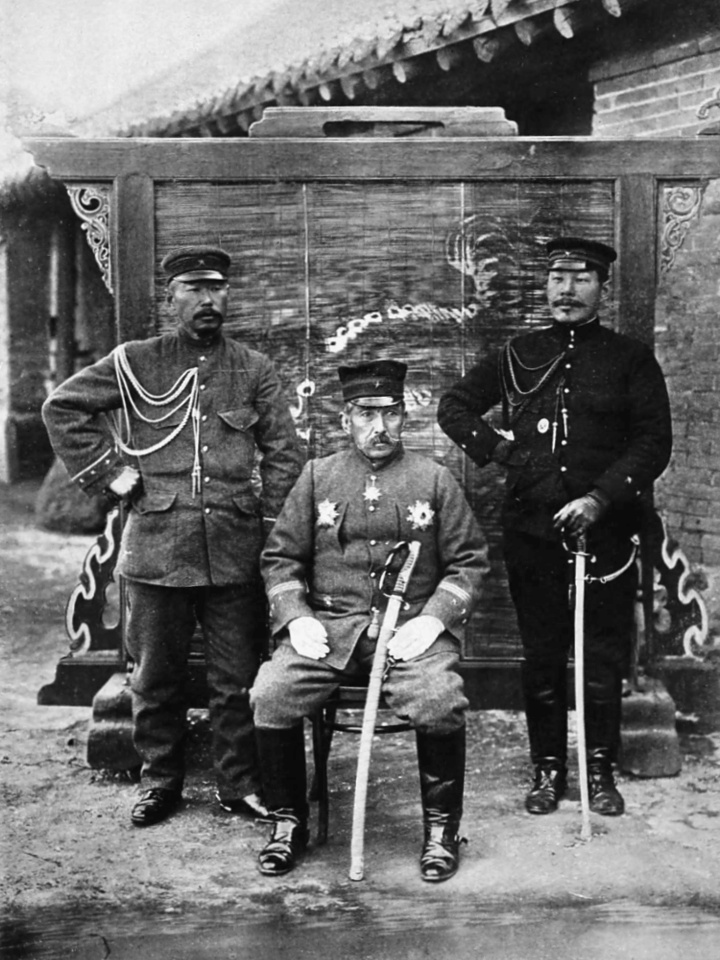
- The brain of the Fourth Army in 1905. From left: Uehara Yūsaku, Nozu Michitsura and Tachibana Koichirō.
- Active: June 24, 1904 - August 15, 1945
- Country: Empire of Japan
- Branch: Imperial Japanese Army
- Type: Infantry
- Role: Corps
- Garrison/HQ: Bei'an, Manchukuo
- Nicknames: Hikari (光, Light)
- Engagements: Russo-Japanese War; *Battle of Liaoyang; *Battle of Mukden; World War II; *Soviet invasion of Manchuria

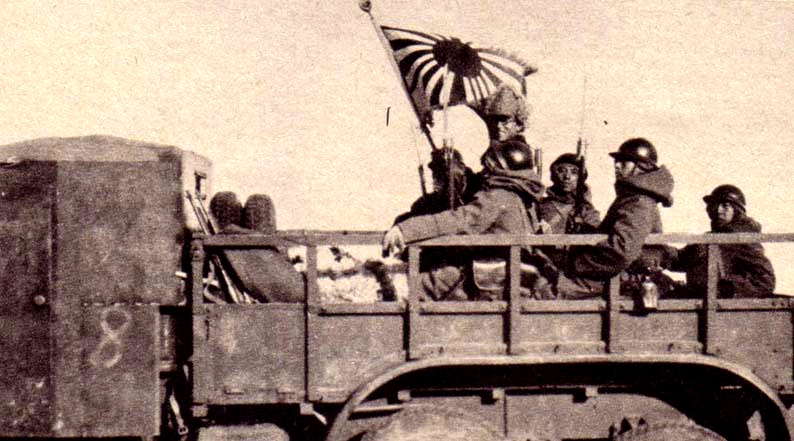
Japanese troops in Manchuria

The Japanese 4th Army (第4軍, Dai-yon gun) was an army of the Imperial Japanese Army based in Manchukuo from the Russo-Japanese War until the end of World War II.

== History ==
=== Russo-Japanese War ===
The Japanese 4th Army was initially raised on June 24, 1904, in the midst of the Russo-Japanese War under the command of General Nozu Michitsura out of various reserve elements, to provide support and additional manpower in the Japanese drive towards Mukden in the closing stages of the war against Imperial Russia. It was disbanded at Mukden on January 17, 1906, after the signing of the Treaty of Portsmouth and the end of the war.

=== Second Sino-Japanese War ===
After the start of the Second Sino-Japanese War, the Japanese Fourth Army was raised again as a garrison force to guard the northern borders of Manchukuo against possible incursions by the Soviet Red Army. It was based at Bei'an, the capital of a northern Manchukuo province of the same name, that was heavily fortified with various ground emplacements. The Fourth Army afterwards came under the operational command of the Japanese First Area Army under the overall command of the Kwantung Army. As the war situation in the southeast Asia and China fronts of World War II worsened against the Japanese, experienced men and equipment were siphoned off from the Fourth Army to reinforce other units, leaving it largely hollowed out by the start of 1945.

During the Soviet invasion of Manchuria in the final days of World War II, the Japanese Fourth Army was absolutely no match for the experienced, battle-hardened Soviet armored and mechanized infantry divisions, who quickly overran or circumvented the Japanese defenses, and its poorly equipped and poorly trained forces were driven back to Harbin by the time of the surrender of Japan. Many of its surviving troops became Japanese POWs in the Soviet Union.

== List of Commanders ==
=== Commanding officer ===
	Name	From	To
1	General Nozu Michitsura	30 June 1904	12 January 1906
X	Disbanded		
1	Lieutenant General Kesago Nakajima	15 July 1938	1 August 1939
2	Lieutenant General Jun Ushiroku	1 August 1939	28 September 1940
3	Lieutenant General Kohei Washizu	28 October 1940	15 October 1941
4	Lieutenant General Isamu Yokoyama	15 October 1941	21 September 1942
5	Lieutenant General Tatsumi Kusaba	21 September 1942	7 February 1944
6	Lieutenant General Kanji Nishihara	7 February 1944	23 March 1945
7	Lieutenant General Mikio Uemura	23 March 1945	September 1945

=== Chief of Staff ===
	Name	From	To
1	Major General Uehara Yusaku	30 June 1904	23 January 1906
X	Disbanded		
1	Lieutenant General Renya Mutaguchi	15 July 1938	1 December 1939
2	Lieutenant General Masao Yoshizumi	1 December 1939	9 September 1940
3	Lieutenant General Hiroshi Watanabe	9 September 1940	7 July 1941
4	Lieutenant General Asasaburo Kobayashi	7 July 1941	1 December 1941
5	Lieutenant General Hiroshi Watanabe	1 December 1941	1 August 1942
6	Lieutenant General Kohei Takeshi	1 August 1942	11 September 1943
7	Major General Saburo Hagi	11 September 1943	26 December 1944
8	Major General Bujo Ono	26 December 1944	September 1945
