= Asasaburo Kobayashi =

- 小林浅三郎
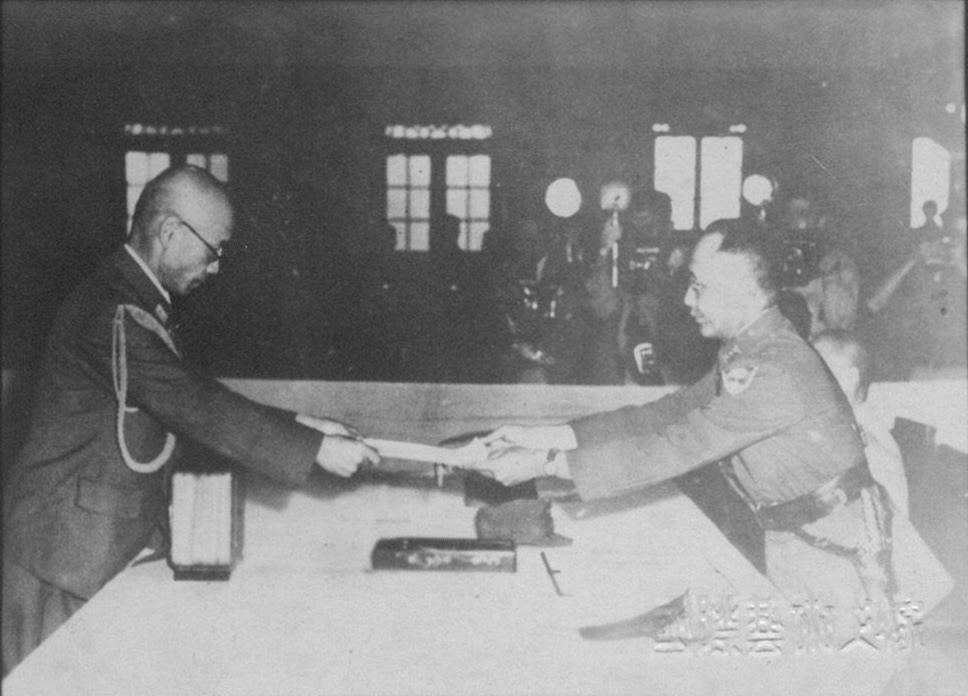
- Asasaburō Kobayashi presenting the Japanese Instrument of Surrender to general He Yingqin at Nanjing on 9 September 1945
- Born: 1 April 1891; Hyogo Prefecture, Japan
- Died: 7 March 1974 (aged 82)
- Military career
- Allegiance: Empire of Japan
- Branch: Imperial Japanese Army
- Rank: Lieutenant General
- Commands: 30th Division
- Conflicts: Second Sino-Japanese War; World War II

Asasaburo Kobayashi (小林浅三郎, Kobayashi Asasaburo; 1 April 1891 – 7 March 1974) was an Imperial Japanese Army lieutenant general during World War II who mostly served in staff positions.

== Biography ==
He was promoted to colonel on 1 August 1935, major general on 9 November 1938, and lieutenant general on 25 August 1941. In the early 1930s he was assigned to the Imperial Household and then became an instructor at the army infantry school in 1935. From 1936 to 1937, Kobayashi was the chief of staff of the Imperial Guards Division, then commanded the 3rd Infantry Regiment from 1937 to 1938. He became the chief of staff of 12th Army on 9 November 1938 and on 1 December 1939 was appointed as the chief of the 1st Section of the Inspectorate-General of Military Training on the Army General Staff. On 7 July 1941 Kobayashi became the chief of staff of 4th Army. Then from December 1941 to 1943, he served as the chief of staff of General Defense Command, overseeing military forces defending the Japanese home islands, Korea, and Taiwan, including during the Doolittle Raid. He briefly became the commander of 30th Division from 10 June 1943 to 28 March 1944 before returning to being the chief of staff of General Defense Command, which he held until February 1945. He then became the last chief of staff of the China Expeditionary Army until the end of the war in August 1945.
