= Central District Army =

- Active: 1940 to 1945
- Country: Empire of Japan
- Branch: Imperial Japanese Army
- Type: Infantry
- Role: Field Army
- Engagements: Operation Downfall

The Central District Army (中部軍, Chubu gun) was a field army of the Imperial Japanese Army responsible for the defense of the Japanese home islands during the Pacific War. It was one of the regional commands in the Japanese home islands reporting to the General Defense Command.

== Commanders ==
=== Commanding officer ===
	Name	From	To
1	Lieutenant General Kesago Nakajima	2 August 1937	26 August 1937
2	Lieutenant General Hasunuma Ban	26 August 1937	28 December 1937
3	Lieutenant General Hisao Tani	28 December 1937	1 August 1939
4	Lieutenant General Waichiro Sonobe	1 August 1939	9 March 1940
5	Lieutenant General Iwamatsu Yoshio	9 March 1940	20 June 1941
6	Lieutenant General Fujii Yoji	20 June 1941	17 August 1942
7	Lieutenant General Jun Ushiroku	17 August 1942	21 February 1944
8	Lieutenant General Shōjirō Iida	21 February 1944	1 December 1944
9	Lieutenant General Masakazu Kawabe	1 December 1944	1 February 1945

== See also ==
- Armies of the Imperial Japanese Army
