= Eitaro Uchiyama =

Japanese officer, war criminal (1893–1973)

Eitarō Uchiyama
- 内山 英太郎
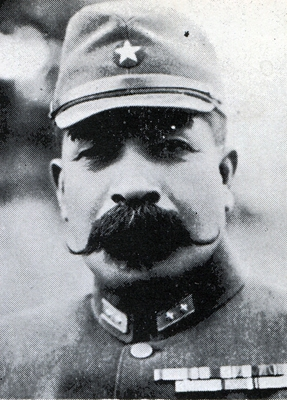
- Born: December 16, 1887; Tokyo, Japan
- Died: December 25, 1973 (aged 86); Japan
- Military career
- Allegiance: Empire of Japan
- Branch: Imperial Japanese Army
- Service years: 1909–1945
- Rank: Lieutenant General
- Conflicts: Second Sino-Japanese War; World War II

Eitarō Uchiyama (内山 英太郎, Uchiyama Eitarō; December 16, 1887 – December 25, 1973) was a lieutenant general in the Imperial Japanese Army during World War II.

== Biography ==
=== Early career ===
Uchiyama was born in Tokyo as the eldest son of General Uchiyama Kojirō, but was adopted and raised by his uncle. He attended military preparatory schools in Sendai and graduated from the 21st class of the Imperial Japanese Army Academy in 1909 with a speciality in artillery. He graduated from the 32nd class of the Army Staff College in 1920. During his early career, he served in a number of artillery units and became an artillery instructor in 1927.

From May 1930, he was sent for further studies in France. In August 1933, after his return to Japan, he was promoted to colonel and given command of the IJA 1st Field Artillery Regiment, and was later commandant of the Field Artillery School.

Uchiyama was promoted to major general in August 1937. He subsequently served as commander of the IJA 5th Field Artillery Brigade and the commander of artillery of the Kwantung Army.

=== World War II ===
In October 1939, Uchiyama was promoted to lieutenant general. From September 1940, he was assigned command of the 13th Division which was assigned to the Japanese Eleventh Army in China during the Second Sino-Japanese War, notably the Battle of Zaoyang–Yichang, Battle of West Hubei and Battle of Changde. A particularly heavy Chinese attacks in Yichang were repulsed in October 1941 with the extensive use of chemical weapons by 13th division.

On August 17, 1942, Uchiyama became commander of the IJA 3rd Army, which was based in Manchukuo as a garrison force to guard the eastern borders against possible incursions by the Soviet Red Army. It afterwards came under the command of the Japanese First Area Army in July 1942. From February 7, 1944 he was assigned command of the IJA12th Army, which was primarily a garrison force in Japanese-occupied northern China. This force was sent south into combat during Operation Ichi-Go and Uchiyama was distinguished in operations at the Battle of Central Henan.

In April 1945, Uchiyama was recalled to Japan, to take command of the Japanese Fifteenth Area Army. This organization was part of the last desperate defense effort by Japan to deter possible landings of Allied forces during Operation Downfall and was responsible for the Kansai and Chugoku regions of Honshū and the island of Shikoku. It was headquartered in Osaka. He entered the reserves in December 1945.

After the end of the war, Uchiyama was assigned to the central demobilization office. In June 1946, he was arrested by order of the U.S. military authorities and charged war crimes. In 1947, he was found guilty of command responsibility for allowing the execution of American airmen shot down between April and August 1945 in the region of Japan under control of the 15th Area Army. Uchiyama was sentenced to 30 years of hard labor at Sugamo Prison. He was paroled in April 1958, and died in 1973.
