= 33rd Division (Imperial Japanese Army) =

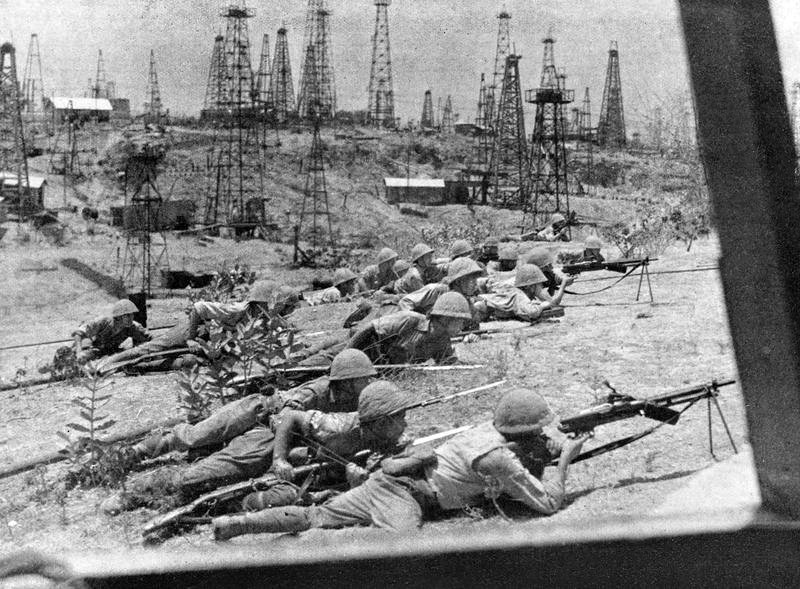
- Soldiers of the 33rd division occupying the oilfields at Yenangyaung, 1942
- Active: 1939–1944
- Country: Empire of Japan
- Branch: Imperial Japanese Army
- Type: Infantry
- Size: Division
- Garrison/HQ: Utsunomiya, Tochigi
- Nickname: Bow Division
- Engagements: Second Sino-Japanese War; First Battle of Changsha; Burma Campaign; Battle of Yenangyaung; Battle of Imphal; Battle of Sittang Bridge

Commanders
- Notable commanders: Shozo Sakurai

The 33rd Division (第33師団, Dai-sanjūsan Shidan) was an infantry division unit of the Imperial Japanese Army (IJA). Its call sign was the Bow Division (弓兵団, Yumi Heidan). The 33rd Division was raised in Utsunomiya, Tochigi prefecture, simultaneously with 32nd, 34th, 35th, 36th and 37th Divisions. Its headquarters were initially in Sendai. It was raised from conscripts largely from the northern Kantō prefectures of Tochigi, Ibaraki and Gunma.

== Action ==
Initially the 33rd division was assigned to the 11th army in central China and sent to Hubei. It saw combat at the First Battle of Changsha from 14 September 1939. In April 1941, the 33rd division was transferred to Shanxi, and its reconnaissance regiment was disbanded.

The 33rd division was transferred to the 15th army on 6 November 1941, and took part in the invasion of British Burma, under Lieutenant General Shozo Sakurai. Initially the 33rd division landed in Bangkok in January 1942 and proceeded inland. It lost a battalion at the Battle of Yenangyaung, but completed the conquest of Burma in May 1942 nonetheless. In December 1942, the 33rd division was instrumental in defeating Allied forces in the Arakan campaign.

=== Battle of Imphal ===
As the Burma Railway was officially completed on 25 October 1943, the Japanese command in Burma had been reorganized. A new headquarters, Burma Area Army, was created under Lieutenant General Masakasu Kawabe. One of its subordinate formations, responsible for the central part of the front facing British India in Nagaland and Assam, was the 15th army, whose new commander was Lieutenant General Renya Mutaguchi. At the same time, Lieutenant General Shozo Sakurai was promoted to command the 28th army in southern Burma. His command of the 33rd Division was succeeded by Lieutenant General Motoso Yanagida.

Renya Mutaguchi’s plan was to have the 33rd Division destroy the Indian 17th Infantry Division at Tedim, then attack Imphal from the south - an action known as Operation U-Go. The 33rd Division Infantry Group HQ, under Major General Tsunoru Yamamoto, formed the Yamamoto Force, composed of units of the Japanese 33rd and 15th Divisions, which would destroy the Indian 20th Infantry Division at Tamu, then attack Imphal from the east. Meanwhile, the 15th Division under Lieutenant General Masafumi Yamauchi would envelop Imphal from the north, while in a separate subsidiary operation, the 31st Division under Lieutenant General Kotoku Sato would isolate Imphal by capturing nearby Kohima. All Renya Mutaguchi's divisional commanders disagreed with the plan to some extent, and Motoso Yanagida openly derided him as an "imbecile".

In the opening stages of the Battle of Imphal, the 33rd Division cut off the Indian 17th Division under Major General Cowan. The Japanese 215th Regiment under Colonel Masahiko Sasahara captured a supply dump at Milestone 109, twenty miles behind Cowan's leading outposts. The Japanese 214th Regiment under Colonel Takanobu Sakuma seized Tongzang and a ridge named Tuitum Saddle across the only road, a few miles behind the Indian 17th Division's position. However, they were unable to dig in properly before they were hit by the Indian 48th Brigade on 18 March 1944, taking heavy casualties. Fighting around Milestone 109 was even more severe.

In early April 1944, the 33rd Division attacked from the south at Bishenpur, where they cut a secondary track from Silchar into the plain. Motoso Yanagida was already pessimistic and depressed by his failure to trap the Indian 17th Division. He had also been rattled by a garbled radio message which suggested that one of his regiments had been destroyed at Milestone 109. He, therefore, advanced cautiously. By doing so, he may have lost a chance to gain success as Bishenpur was held only by the Indian 32 Brigade (from 20th Division) and the Indian 17th Infantry Division was resting after its retreat. Renya Mutaguchi removed him from command.

In early May 1944, the British counter-attacked. None of the Japanese divisions had received adequate supplies since the offensive began (the Burma Railway was able to transfer only 400 ton supplies per day, out of 3000 ton per day nominal capacity), and some of the troops were starving; others were sick with malaria, and most were low on ammunition. Although there was now no realistic hope of success, Renya Mutaguchi (and his superior Masakasu Kawabe) ordered renewed attacks. The 33rd Division, reinforced in June 1944 by battalions from the 53rd and 54th Divisions and under a new forceful commander, Lieutenant-General Nobuo Tanaka, launched fierce attacks on the Indian 17th Division's positions at Bishenpur 20 May 1944, but failed to break through, suffering 70% casualties by the June 1944.

By 2 June 1944, Renya Mutaguchi's divisional commanders refused to make a renewed attacks on Imphal, as they were in no condition to comply. Renya Mutaguchi finally ordered the offensive to be broken off on 3 July 1944. The Japanese fell back to the Chindwin River, abandoning their artillery, transport, and soldiers too sick to walk. The defeat at Kohima and Imphal was the largest defeat to that date in Japanese history. They had suffered 55,000 casualties, including 13,500 dead.

=== Later Operations in Burma ===
The Division was rebuilt to a strength of about 10,000. When the Allies launched their offensive (Battle of Meiktila and Mandalay) into Central Burma, the Japanese withdrew behind the Irrawaddy River. A rearguard from 33rd Division took heavy losses defending the river port of Monywa on the Chindwin River. During opening stages of the Battle of Pokoku and Irrawaddy River operations in February-March 1945 after the Allies crossed the Irrawaddy River, the 33rd Division defended the vital river port of Myingyan. It was not directly attacked, as the Allied bridgeheads were east and west of their positions. The division held Myingyan until most of 15th army were already in full retreat. The 33rd division suffered further casualties while retreating southward.

At the end of the war, the division had moved to Moulmein in southern Burma.

== See also ==
- List of Japanese Infantry Divisions
- Battle of Imphal
