= Third Area Army =

- Active: October 29, 1943 - August 15, 1945
- Country: Empire of Japan
- Branch: Imperial Japanese Army
- Type: Infantry
- Role: Field Army
- Garrison/HQ: Mukden
- Nickname(s): 強 (Kyō = “mighty”)
- Engagements: Soviet invasion of Manchuria

The Third Area Army (第3方面軍, Dai san hōmen gun) was a field army of the Imperial Japanese Army during World War II, based in southern Manchukuo and active in combat against the Soviet Union in the very final stages of the war.

== History ==
The Japanese 3rd Area Army was formed on October 29, 1943 under the control of the Kwantung Army as a military reserve and garrison force to maintain security and public order in southern Manchukuo as many veteran divisions of the Kwantung Army were transferred to the various southern fronts in the Pacific War. It consisted mostly of minimally-trained reservists, conscripted students and home guard militia, without adequate weapons or supplies. The 3rd Area Army was headquartered in Mukden.

The units of the 3rd Area Army proved to be no match for the Red Army when the Soviet Union invaded Manchukuo towards the end of World War II. General Jun Ushiroku refused orders from Kwantung Army Headquarters to retreat, and launched a counterattack along the Mukden–Port Arthur railway, along which many Japanese civilians were fleeing. However, General Uchiroku was hampered by lack of armor and by insufficient ammunition, and by August 13, 1945, his formations were largely shattered. A mutiny by the Manchukuo Imperial Army at Shinkyō ended his attempts to regroup. Many surviving soldiers of the 3rd Area Army, including General Ushiroku, became prisoners in Siberia and other parts of the Soviet Union after the surrender of Japan on August 15, 1945.

== List of Commanders ==
=== Commanding officer ===
	Name	From	To
1	General Naozaburo Okabe	29 October 1943	25 August 1944
2	General Jun Ushiroku	25 August 1944	15 August 1945

=== Chief of Staff ===
	Name	From	To
1	Major General Yo Watanabe	29 October 1943	26 October 1944
2	Major General Masao Yano	26 October 1944	23 March 1945
3	Major General Kazama Otsubo	23 March 1945	15 August 1945
