= China Expeditionary Army =

General army of the Imperial Japanese Army (1939–1945)

- Japanese: 支那派遣軍, Shina hakengun
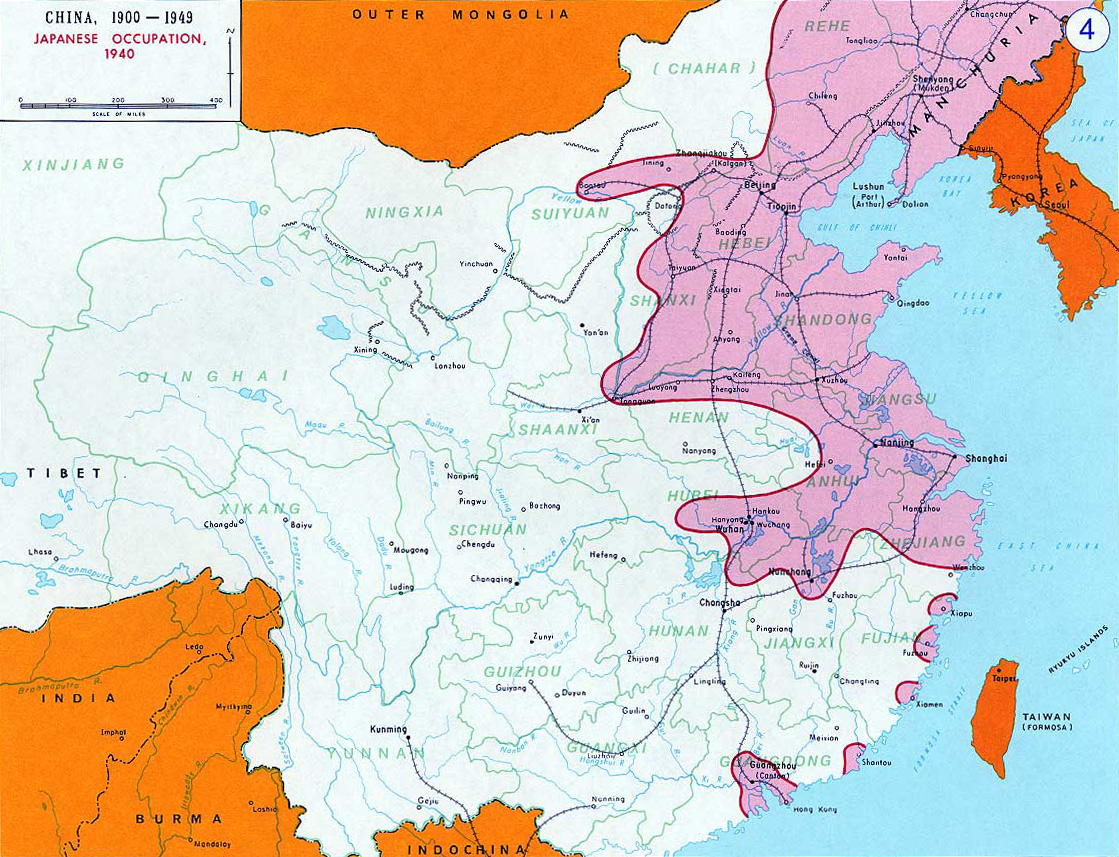
- Japanese Occupation - Map
- Active: 12 September 1939 – 15 August 1945
- Country: Empire of Japan
- Allegiance: Emperor of Japan
- Branch: Imperial Japanese Army
- Type: General Army
- Size: 1,050,000 personnel
- Garrison/HQ: Nanjing
- Nicknames: Eishudan (栄集団, Prosperous)
- Engagements: Second Sino-Japanese War

The China Expeditionary Army (Shina hakengun) was a general army of the Imperial Japanese Army from 1939 to 1945.

The China Expeditionary Army was established in September 1939 from the merger of the Central China Expeditionary Army and Japanese Northern China Area Army, and was headquartered in the pro-Japanese Reorganized National Government's capital city of Nanjing. The China Expeditionary Army was responsible for all Japanese military operations in China except in the puppet state of Manchukuo, which Japan claimed was not part of China, and was the main fighting force during the Second Sino-Japanese War, with over 1 million soldiers under its command at its peak. The China Expeditionary Army was dissolved upon the Surrender of Japan in August 1945. The separate Kwantung army was the main Japanese army occupying Manchukuo, and had another 1 million Japanese troops alongside over a million Japanese settlers in Manchukuo, separate from the China Expeditionary Army's million troops.

Japan had yet another third army, the Burma Area Army, attacking China from its southwestern border with Burma at the Battle of Northern Burma and Western Yunnan in the Battle of Mount Song and Battle of Tengchong in western Yunnan in 1942, 1943 and 1944.

The Burma Area Army, Kwantung Army and China Expeditionary Army were three separate Japanese armies that fought against China, so the total number of Japanese troops that fought against China was over double the number of the China Expeditionary Army.

In military literature, the China Expeditionary Army is often referred to by the initials "CEA".

== History ==
After the Lugou Bridge Incident, the Japanese China Garrison Army was reinforced with the Shanghai Expeditionary Army. This force was further supplemented by the Japanese Tenth Army, and marched inland from Shanghai to occupy Hangzhou. In October 1937, this force was renamed the Japanese Central China Area Army. After the fall of Nanjing, the Central China Expeditionary Army was formed. On September 12, 1939, by Army Order 362, the China Expeditionary Army was formed with the merger of the Central China Expeditionary Army with the Northern China Area Army. It was headquartered in Nanjing throughout the Second Sino-Japanese War.

The North China Area Army was maintained as a subordinate unit headquartered in Beijing and was responsible for operations in the north China plains from the Yellow River to the Great Wall, including Inner Mongolia.

The Japanese Sixth Area Army covered central and southern China, and several independent armies reporting directly to the central command in Nanjing were used for garrison, strategic reserve and for specific operations.

By the war's end it consisted of 1,050,000 men in one armored and 25 infantry divisions. It also contained over 22 independent brigades; 11 infantry, 1 cavalry, and 10 mixed (combined infantry, artillery, armor and support units). Towards the end of the war much of its ammunition reserve and many of its units had been transferred into the Pacific Theater leaving the China Expeditionary Army weak and undermanned.

The China Expeditionary Army surrendered on August 15, 1945, but its troops remained armed to provide security until Allied troops arrived.

== Commanders ==
=== Commanding officer ===
	Name	From	To
1	General Toshizō Nishio	12 September 1939	1 March 1941
2	Field Marshal Shunroku Hata	1 March 1941	23 November 1944
3	General Yasuji Okamura	23 November 1944	15 August 1945

=== Chief of Staff ===
	Name	From	To
1	General Seishirō Itagaki	4 September 1939	7 July 1941
2	Lieutenant General Jun Ushiroku	7 July 1941	17 August 1942
3	General Masakazu Kawabe	17 August 1942	18 March 1943
4	Lieutenant General Takuro Matsui	18 March 1943	1 February 1945
5	Lieutenant General Asasaburo Kobayashi	1 February 1945	15 August 1945

== See also ==
- Armies of the Imperial Japanese Army
