= Fifteenth Army (Japan) =

Japanese Fifteenth Army
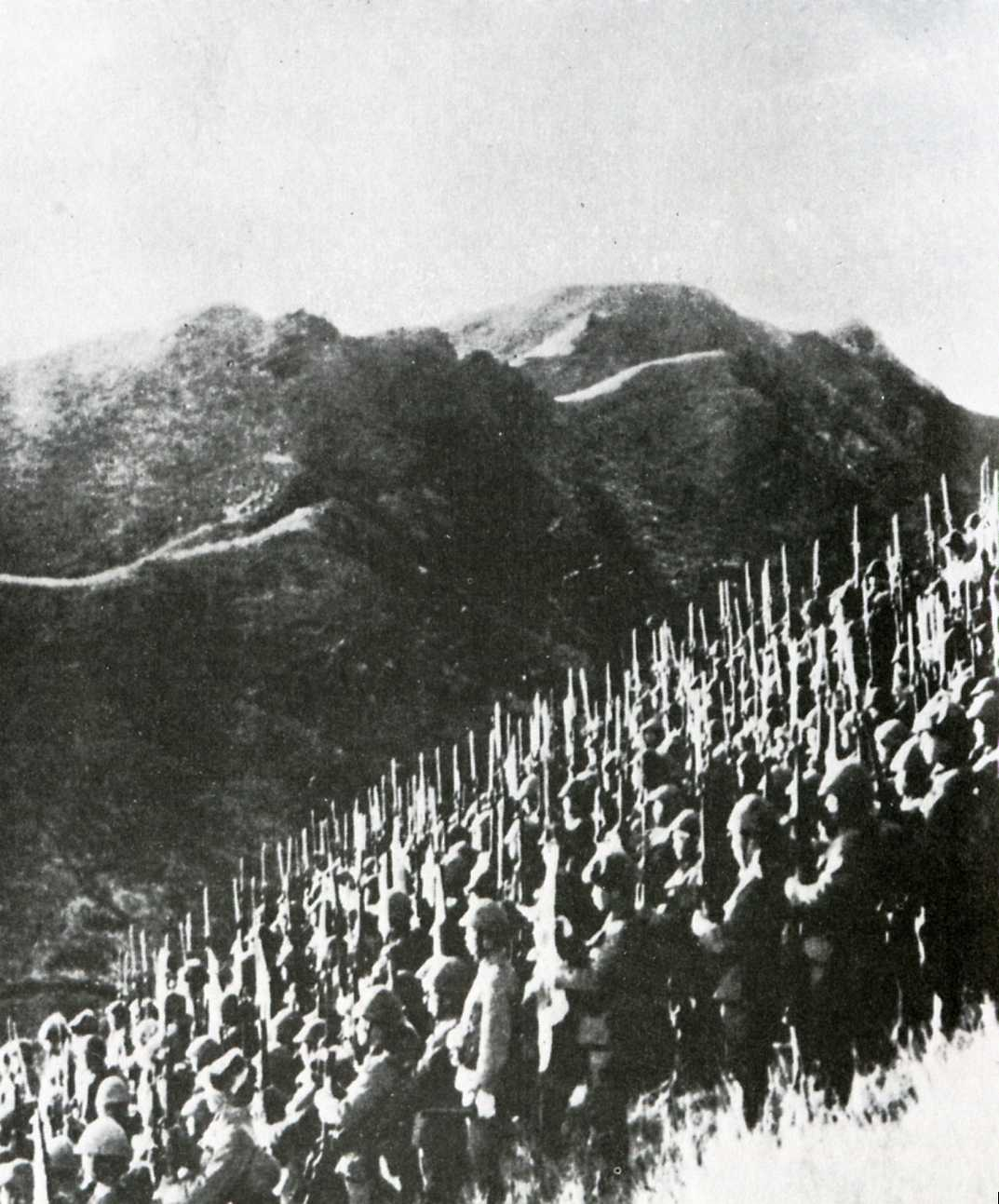
- Japanese troops on border of Burma
- Active: 9 November 1941 – 15 August 1945
- Country: Empire of Japan
- Branch: Imperial Japanese Army
- Type: Infantry
- Size: Corps
- Garrison/HQ: Rangoon
- Nicknames: Hayashi Shūdan (林集団, Grove)
- Engagements: World War II; Invasion of Thailand; Burma Campaign

The Japanese 15th Army (第15軍, Dai-jyūgo gun) was an infantry corps of the Imperial Japanese Army (IJA) during World War II that specialized in banzai charge, combined arms, jungle warfare, and maneuver warfare. It was involved in the Japanese invasion of Burma in December 1941 and served in that country for most of its war service.

== History ==
The Japanese 15th Army was formed on November 9, 1941, as a component of the Southern Expeditionary Army Group for the specific task of invading the British colony of Burma. To do this the army, then based in Indo-China, needed to transit through Thailand. On December 8, 1941, the 33rd and 55th Divisions of the army spearheaded by the Imperial Guard invaded Thailand overland from what is now Cambodia. The invasion was supported by landings on the coast to the south of Bangkok by the army's 143rd Infantry Regiment. Fighting lasted only a few hours before the Thai government ceded access.

Under Lieutenant General Shōjirō Iida, the IJA 15th Army invaded the southern Burmese province of Tenasserim. The Fifteenth Army consisted initially of the highly regarded 33rd Infantry Division and the 55th Infantry Division. The latter attacked from northern Thailand, which had signed a treaty of friendship with Japan on December 21, 1941. The 15th Army quickly advanced through southern Burma, defeating the British and Indian Burma Army in several engagements, and capturing the capital of Rangoon by March 7, 1942. The Army was reinforced by troops released by the Fall of Singapore and drove northwards into central Burma, defeating the British Burma Corps and the Chinese Expeditionary Force, ultimately driving the Allies from Burma.

During the following year, the Army remained as a garrison force in Burma, defeating an Allied offensive in Arakan and inflicting heavy casualties on a long-range penetration raid under Orde Wingate.

In 1944, the Fifteenth Army became part of the Burma Area Army. Lieutenant General Iida was posted back to Japan and Lieutenant General Renya Mutaguchi took command. He forcefully advocated an offensive against British India. The offensive, Operation U-Go, was launched in March. As a result of poor logistics and Mutaguchi's underestimation of the difficulties, the Fifteenth Army was almost destroyed in the Battle of Imphal and the Battle of Kohima.

Mutaguchi, his chief of staff, and several other officers were removed in the aftermath, and Lieutenant General Shihachi Katamura was assigned to command. As the monsoon season ended, the remnants of the Fifteenth Army attempted to forestall an Allied offensive into Burma by withdrawing behind the Irrawaddy River. They were unable to prevent British and Indian troops from securing bridgeheads across the river, and the army was weakened by losses and detachments to other parts of the front. Once Mandalay was captured, the Fifteenth Army could only retreat southwards, badly disorganised and was further depleted in the failed Japanese breakout of the Pegu Yomas in July and August 1945.

The remnants of the Fifteenth Army were later absorbed as a subsidiary unit of the 18th Area Army. The 15th Army was demobilized at Lampang Province in Thailand, on the surrender of Japan in 1945.

== List of Commanders ==
=== Commanding officers ===
	Name	From	To
1	Lieutenant General Shōjirō Iida	5 November 1941	18 March 1943
2	Lieutenant General Renya Mutaguchi	18 March 1943	30 August 1944
3	Lieutenant General Shihachi Katamura	30 August 1944	15 August 1945

=== Chief of staff ===
	Name	From	To
1	Lieutenant General Haruki Isayama	14 November 1941	1 December 1942
2	Lieutenant General Eitaro Naka	1 December 1942	18 March 1943
3	General Hideyoshi Obata	18 March 1943	26 May 1943
4	Lieutenant General Todai Kunomura	26 May 1943	22 September 1944
5	Major General Gonpachi Yoshida	22 September 1944	September 1945
