= Kesago Nakajima =

Japanese general

- 中島 今朝吾
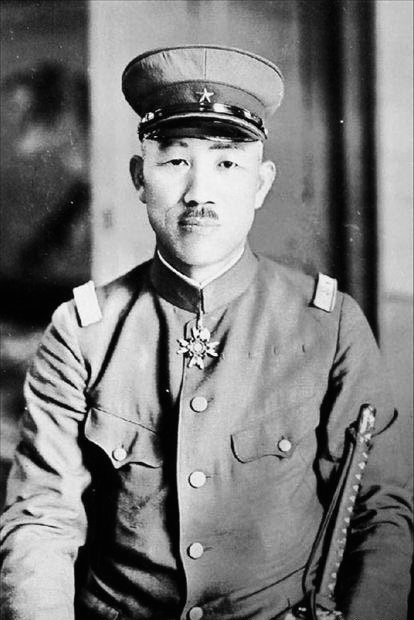
- Born: June 15, 1881; Yahata, Oita, Japan
- Died: October 28, 1945 (aged 64); Miyota, Nagano, Japan
- Military career
- Allegiance: Empire of Japan
- Branch: Imperial Japanese Army
- Service years: 1903–1939
- Rank: Lieutenant General
- Commands: IJA 16th Division, IJA 4th Army
- Conflicts: Russo-Japanese War; Second Sino-Japanese War

Kesago Nakajima (中島 今朝吾, Nakajima Kesago; 15 June 1881 – 28 October 1945) was a lieutenant general in the Imperial Japanese Army. During the Second Sino-Japanese War, Japanese forces under Nakajima's command committed the 1937 Nanjing Massacre.

== Biography ==
A native of Oita prefecture, Nakajima attended military preparatory schools as a youth, and graduated from the 15th class of the Imperial Japanese Army Academy in 1903. He served in combat in the Russo-Japanese War. After the war, he attended the Army War College (Japan), and graduated from the 25th class in 1913. From July 1918 to May 1923, he was stationed in France as a military attaché. He was promoted to major general in April 1932 and was appointed commander of the Maizuru Army District, responsible for the defenses of Honshū’s coast along the Sea of Japan.

Nakajima served as commandant of the Narashino Chemical Warfare School from 1933 to 1936. In March 1936, he was promoted to lieutenant general and was appointed a Provost Marshal. With the start of the Second Sino-Japanese War, Nakajima was appointed commander of the IJA 16th Division, and participated in the Second Shanghai Incident and operations in Hebei, China. Under the elderly General Iwane Matsui, Nakajima was named Operational Commander in the Battle of Nanjing in late-1937 and was thus the senior officer (aside from the nominal commander in chief Prince Asaka) at the time of the Nanjing massacre. Nakajima personally loaned his sword to be used in the killings at Nanjing, and laughed as he and his men carried out the massacres.

Nakaijma was subsequently at the Battle of Wuhan before being transferred to take command of the Japanese Fourth Army in Manchukuo from 1938 to 1939.

Recalled to Japan in 1939, Nakajima retired in September 1939 and died in October 1945 of illness.
