= Shōjirō Iida =

Japanese military officer (1888–1980)

- 飯田 祥二郎
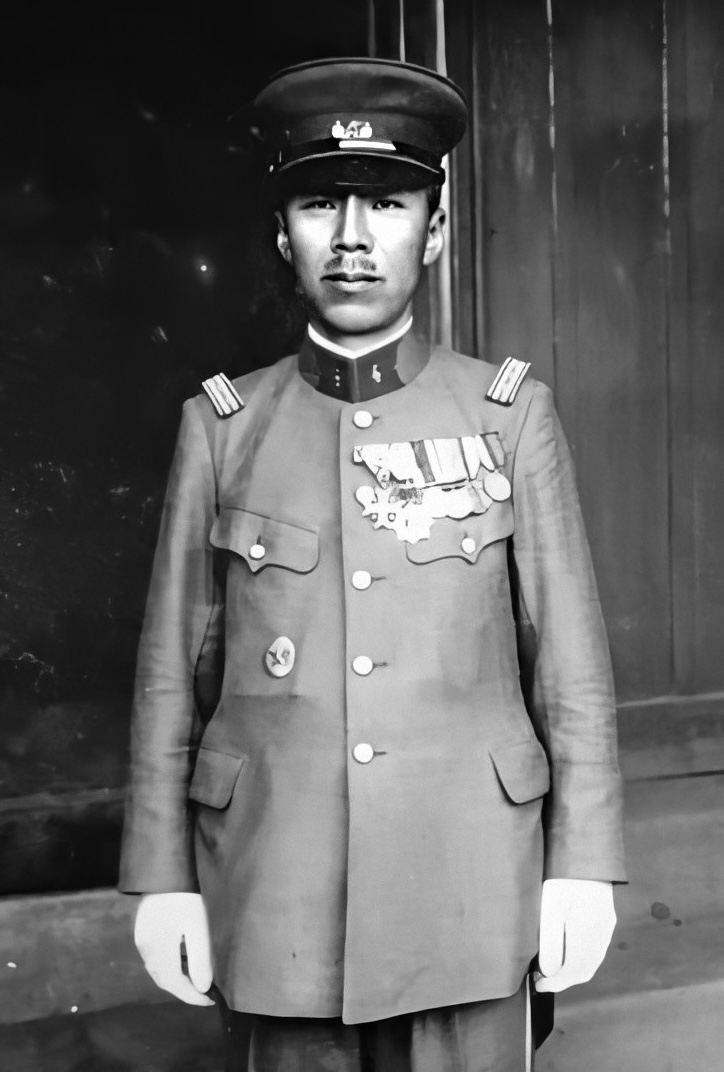
- Born: August 8, 1888; Yamaguchi prefecture, Japan
- Died: January 23, 1980 (aged 91); Tokyo, Japan
- Military career
- Allegiance: Japan
- Branch: Imperial Japanese Army
- Service years: 1908–1945
- Rank: Lieutenant General
- Commands: Imperial Guard, 25th Army, 15th Army, 30th Army
- Conflicts: Siberian Intervention; Second Sino-Japanese War; World War II

Shōjirō Iida (飯田 祥二郎, Iida Shōjirō; 8 August 1888 – 23 January 1980) was a general in the Imperial Japanese Army in World War II.

== Biography ==
Iida was a native of Yamaguchi prefecture and a graduate of the 20th class of the Imperial Japanese Army Academy in 1908 and the 27th class of the Army Staff College in December 1915. Iida was promoted to captain in December 1918. He participated in the Japanese Expeditionary force for the Siberian Intervention against the forces of the Bolshevik Army, supporting White Russian forces in Russia.

After serving in a variety of administrative positions within the Imperial Japanese Army General Staff, including a stint as an instructor at the Infantry School from 1932 to 1934, Iida was appointed commander of the 4th Imperial Guards Regiment from 1934 to 1935. He was subsequently Chief of Staff of the IJA 4th Division from 1935 to 1937.

With the start of the Second Sino-Japanese War, Iida became Chief of Staff of the Japanese First Army in China in 1938. Iida was promoted to lieutenant general in August 1939. He was assigned to command the Taiwan Army of Japan from 1938 to 1939. In 1939, he returned to the Imperial Guard as its commander, and held the post until 1941.

With the start of the Pacific War, Iida was transferred south to take command of the Japanese 25th Army in Japanese-occupied French Indochina in 1941. He established his headquarters in Saigon and prepared for an invasion of Thailand. In December 1941, Iida took command of the newly formed Japanese Fifteenth Army, consisting of the IJA 33rd Division and IJA 55th Division. Beginning on 8 December, his forces easily overcame light Thai resistance, forcing Thailand into a mutual defense pact with Japan. On 20 January 1942, Iida's divisions crossed into Burma in the highly successful beginnings of the Burma Campaign.

Iida's 35,000 men quickly outmaneuvered British forces despite inclement terrain and limited supplies. On 8 March, Iida took Rangoon, cutting the Burma Road and isolating China. By May, British and Chinese forces in Burma had been driven back to India and China with some 30,000 casualties, against Japanese losses numbering only 7,000.

Recalled to Japan in 1943, Iida was reassigned to the General Defense Command. In 1944, he became Commander in Chief of the Central District Army. He retired from active military service in 1944.

However, in 1945, Iida was recalled back to service to take command of the Japanese 30th Army in Manchukuo just before the Soviet invasion. He was taken prisoner by the Red Army and was held as a prisoner of war in the Soviet Union from 1945 to 1950. He died in Tokyo on 23 January 1980.

=== Books ===
- Hayashi, Saburo; Cox, Alvin D (1959). Kogun: The Japanese Army in the Pacific War. Quantico, VA: The Marine Corps Association.
- Allen, Louis (1986). Burma: the Longest War 1941-45. J.M. Dent and Sons. ISBN 0-460-02474-4.
- Latimer, John (2004). Burma: The Forgotten War. John Murray. ISBN 978-0-7195-6576-2.

== Notes ==
Military offices
Preceded by first incumbent	Japanese military commander in British Crown Colony of Burma; 1942–1943	Succeeded by Masakazu Kawabe
