= Masakazu Kawabe =

Imperial Japanese Army general (1886–1965)

- 河辺 正三

Inspector-General of Military Training
- In office 12 September 1939 – 14 October 1940
- Monarch: Hirohito

Military commander of Burma
- In office 18 March 1943 – 30 August 1944
- Monarch: Hirohito
- Preceded by: Shōjirō Iida
- Succeeded by: Heitarō Kimura

Personal details
- Born: 5 December 1886 Toyama, Japan
- Died: 2 March 1965 (aged 78)
- Relatives: Torashirō Kawabe (brother)
- Education: Imperial Japanese Army Academy; Army Staff College
- Occupation: Instructor, military attaché

Military service
- Allegiance: Empire of Japan
- Branch/service: Imperial Japanese Army
- Years of service: 1907–1945
- Rank: General
- Unit: Inspectorate General of Military Training, North China Area Army, Central China Expeditionary Army, Kwantung Army, China Expeditionary Army, Supreme War Council
- Commands: 6th Infantry Regiment, Infantry School, Permanent China Brigade, 12th Division, 3rd Army, Burma Area Army, Central District Army, 15th Area Army, Air General Army
- Battles/wars: Second Sino-Japanese War; World War II; Burma campaign

Masakazu Kawabe (河辺 正三, Kawabe Masakazu; 5 December 1886 – 2 March 1965) was a general in the Imperial Japanese Army. He held important commands during the Second Sino-Japanese War and World War II, including the Burma campaign and the defense of the Japanese homeland late in the war. He was the elder brother of general Torashirō Kawabe.

== Biography ==
=== Early career ===
A native of Toyama Prefecture, Kawabe graduated from the 19th class of the Imperial Japanese Army Academy in 1907 and the 27th class of the Army Staff College in 1915. From 1927 to 1929, he served as an instructor at the War College. He was then assigned as a military attaché to Switzerland from 1918 to 1921 and to Berlin, Germany from 1929 to 1932. Promoted to infantry colonel in 1932, he served in a number of staff assignments on his return to Japan, before being assigned command of the IJA 6th Infantry Regiment from 1932 to 1933.

Kawabe as commander of the 6th Infantry Regiment

Kawabe went on to be Commandant of the Infantry School from 1933 to 1934, and was Chief of 1st Section within the Inspectorate General of Military Training from 1934 to 1936. He was promoted to major general in 1936.

=== Second Sino-Japanese War ===
At the beginning of the Second Sino-Japanese War Kawabe was sent to China to take command of the Permanent China Brigade, which had been involved in the Marco Polo Bridge incident. As the war expanded he was made Deputy Chief of Staff of the North China Area Army from 26 August 1937 until 14 April 1938 when he became Chief of Staff Central China Expeditionary Army from 15 February 1938 to 31 January 1939.

Kawabe was promoted to lieutenant general in March 1939. During his time in China, he was involved in the Battle of Xuzhou, Northern and Eastern Honan, Battle of Wuhan, Canton Operation, Battle of Nanchang, Battle of Suixian-Zaoyang, Battle of Changsha (1939), and the 1939-40 Winter Offensive. From 12 September 1939 to 14 October 1940 Kawabe was recalled to Japan, and held the powerful post of Inspector-General of Military Training. However, he returned to China as commander in chief of the IJA 12th Division in March 1940, serving under the Kwantung Army. Promoted to commander in chief of the IJA 3rd Army in March 1941, he subsequently was Chief of Staff of the China Expeditionary Army from 17 August 1942 to 18 March 1943.

=== Pacific War ===
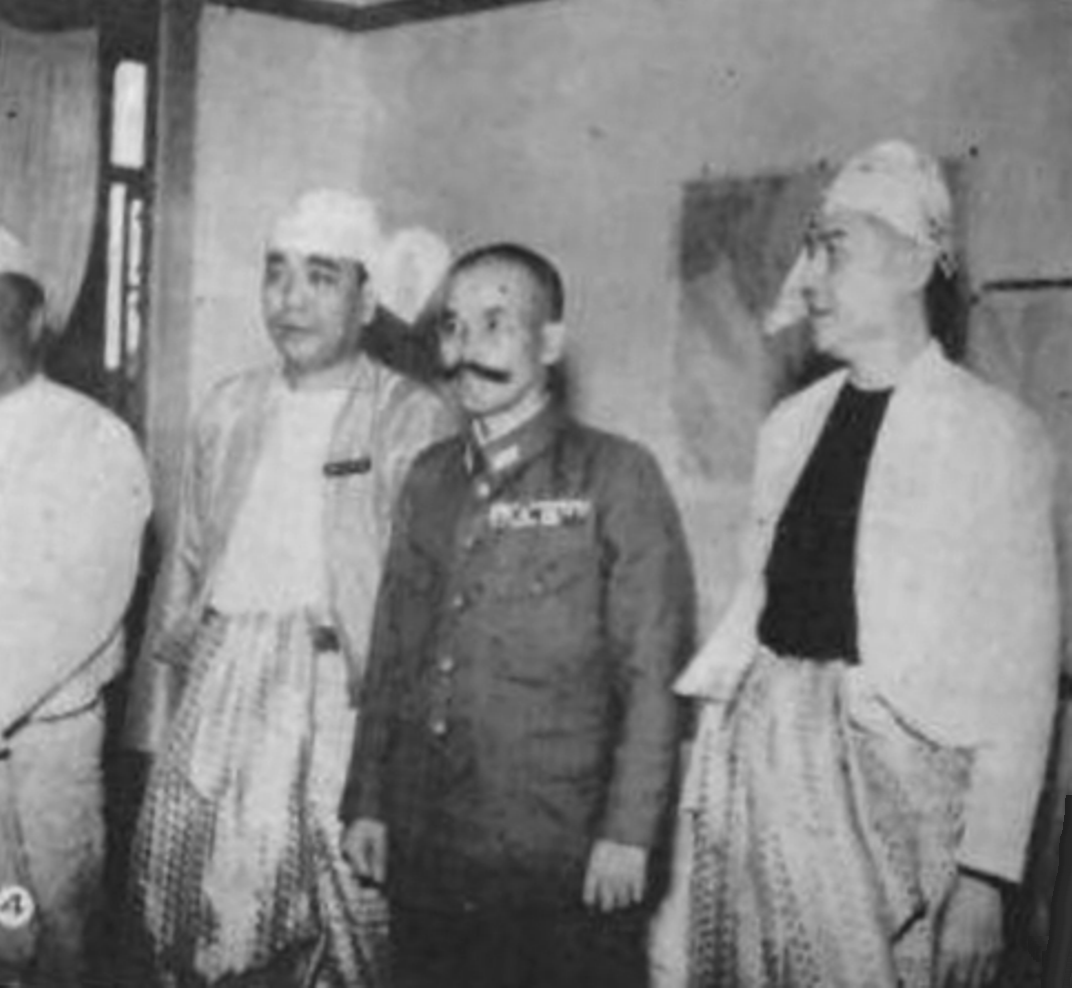
Kawabe as commander of the Japanese Burma Area Army, 1943

In March 1943, Kawabe was transferred to the southern front as Commander in Chief of the Burma Area Army. Arriving in Burma he was convinced to support Renya Mutaguchi, commander of the 15th Army and an old comrade-in-arms, in his plans for a pre-emptive attack against British forces at Imphal. The goal of this offensive was to disrupt the Allied build-up in that area, and perhaps, if all went well, make way for an invasion of Assam and British India. This plan was strongly opposed by most of Kawabe's commanders as well as Masazumi Inada, Vice-Chief of Staff of the Southern Expeditionary Army based in Singapore. The difficult supply situation was especially thought to be a major obstacle. However, in October 1943, Inada was removed from his position due to a diplomatic incident with Thailand and in December the plan was approved by General Hisaichi Terauchi and Prime Minister Hideki Tōjō on the understanding the operation would be a purely defensive one.

Mutaguchi's plan was a tremendous disaster for the Japanese army, resulting in the highest casualties of any operation in the entire war, and the loss of Burma. During the later stages of this offensive, Kawabe was bedridden with amoebic dysentery. Kawabe was relieved by General Heitarō Kimura on 30 August 1944 and returned to Japan.

Kawabe served for a short time on the Supreme War Council. In the final stages of the war, experienced commanders were needed to organize the defenses of the Japanese home islands. Kawabe became Commander in Chief of the Central District Army on 1 December 1944, he also became Commander in Chief of the 15th Area Army from its formation on 1 February 1945 to 7 April 1945. Kawabe was promoted to full general in March 1945. On 8 April 1945 he took command of Air General Army, consisting of the remaining air units in Japan, Korea and Okinawa, for the final defense of Japan against the anticipated Allied invasion.

After the surrender of Japan, Kawabe was retained by the SCAP occupation authorities to assist with the demobilization of the Japanese military, replacing Kenji Doihara after the latter was arrested and tried for war crimes. Kawabe retired at the end of 1945 and died 20 years later.

Military offices
| Preceded by Shōjirō Iida | Japanese military commander in British Crown Colony of Burma; 1943–1944 | Succeeded by Heitarō Kimura |

== See also ==
- Organization of Japanese Expeditionary forces in China
