= Renya Mutaguchi =

Imperial Japanese Army officer (1888–1966)

- 牟田口 廉也
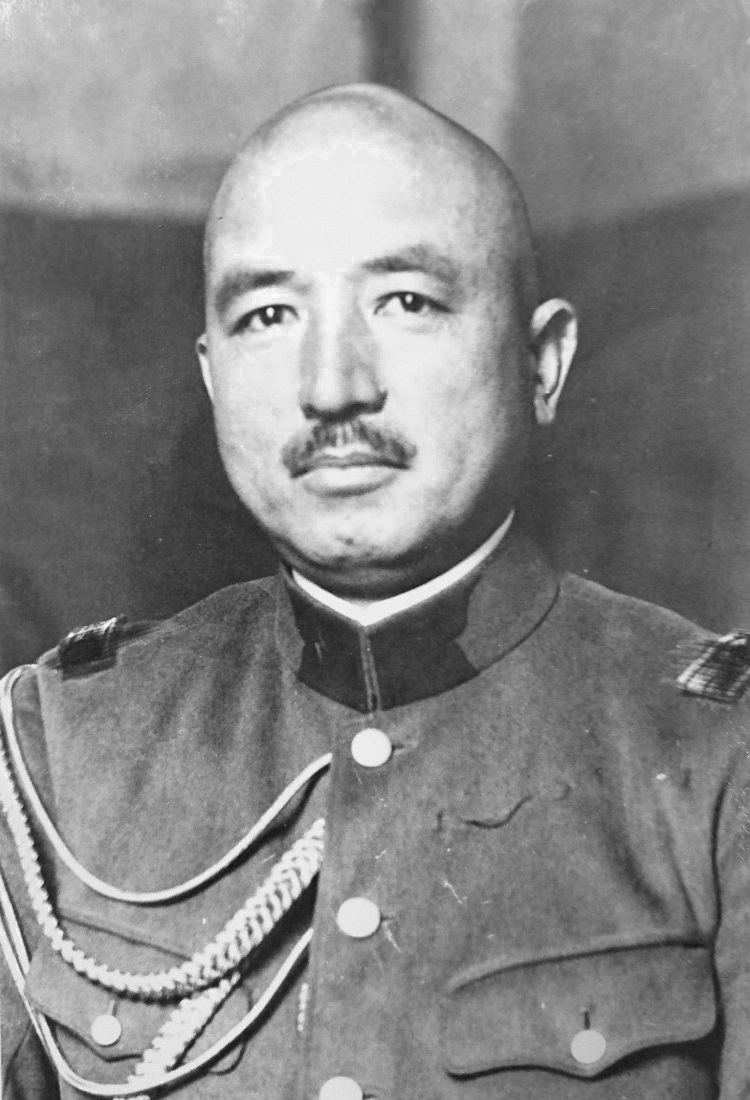
- Born: 7 October 1888; Saga Prefecture, Kyushu
- Died: 2 August 1966 (aged 77); Chōfu, Tokyo
- Military career
- Allegiance: Empire of Japan
- Branch: Imperial Japanese Army
- Service years: 1910–1945
- Rank: Lieutenant-General
- Commands: IJA 18th Division, IJA 15th Army
- Conflicts: Siberian Intervention; Second Sino-Japanese War; World War II; Battle of Pasir Panjang; Operation U-Go

Lieutenant-General Renya Mutaguchi (牟田口 廉也, Mutaguchi Ren'ya; 7 October 1888 – 2 August 1966) was an Imperial Japanese Army officer who served in World War II. He was the field commander of Japanese forces during the Battle of Imphal.

== Biography ==
Mutaguchi was a native of Saga Prefecture. He graduated from the 22nd class of the Imperial Japanese Army Academy in 1910 and from the 29th class of the Army Staff College in 1917.

Mutaguchi served in the Japanese forces with the Siberian Intervention against the Bolshevik Red Army in the Russian Far East. Afterwards, he was sent as a military attaché to France.

Promoted to major in 1926 and colonel in 1930, from 1933–1936 he served in the General Affairs Section of the Imperial Japanese Army General Staff in Tokyo, before being transferred to China in 1936 to take command of the Japanese garrison force in Beijing. He was commander of the IJA 1st Infantry Regiment in China from 1936–1938. Units responsible to Mutaguchi were involved in the Marco Polo Bridge Incident of 7 July 1937, which helped launch the Second Sino-Japanese War.

Mutaguchi was promoted to major general in 1938, and served as Chief of Staff of the Fourth Army from 1938–1939. He was then recalled to Japan and served from 1939–1941 as Commandant of the Military Preparatory School.

Promoted to lieutenant general in 1940, with the start of the Pacific War, Mutaguchi was given command of the 18th Division in April 1941. This division was active in the invasion of Malaya in the early stages of the war, and Mutaguchi himself was wounded during the Battle of Singapore in February 1942. After the fall of Singapore, the 18th Division was transferred to the Philippines to reinforce units pushing the remaining American forces down the Bataan Peninsula. In April 1942, the 18th Division was reassigned to Burma.

Mutaguchi was then made commander of the Fifteenth Army from March 1943, and strongly pushed forward his own plan to advance into Assam, leading to the Battle of Imphal. After the failure of the Imphal offensive in May 1944, Mutaguchi refused to allow his divisional commanders to retreat, and instead dismissed all three of them. He eventually called off the attack on 3 July. Some 55,000 of Mutaguchi's 85,000-man force ended up as casualties, most dying from starvation or disease. This was the worst defeat suffered by the Japanese army at that time. With the complete collapse of the offensive, Mutaguchi was relieved of command on 30 August and recalled to Tokyo. He was forced into retirement in December 1944.

Mutaguchi was recalled briefly to active service in 1945, to resume his former post as Commandant of the Military Preparatory School.

After the end of the war, he was arrested by the American occupation authorities and extradited to Singapore, where he faced a military tribunal which convicted him of war crimes. Released from prison in March 1948, he returned to Japan. Mutaguchi died in Tokyo on 2 August 1966.

== Reputation ==
British historian Frank McLynn characterized Mutaguchi as "eccentric," "reckless," and a "fanatic," citing his decision to provide his soldiers with only twenty days of food for the nearly four month-long Battle of Imphal. This led to catastrophic loss of life due to starvation and disease for the Imperial Japanese Army in the battle.

The novelist Takagi Toshirō claimed that after the war Mutaguchi distributed pamphlets at veterans' funerals claiming that he had won the battle. Takagi provided no evidence for this, and in 2022, a military historian called it a fabrication.

== Depictions ==
He was portrayed by Kim Ki-joo in the 1991–1992 MBC TV series Eyes of Dawn and by T. S. Jeffrey in the 2015 Malaysian film Kapsul.
