= 111th Division (Imperial Japanese Army) =

- 第111師団
- Active: 1944–1945
- Country: Empire of Japan
- Allegiance: 58th Army
- Branch: Imperial Japanese Army
- Type: Infantry
- Garrison/HQ: Dongning
- Nickname: City Division
- Engagements: none

Commanders
- Notable commanders: Takao Iwasaki

The 111th Division (第111師団, Dai-hyakujūichi Shidan) was an infantry division of the Imperial Japanese Army. Its call sign was the City Division (市兵団, Ichi Heidan). It was formed 12 July 1944 in Dongning as a triangular division. The nucleus for the formation was the 9th Independent Garrison Group. The division was initially assigned to the Third Army.

== Action ==
Initially the 111th Division was assigned garrison duty around Dongning.

In April 1945, it was reassigned to the Fifty-Eighth Army and in May 1945 moved to the Jejudo island. Small parts were left behind and were incorporated into the 124th Division. On Jejudo, the unit spent time until the surrender of Japan preparing a fortifications without seeing combat.

The division was repatriated to Sasebo 10–12 November 1945 and dissolved shortly afterwards.

== See also ==
- List of Japanese infantry divisions

== Sources ==
- This article incorporates material from Japanese Wikipedia page 第111師団 (日本軍), accessed 27 June 2016
- Madej, W. Victor, Japanese Armed Forces Order of Battle, 1937–1945 [2 vols], Allentown, PA: 1981.
