= 2nd Red Banner Army =

Soviet field army of World War II

- 2-я Краснознамённая армия
- Active: July 1938 – December 1945
- Country: Soviet Union
- Branch: Red Army
- Size: 9 August 1945: around 54,000 men; 240 tanks; 1,270 guns and mortars
- Part of: Far Eastern Front
- Engagements: World War II; Invasion of Manchuria
- Decorations: Order of the Red Banner

Commanders
- Notable commanders: Ivan Konev

The 2nd Red Banner Army (Russian: 2-я Краснознамённая армия, romanized: 2-ya Krasnoznamennaya armiya) was a Soviet field army of World War II that served as part of the Far Eastern Front.

The army was formed at Khabarovsk in the Soviet Far East in 1938 as the 2nd Army. After the Far Eastern Front was split in September that year it became the 2nd Independent Red Banner Army. When the front was reformed in June 1940, the army was redesignated as the 2nd Red Banner Army, stationed in the Blagoveshchensk area. It spent the bulk of World War II guarding the border in that area, sending formations to the Eastern Front while undergoing several reorganizations. In August 1945, the army fought in the Soviet invasion of Manchuria, capturing the Japanese fortified regions of Aihun and Sunwu adjacent to its sector of the border, and advancing into Manchuria to Qiqihar. The army was disbanded after the war in late 1945.

== History ==
=== Before 1941 ===
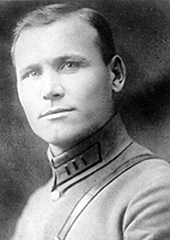
Ivan Konev, who commanded the army between 1938 and 1940

Owing to increased tensions with Japan, the 2nd Army was created in July 1938 on the Far Eastern frontiers of the Soviet Union from the 18th Rifle Corps as part of the Far Eastern Red Banner Front. It was commanded by then-Komkor (Corps commander) Ivan Konev. In September, the front was dissolved and its troops were split into two independent armies, which both inherited the Order of the Red Banner previously awarded to the front. The army, redesignated as the 2nd Independent Red Banner Army (2nd OKA), still under Konev's command, was headquartered at Khabarovsk and controlled troops in the oblasts of the Lower Amur, Khabarovsk, Primorsky, Sakhalin, and Kamchatka, the Jewish Autonomous Oblast, and the okrugs of Koryak and Chukotka. It was directly subordinate to the People's Commissariat of Defense and operationally controlled the Amur Red Banner Flotilla. The 2nd OKA included the 3rd, 12th, 34th, 35th, 69th, and 78th Rifle Divisions during its existence, as well as the fortified regions of De-Kastri, Lower Amur, Ust-Sungari and Blagoveshchensk.

Elements of the army fought in the Battles of Khalkhin Gol, a series of border clashes between the Soviet Union and Japan, in mid-1939 under the control of other formations. On 4 October 1939, the Northern Army Group was established at Nikolayevsk-on-Amur, controlling troops in the fortified regions of Nikolayevsk-on-Amur and De-Kastri, Kamchatka and Sakhalin. Subordinated to the 2nd OKA, the group operationally controlled the Northern Pacific Flotilla. By an order dated 21 June 1940, the Far Eastern Front was recreated and the headquarters of the 2nd Independent Red Banner Army was abolished and used to form the headquarters of the 2nd and 15th Armies. The 2nd (Blagoveshchensk) Red Banner Army (2nd KA) was headquartered at Kuibyshevka. It included the 3rd and 12th Rifle Divisions and the 69th Motorized Division (the former 69th Rifle Division, stationed in the Blagoveshchensk area). The 34th, 35th, and 78th Rifle Divisions became part of the 15th Army. Lieutenant General Vsevolod Sergeyev became army commander on 22 June. On 27 August, the 31st Mixed Aviation Division (SmAD) was formed from its 26th Mixed Aviation Brigade. In March 1941, the 59th Tank Division was formed in the Khabarovsk area as part of the army. Lieutenant General Makar Teryokhin replaced Sergeyev on 11 March. By 22 June the army also included the 101st Blagoveshchensk and the Ust-Bureysk Fortified Regions.

=== World War II ===
==== Garrison duty in the Far East ====
During World War II, the army covered the border around Blagoveshchensk and sent reinforcements to the active forces fighting on the Eastern Front. Following the beginning of Operation Barbarossa, the German invasion of the Soviet Union, on 22 June 1941, a directive dated 25 June transferred the 59th Tank and 69th Motorized Divisions by rail to the Eastern Front. On 28 June the 31st SmAD departed for the Eastern Front, and remaining units, including the 3rd Fighter Aviation Regiment, were made directly subordinate to the Air Force (VVS) of the 2nd KA. In August the 95th Mixed Aviation Division was formed in the VVS of the 2nd KA; it became the 95th Fighter Aviation Division (IAD) by 1 September.

By 1 September, the army included the Svobodny Rifle Division, and the 82nd Bomber Aviation Division (BAD) had been added to the VVS of the 2nd KA. By 1 October the Svobodny Rifle Division had been replaced by the 204th Rifle Division, the 95th IAD had become the 95th SmAD, and the 96th SmAD had been created. By 1 November, the 1st and 2nd Rifle Brigades and the Zeya and Blagoveshchensk separate rifle regiments had been formed in the army. The 95th SmAD had again been redesignated as the 95th IAD by 1 December, and a separate cavalry regiment and the 73rd and 74th Tank Brigades had been formed. As of 1 December the two separate rifle regiments had disappeared from the order of battle and the 1st and 2nd Rifle Brigades were shown as being part of the 101st Fortified Region.

The Ust-Bureysk Fortified Region was likely disbanded in December, as it does not appear in the order of battle for 1 January 1942. The 95th IAD became an SmAD again in December. In January the 82nd BAD briefly transferred to the VVS of the Far Eastern Front, but transferred back to the army's VVS in February. Around the same time the 96th Rifle Division and 258th and 259th Rifle Brigades became part of the army. In March the 95th SmAD was disbanded and its units directly subordinated to the army's VVS. The 96th SmAD was converted into an IAD in May. In July, the 96th and 204th Rifle Divisions were shipped to the Eastern Front and the 17th and 41st Rifle Brigades were formed. The VVS of the army became a separate unit, the 11th Air Army, in August.

In April 1943, the 1st and 2nd Amur Tank Brigades were formed in the army, growing out of what were separate tank battalions; in June, the 1st was merged into the 2nd, becoming the 258th Tank Brigade in July. The army's composition remained constant for most of 1944; the 342nd and 355th Rifle Divisions were formed in the army in late November and December, respectively, from its four rifle brigades. The 345th and the 396th Rifle Divisions were formed in the army in March 1945. In July, the 342nd and the 345th Divisions transferred out of the army to the 87th Rifle Corps and the 355th Division joined the Chuguyevka Operational Group, an independent unit directly controlled by the Far Eastern Front headquarters.

==== Soviet invasion of Manchuria ====
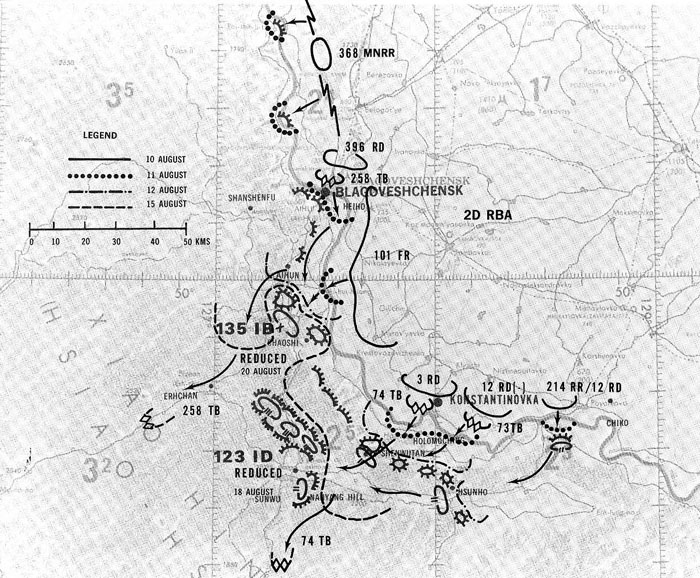
Operations of the 2nd Red Banner Army in the Soviet invasion of Manchuria, 8–15 August 1945

In preparation for the Soviet invasion of Manchuria, the army became part of the 2nd Far Eastern Front when the Far Eastern Front was split on 5 August. For the invasion, the army had a strength of 240 tanks and self-propelled guns, as well as 1,270 guns and mortars, and occupied a 612-mile (985 km) sector. It numbered 54,000 men out of a nominal strength of 59,000. The army's three rifle divisions were at around 90% of their nominal strength, with around 9,000 to 10,000 men each; the 3rd and 12th Divisions were slightly larger than the 396th. The 101st Fortified Region numbered 6,000 men and was almost at full strength. The army included three tank brigades (the 73rd, 74th, and 258th) and three self-propelled artillery battalions. Front commander Army General Maxim Purkayev initially tasked the army with defending the Blagoveshchensk area from Japanese attack, in cooperation with the Amur Flotilla's Zee-Bureysk Brigade and separate battalions of river ships. When the main Soviet attacks achieved success, the army was to launch an assault crossing of the Amur River, reduce or isolate the Japanese Sakhalian, Aihun, and Holomoching fortified regions and defenses around Sunwu, and advance south through the Lesser Khingan Mountains to Qiqihar and Harbin. The front's offensive operations were later known in Soviet historiography as the Sungari Offensive.

An operational group consisting of the 3rd and 12th Rifle Divisions, and the 73rd and 74th Tank Brigades, was positioned in the army's center and on its left flank. It was to attack south across the Amur from Konstantinovka to capture Sunwu and its fortifications, then advance south through Peian to Harbin. Another group with the 396th Rifle Division, the 368th Mountain Rifle Regiment, and the 258th Tank Brigade was to launch a supporting drive across the Amur from the Blagoveshchensk area, take the fortified regions of Sakhalian and Aihun, and advance south to Nencheng, Noho, and Qiqihar. The army's 101st Fortified Area, with artillery and machine gun battalions, was positioned on the Amur between the two groups to conduct supporting attacks.

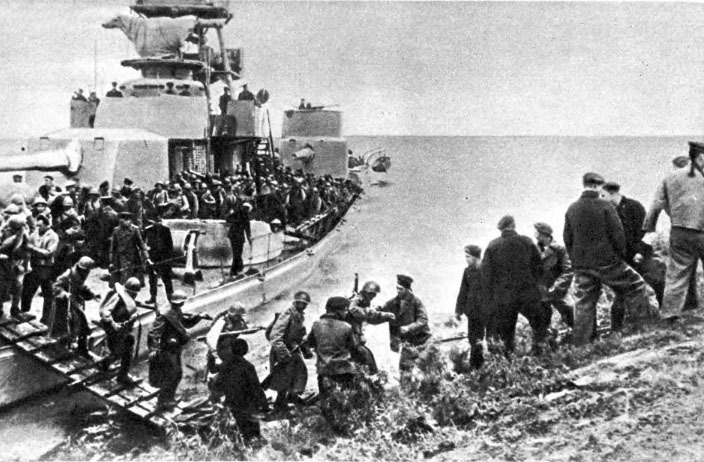
Soviet troops crossing the Sungari aboard a monitor of the Amur Flotilla during the Sungari Offensive

The main offensive began on 9 August, but the army remained in its positions until 11 August. During this time, it conducted reconnaissance and harassing attacks across the Amur, capturing several of the river's islands. The main bodies of the operational groups were placed in concentration areas, located 12–17 miles (19–27 km) in the army's rear. Due to the rapid advance of the other Soviet forces, Purkayev ordered the army late on 10 August to begin its attack early on the following morning. Aihun, Sunwu, and Hsunho were scheduled to be captured by the end of 11 August. That night, the operational groups moved forward to their attack starting positions. The attack began early in the morning under the cover of an artillery bombardment, as reconnaissance and assault detachments from the first echelons of the operational groups crossed the Amur, capturing bridgeheads near Sakhalian, Aihun, and Holomoching, coming into contact with Japanese outposts and covering forces. The 3rd and 12th Rifle Divisions commenced crossing the river shortly afterwards, less one regiment, east and west of Konstantinovka; the 396th Division and 368th Regiment near Blagoveshchensk and the 101st Fortified Region crossed south of Blagoveshchensk.

Due to bridging equipment shortages, the army was not fully across the river until 16 August, forcing the piecemeal commitment of forces. Forward units continued to engage Japanese advanced positions south of Holomoching and north of Aihun on 12 August, as reinforcements landed. Sufficient troops to intensify the attack had arrived on the other bank of the Amur by 13 August, allowing the 3rd Rifle Division and 74th Tank Brigade to penetrate the Japanese defenses held by the 123rd Infantry Division's 269th Infantry Regiment on the heights northeast of Sunwu. A regiment from the 12th Division crossed the Amur east of Sunwu and advanced west along the Sunwu road, attacking the Japanese left flank. The 396th Division, 258th Tank Brigade and 368th Regiment pushed the 135th Independent Mixed Brigade back towards the main fortified region at Aihun, while small Japanese forces were destroyed by troops crossing the river father north at Huma and Santaoka.

Fierce fighting took place on 14 and 15 August for the main fortified regions east and north of Sunwu. Supported by the 73rd Tank Brigade, the 3rd and 12th Divisions broke through Japanese defenses at Shenwutan, scattering a detachment from the 269th Regiment, and driving another back towards Nanyang Hill, just east of Sunwu, and attacking the 123rd Division's main forces in the Sunwu Fortified Region. Meanwhile, the 74th Tank Brigade, reinforced by a rifle company, artillery battalion, and an antitank regiment, moved south and bypassed Sunwu, advancing to cut the Sunwu–Peian road. Taking advantage of the tank attack, the 396th Division and 368th Regiment advanced on Sunwu from the north, surrounding most of the 135th Brigade in the Aihun Fortified Region. A forward detachment was formed around the 74th Brigade to pursue the Japanese remnants southwest along the Nencheng road.

The 369th Rifle Division's second echelon 614th Rifle Regiment and the 101st Fortified Region were tasked with reducing the Aihun and Sunwu fortified regions, as the operational groups marched in two routes towards Nencheng and Peian, more than 93 miles (150 kilometers) apart. The advance was slowed by bad weather and muddy and rutted roads, and two engineer sapper battalions were attached to the lead detachments of the operational groups to speed up the advance. For the next several days, the bypassed Japanese troops continued to defend the Sakhalian, Aihun and Sunwu fortified regions, launching frequent attacks against the Soviet troops. After further heavy artillery and bombing from the Soviet 18th Mixed Aviation Corps of the 10th Air Army, Japanese resistance slackened on 17 and 18 August, and many defenders surrendered or were destroyed. Around Sunwu, a total of 17,061 Japanese military personnel were captured, while 4,520 soldiers at Aihun did not surrender until 20 August.

The Kwantung Army formally surrendered on 18 August, while the operational groups slowly advanced south, capturing Nencheng and Peian on 20 and 21 August, before moving towards Qiqihar and Harbin. The army reached Qiqihar on 21 August, where it linked up with troops from the 36th Army. The Japanese around the fortified regions were the most formidable faced by Soviet troops in the campaign, according to renowned historian David Glantz . The level of resistance and road conditions slowed the army's advance to an average of 20 kilometers a day, one of the lowest speeds of Soviet forces during the invasion; it advanced a depth of 200 kilometers into Manchuria. During the campaign, the army lost 645 killed, 1,817 wounded, and 74 missing.

=== Postwar ===
The 390th Rifle Division of the 5th Separate Rifle Corps was transferred to the army by 3 September 1945, along with the 32nd Guards Tank Brigade. After the war, the army briefly became part of the Far Eastern Military District, formed from the 2nd Far Eastern Front on 10 September. It was disbanded there in November 1945, the headquarters officially dissolving on 15 December. The 390th and 396th Divisions were disbanded with the army, while the 3rd and 12th Divisions transferred to the 26th Rifle Corps of the 1st Red Banner Army in the Transbaikal-Amur Military District.

== Commanders ==
The army was commanded by the following officers during its existence:

- Komkor (promoted to Komandarm 2nd rank March 1939) Ivan Konev (July 1938 – June 1940)
- Lieutenant General Vsevolod Sergeyev (22 June 1940 – 11 March 1941)
- Lieutenant General Makar Teryokhin (11 March 1941 – December 1945)

== Sources ==
- Bykov, Mikhail; Anokhin, Vladimir (2014). Все истребительные авиаполки Сталина. Первая полная энциклопедия [All Fighter Aviation Regiments of Stalin. The First Complete Encyclopedia] (in Russian). Moscow: Yauza-Eksmo. ISBN 9785457567276.
- Drig, Yevgeny (12 March 2007). "59 танковая дивизия" [59th Tank Division]. mechcorps.rkka.ru (in Russian). Archived from the original on 22 August 2012. – mechcorps.rkka.ru was the website of Russian historian Yevgeny Drig (Russian: Евгений Дриг)
- Drig, Yevgeny (6 January 2012). "69 моторизованная дивизия" [69th Motorized Division]. mechcorps.rkka.ru (in Russian). Archived from the original on 7 April 2012.
- Dvoinykh, L.V.; Kariaeva, T.F.; Stegantsev, M.V., eds. (1991). Центральный государственный архив Советской армии [Central State Archive of the Soviet Army] (in Russian). Vol. 1. Minneapolis: Eastview Publications. ISBN 1-879944-02-2.
- Dvoinykh, L.V.; Kariaeva, T.F.; Stegantsev, M.V., eds. (1993). Центральный государственный архив Советской армии [Central State Archive of the Soviet Army] (in Russian). Vol. 2. Minneapolis: Eastview Publications. ISBN 1-879944-03-0.
- Feskov, V.I.; Golikov, V.I.; Kalashnikov, K.A.; Slugin, S.A. (2013). Вооруженные силы СССР после Второй Мировой войны: от Красной Армии к Советской [The Armed Forces of the USSR after World War II: From the Red Army to the Soviet: Part 1 Land Forces] (in Russian). Tomsk: Scientific and Technical Literature Publishing. ISBN 9785895035306. Archived from the original on 2020-03-17.
- Glantz, David M. (2003). The Soviet Strategic Offensive in Manchuria, 1945: August Storm. London: Frank Cass. ISBN 0-7146-5279-2.
- Gurkin, V.V.; Malanin, K.A. (1963). Боевой состав Советской армии: Часть I (июнь-декабрь 1941 года) [Combat Composition of the Soviet Army, Part I (June–December 1941)] (PDF) (in Russian). Moscow: Military Historical Department of the Military Scientific Directorate of the General Staff.
- Gurkin, V.V.; et al. (1966). Боевой состав Советской армии: Часть II (Январь-декабрь 1942 года) [Combat Composition of the Soviet Army, Part II (January–December 1942)] (PDF) (in Russian). Moscow: Voenizdat.
- Gurkin, V.V.; et al. (1972). Боевой состав Советской армии: Часть III (Январь – декабрь 1943 г.) [Combat Composition of the Soviet Army, Part III (January–December 1943)] (PDF) (in Russian). Moscow: Voenizdat.
- Gurkin, V.V.; et al. (1988). Боевой состав Советской армии: Часть IV (Январь – декабрь 1944 г.) [Combat Composition of the Soviet Army, Part IV (January–December 1944)] (PDF) (in Russian). Moscow: Voenizdat.
- Gurkin, V.V.; et al. (1990). Боевой состав Советской армии: Часть V (Январь–сентябрь 1945 г.) [Combat Composition of the Soviet Army, Part V (January–September 1945)] (PDF) (in Russian). Moscow: Voenizdat.
- Kuzelenkov, V.N., ed. (2005). Командный и начальствующий состав Красной Армии в 1940–1941 гг [Commanders and Command Staff of the Red Army 1940–1941] (in Russian). Moscow/St. Petersburg: Letny sad. ISBN 5-94381-137-0.
- Mozhayev, Major General Semyon (1945). "Журнал боевых действий 2 А против Японо-Маньчжурских войск в период 9–20.8.45 г." [Combat Journal of the 2nd Army against the Japanese-Manchurian troops in the period 9–20 August 1945]. Pamyat Naroda (in Russian). Ministry of Defense of the Russian Federation. Archived from the original on 6 January 2018. (Central Archives of the Russian Ministry of Defence, fond 304, opus 7008, file 76)
