= 384th Rifle Division =

- Active: 1941 - 1946
- Country: Soviet Union
- Branch: Red Army
- Type: Division
- Role: Infantry
- Engagements: Demyansk Pocket; Soviet invasion of Manchuria
- Decorations: Order of the Red Banner (2nd Formation)

Commanders
- Notable commanders: Col. Andrei Yakovlevich Mironov; Col. Ivan Danilovich Morozov; Col. Mikhail Emmanulovich Moskalik; Maj. Gen. Pyotr Antonovich Mamaev

The 384th Rifle Division was raised in 1941 as an infantry division of the Red Army, and served twice during the Great Patriotic War in that role. It was first formed on August 10 in the Siberian Military District. It joined the fighting front in February, 1942 with the 11th Army in the fighting north of the German force that was encircled at Demyansk. The division continued to take part in several savage battles in this area into the summer and autumn of that year, gradually being worn down in this attritional struggle on a secondary front until it was disbanded in December to provide replacements for other units. In the buildup to the Soviet invasion of Manchuria a new 384th was formed in the Far Eastern Front in late 1944. The new division fought with enough distinction that it was awarded the Order of the Red Banner, and continued to serve briefly into the postwar period.

== 1st Formation ==
The 384th began forming on August 10, 1941 at Omsk in the Siberian Military District, based on an RKO order of that date that included the 372nd, 374th, 376th, 378th, 380th and 382nd Rifle Divisions. Its order of battle, based on the first wartime shtat (table of organization and equipment) for rifle divisions, was as follows:

- 1272nd Rifle Regiment
- 1274th Rifle Regiment
- 1276th Rifle Regiment
- 947th Artillery Regiment
- 402nd Antitank Battalion
- 227th Antiaircraft Battery (later 671st Antiaircraft Battalion)
- 446th Reconnaissance Company
- 664th Sapper Battalion
- 835th Signal Battalion (later 315th Signal Company)
- 469th Medical/Sanitation Battalion
- 462nd Chemical Protection (Anti-gas) Company
- 499th Motor Transport Company
- 238th Field Bakery
- 807th Divisional Veterinary Hospital
- 1432nd Field Postal Station
- 755th Field Office of the State Bank

Col. Andrei Yakovlevich Mironov was assigned to command of the division on August 23, but he would only remain in command until November 1, when he was succeeded by Col. Ivan Danilovich Morozov. In that month the division was assigned to the 58th Reserve Army, still in the Siberian District. On January 13, 1942, Colonel Morozov was in turn succeeded by Col. Mikhail Emmanulovich Moskalik, who would finally lead the division to the fighting front in February when it was assigned to the 11th Army in Northwestern Front. The 384th would remain in this Front for the duration of its 1st formation, and Colonel Moskalik would remain as its commander through this period as well.

=== Battles for Demyansk ===
When the 384th arrived at the front, 11th Army was holding positions generally north of the encircled enemy forces. On March 21 the German X Army Corps began an offensive to open a land corridor into the Demyansk pocket, held by the II Army Corps. As the X Corps approached the Lovat River in mid-April, the 384th was one of three divisions sent forward from the Pola River to prevent a breakthrough. By April 21 the combined German attack from within and outside managed to drive a narrow route (the Ramushevo Corridor) to partly relieve II Corps; from May to November Northwestern Front staged repeated efforts to cut this lifeline.

The first such effort came on May 3, when 11th Army attacked the north side of the corridor while 1st Shock Army attacked the south side. The Soviet forces continued to attack for two weeks but could not cut the 4 km-wide corridor, although their artillery fire prevented German supply convoys from using the road most of the time. Later in the month the 384th was transferred to the 27th Army, where it remained into July, when it was moved to the Front reserves. It returned to 11th Army in August, and took part in a new offensive to cut the corridor beginning on the 10th, but after a week the attacking groups had gained no more than a few hundred metres. German minefields inflicted heavy casualties and the offensive had to be halted on August 21 due to losses and ammunition shortages. A further assault in September fared much the same. Marshal S. K. Timoshenko had been appointed to oversee Northwestern Front's operations in July and on October 18 he reported to the STAVKA on his plan for a new offensive in November:

"The 11th Army's primary mission is to destroy the enemy in the sector between the Pola and Polomet Rivers by an attack from the Strelitsy, Gorby, Viazovka and Dedno (inclusive) line with the forces on the army's left wing and, after reaching the Rosino, Maslino, Kostkovo and Solovevo front on the northern and western banks of these rivers, complete the encirclement of the enemy's Demyansk grouping in close coordination with forces on the 1st Shock Army's right wing, which will be attacking from the south."

The 384th is specified in this plan as one of the two rifle divisions to be employed by 11th Army, along with three rifle brigades and a tank brigade. A prolonged thaw developed in November which delayed the regrouping and the actual offensive, which finally began early on November 28 and faltered almost immediately after it began.

Since at this time Red Army reserves were going to the higher priority offensives at Rzhev and Stalingrad, as well as the upcoming Operation Iskra to relieve Leningrad, Northwestern Front had to rely on its own resources to sustain its attacks, so on December 10 the worn-down 384th was officially disbanded to provide replacements for the remaining divisions. Colonel Moskalik was moved to command of the 200th Rifle Division.

== 2nd Formation ==
After an absence of nearly two years from the Red Army order of battle, much like the 386th Rifle Division, a new 384th was formed on November 8, 1944 in the 39th Rifle Corps of the 25th Army of the Far Eastern Front. It had a substantially different order of battle from the 1st formation:

- 535th Rifle Regiment
- 547th Rifle Regiment
- 627th Rifle Regiment
- 841st Artillery Regiment
- 296th Antitank Battalion
- 155th Reconnaissance Company
- 208th Sapper Battalion
- 1035th Signal Company
- 399th Medical/Sanitation Battalion
- 230th Chemical Protection (Anti-gas) Company
- 728th Motor Transport Company
- 610th Field Bakery
- 489th Divisional Veterinary Hospital
- 1432nd Field Postal Station
- 755th Field Office of the State Bank

Maj. Gen. Pyotr Antonovich Mamaev, who had previously commanded the 107th Fortified Region, was appointed to command on the day the division re-formed, and remained in command for the duration.

When the Manchurian operation began on August 9, 1945, the division was still in 39th Corps of 25th Army, which was now part of the 1st Far Eastern Front. 39th Corps moved into its final attack positions as late as possible on the evening of August 8. The Corps had the 40th and 386th Rifle Divisions in the first echelon with the 384th in second. Assault groups were formed from the border guards and fortified region troops who were familiar with the terrain, with one advance battalion from each lead rifle regiment to follow, and the 259th Tank Brigade that would take the lead once a penetration was made. In addition, to maintain surprise there would be no artillery preparation. Light rain began about midnight which would soon intensify; while this hindered movement it also contributed to surprise. By the end of the day the 39th Corps had advanced 10 to 12 km into the Japanese rear on the Pad Sennaya axis and were beginning to fight for the town of Tungning and the vital rail line to Tumen.

Soviet forces continued their advance on August 10 against stiffening Japanese resistance. In the afternoon lead elements of 259th Tanks and 40th Division entered Tungning while the 384th fought to reduce the Tungning Fortified Region. 5th Army's 17th Rifle Corps assisted in this by attacking southward in the rear of the Suifenhe center of resistance, ultimately joining 39th Corps west of Tungning. 17th Corps was then subordinated to 25th Army. Over the following days the two rifle corps with the 10th Mechanized Corps advanced southwestward, sharing a single road along a military rail line against negligible resistance. After reaching Heitosai on the 14th the 39th Corps split off and marched southwestward toward Wangching. At Shihliping the forward detachment and 40th Division engaged elements of the Japanese 1st Mobile Brigade, which was soon driven off. Wangching was taken at 1700 hours on August 15; by this point the remainder of 39th Rifle and 10th Mechanized Corps stretched out along the road for 210 km to the rear. The following day the 257th Tanks and small elements of 39th Corps advanced 20 km towards Tumen, which was secured on August 16, cutting the escape routes of the Japanese 112th and 79th Infantry Divisions. The last organized resistance in the 1st Far Eastern Front sector was snuffed out on August 26. On September 19 the 384th was recognized for its service in the campaign with the award of the Order of the Red Banner.
