= 127th Division (Imperial Japanese Army) =

- 第127師団
- Active: 1945–1945
- Country: Empire of Japan
- Allegiance: 3rd Army
- Branch: Imperial Japanese Army
- Type: Infantry
- Size: 13130
- Garrison/HQ: Helong (Pataohotzu)
- Nickname(s): Eimai division
- Engagements: Soviet invasion of Manchuria

The 127th Division (第127師団, Dai-hyakunijūnana Shidan) was an infantry division of the Imperial Japanese Army. Its call sign was the Eimai Division (英邁兵団, Eimai Heidan). It was formed on 16 January 1945 in Hunchun as a triangular division. It was a part of the eight simultaneously created divisions including the 121st, 122nd, 123rd, 124th, 125th, 126th, 127th and 128th Divisions. The nucleus for the formation was the 9th Border Guards Group and some personnel from the 112th Division.

== History ==
The 127th Division was assigned to the Third Army on 26 February 1945. By the end of March 1945, the 280th and 281st Infantry Regiments were combat ready, and the 282nd Infantry Regiment was formed from a couple of independent infantry battalions diverted from the Fujin City area. In the middle May 1945, the division formation was officially complete. The 127th Division was reinforced by the 2nd Heavy Artillery Regiment and the 2nd Independent Heavy Artillery Battery, both armed with Type 45 240 mm howitzers. In July 1945, the 37th Artillery Regiment and the 127th Airborne Battalion were added.

The 127th Division was used primarily as a labor unit to dig the defenses to be used by the more combat-ready units, therefore it was transferred several times, first from Hunchun to Tumen, Jilin, then to Longjing, Jilin. By 9 August 1945, the divisional headquarters were at Helong (Pataohotzu), while the 281st Infantry Regiment was quartered at Yanji. The majority of the troops were deployed west of the Tumen River. The divisional fortifications were mostly cave-type, and approximately 1/3 complete by 9 August 1945. Combat training was sporadic due to the need for concealment and diversion for labor duties, with reported low self-confidence of the non-commissioned officers by the end of July 1945. The combat efficiency of the 127th Division was estimated to be 20%.

The 127th Division was the first Japanese unit to come under attack by the Red Army during the Soviet invasion of Manchuria. The shelling of the positions of the 280th Infantry Regiment on the north flank of the 127th Division started immediately after midnight 9 August 1945. Immediately afterwards, the Third Army reinforced the 127th Division with the 101st Independent Mixed Regiment. The 280th Infantry Regiment managed to retreat and disengaged on 11 August 1945.

The announcement of the surrender of Japan on 15 August 1945 was dismissed as false by the commanders of the 127th Division. The division participated in preparations for a counterattack to Soviet armor units' breakthrough at Yanji on 15–16 August 1945, but the hostilities ceased before units sent were engaged. The division surrendered on 19 August 1945 while still in their initial defensive positions. The total losses of the 127th Division during the invasion were 853 men, the majority of them forward scouts declared missing in action.

=== Equipment ===
The 127th Division had some shortage of equipment prior to the start of the Soviet invasion of Manchuria.

Weapon	Authorized	Actual
Heavy grenade launchers	108	48
Light machine guns	108	81
Heavy machine guns	24	18
Type 11 37 mm infantry gun	6	6
Type 1 37 mm Anti-Tank Gun	6	6
Type 41/94 75 mm Mountain Gun	4	6
Divisional artillery	36	18 (75 mm field guns); 10 (75 mm mountain guns); 4 (105 mm howitzers)

Lack of anti-tank weapons resulted in the 127th Ordnance Company fabricating improvised explosive devices that were intended to be thrown, out of stock of aerial bombs in Hoeryong stores. Metal-tipped bamboo spears were also manufactured.

The division was supplied with 2 weeks' worth of ammunition, of which 75% was concentrated in the forward positions. Although general supply levels were adequate, automotive fuel and electrical batteries for the radios were in short supply. Also, supply of engineering equipment for digging the fortifications was inadequate despite tools and machinery requisitioned from the local coal mines.

== See also ==
- List of Japanese Infantry Divisions

== Notes and references ==
- This article incorporates material from Japanese Wikipedia page 第127師団 (日本軍), accessed 3 July 2016
- Madej, W. Victor, Japanese Armed Forces Order of Battle, 1937–1945 [2 vols], Allentown, PA: 1981.
