= 120th Division (Imperial Japanese Army) =

- 第120師団
- Active: 1944–1945
- Country: Empire of Japan
- Allegiance: 17th area army
- Branch: Imperial Japanese Army
- Type: Infantry
- Size: 12000
- Garrison/HQ: Gyeongsan
- Nickname: Push forward division
- Engagements: none

The 120th Division (第120師団, Dai-hyakunijū Shidan) was an infantry division of the Imperial Japanese Army. Its call sign was the Push Forward Division (邁進兵団, Maishin Heidan). It was formed 21 November 1944 in Dongning, Heilongjiang as a triangular division. The nucleus for the formation was the leftovers of 12th division . The division was initially assigned to the 3rd army.

== Action ==
Initially the 120th division was tasked with security duties in east Manchukuo. In March 1945, it was reassigned to the 17th area army, and its former positions were taken by 128th division. In May 1945, the headquarters and auxiliary forces were completed transfer in Gyeongsan, 259th infantry regiment - in Busan, 260th infantry regiment - in Daegu, 261st infantry regiment - in Goseong and Sacheon. Although the 261st infantry regiment was moved to Pyongyang (from where it was expected to be sent to Jejudo) during the Soviet invasion of Manchuria since 9 August 1945, the hostilities ended before the 120th division has seen any combat.

The 261st infantry regiment was taken prisoner by the Red Army and locked in labour camp in Soviet Union since July 1946 together with some smaller detachments of the 120th division. The rest of the division have returned to Japan via Sasebo, Nagasaki and dissolved 25 October 1945.

== See also ==
- List of Japanese Infantry Divisions

== Notes and references ==
- This article incorporates material from Japanese Wikipedia page 第120師団 (日本軍), accessed 28 June 2016
- Madej, W. Victor, Japanese Armed Forces Order of Battle, 1937–1945 [2 vols], Allentown, PA: 1981.
