= 132nd Independent Mixed Brigade =

- 独立混成第132旅団
- Active: 1945–1945
- Country: Empire of Japan
- Allegiance: 3rd army
- Branch: Imperial Japanese Army
- Type: Infantry
- Size: 5545
- Garrison/HQ: Dongning, Heilongjiang
- Nickname: Funsen brigade
- Engagements: Soviet invasion of Manchuria

The 132nd independent mixed brigade (独立混成第132旅団, Dokuritsu konsei dai hyakusanjūni ryodan) was an infantry brigade of the Imperial Japanese Army. It was formed 10 July 1945 in Dongning, Heilongjiang for border guard duties.

== Assignments ==
30 July 1945, the 132nd brigade was assigned to the 3rd army.

The 132nd brigade was reinforced by the 1st independent border guards unit and in turn assigned to 128th division with the start of the Soviet invasion of Manchuria 9 August 1945. Therefore, the top-level assignment of the 132nd brigade has changed to the 1st area army.

== Action ==
On 9 August 1945, the Tungning detachment of the 132nd brigade beat off a direct Soviet attack at Dongning. Nonetheless, the rest of brigade was ordered to withdraw in the evening of the same day, with the left-behind forces outflanked and routed on 11 August 1945.

After retreating to Tachienchang, the 132nd brigade was merged with the remnants of the 284th infantry regiment from the 128th division to form a "Tachienchang detachment". It held its positions against some Red Army armoured units until 16 August 1945 before surrendering following the surrender of Japan.
