= 121st Division (Imperial Japanese Army) =

- 第121師団
- Active: 1945–1945
- Country: Empire of Japan
- Allegiance: 58th army
- Branch: Imperial Japanese Army
- Type: Infantry
- Size: 13000
- Garrison/HQ: Jejudo
- Nickname: Glory division
- Engagements: none

The 121st Division (第121師団, Dai-hyakunijūichi Shidan) was an infantry division of the Imperial Japanese Army. Its call sign was the Glory Division (栄光兵団, Eikō Heidan). It was formed 16 January in Tianjin as a triangular division. It was a part of the 8 simultaneously created divisions batch comprising 121st, 122nd, 123rd, 124th, 125th, 126th, 127th and 128th divisions. The nucleus for the formation was the 3rd Cavalry Brigade and the leftovers of 28th division. The division was initially assigned to the 3rd army.

== Action ==
30 March 1945 the 121st division formation was complete and it was assigned to the 58th army. The division travelled overland to south Korea and was transferred to Jejudo island in June 1945. The 121st division was still building a defenses on the eastern part of the island by the time of the surrender of Japan 15 August 1945.

The 121st division has returned to Japan via Sasebo, Nagasaki in October–November 1945 and dissolved soon afterwards.

== See also ==
- List of Japanese Infantry Divisions

== Notes and references ==
- This article incorporates material from Japanese Wikipedia page 第121師団 (日本軍), accessed 28 June 2016
- Madej, W. Victor, Japanese Armed Forces Order of Battle, 1937–1945 [2 vols], Allentown, PA: 1981.
