= 128th Division (Imperial Japanese Army) =

- 第128師団
- Active: 1945–1945
- Country: Empire of Japan
- Allegiance: 3rd army
- Branch: Imperial Japanese Army
- Type: Infantry
- Size: 12634
- Garrison/HQ: Luozigou
- Nickname: Eimai division
- Engagements: Soviet invasion of Manchuria

The 128th Division (第128師団, Dai-hyakunijūhachi Shidan) was an infantry division of the Imperial Japanese Army. Its call sign was the Eibu Division (英武兵団, Eibu Heidan). It was formed 16 January 1945 in Mudanjiang as a triangular division. It was a part of the 8 simultaneously created divisions batch comprising 121st, 122nd, 123rd, 124th, 125th, 126th, 127th and 128th divisions. The nucleus for the formation were the 1st, 2nd, and parts of 11th border guards group.

== Action ==
Initially, the 128th division was assigned to the 3rd army. The 128th division headquarters were established in March 1945 at Luozigou (Lotzukou), replacing the 120th division transferred to the south of Korea. The division combat efficiency was estimated to be 20%.

Immediately after the start of the Soviet invasion of Manchuria 9 August 1945 the 128th division was subordinated directly to 1st area army as planned. At the same time, 132nd Independent Mixed Brigade was attached to the division.

Initial Soviet attack was parred by 132nd Independent Mixed Brigade at Dongning, Heilongjiang, but 11 August 1945 the Red Army column outflanked Dongning defenders from the south and penetrated deeply into Japanese-held territory. In the evening 12 August 1945, the 128th division fell back to the second line of defenses around Huadian, Jilin where it stayed until surrender of Japan news reached units 16 August 1945.

Although the estimated number of soldiers of 128th division killed in action during the Soviet invasion of Manchuria was only 1095 men, the 128th division was severely disorganized, retaining only half of combat efficiency after the brief conflict.

Majority of the troops of the division were taken prisoner by the Red Army and were taken to Siberian labour camps in September - October 1945.

== See also ==
- List of Japanese Infantry Divisions
- Independent Mixed Brigades (Imperial Japanese Army)

== Notes and references ==
- This article incorporates material from Japanese Wikipedia page 第128師団 (日本軍), accessed 4 July 2016
- Madej, W. Victor, Japanese Armed Forces Order of Battle, 1937–1945 [2 vols], Allentown, PA: 1981.
