= 137th Division (Imperial Japanese Army) =

- 第137師団
- Active: 1945–1945
- Country: Empire of Japan
- Allegiance: 34th army
- Branch: Imperial Japanese Army
- Type: Infantry
- Size: 10000
- Garrison/HQ: North Hamgyong Province
- Nickname: Fuyoku division
- Engagements: none

The 137th Division (第137師団, Dai-hyakusanjūnana Shidan) was an infantry division of the Imperial Japanese Army. Its call sign was the Fuyoku Division (扶翼兵団, Fuyoku Heidan). It was formed 10 July 1945 in North Hamgyong Province as a triangular division. It was a part of the 8 simultaneously created divisions batch comprising 134th, 135th, 136th, 137th, 138th, 139th, 148th and 149th divisions. The nucleus for the formation was the small parts detached from the 79th division.

== Action ==
The 137th division was assigned to the 34th army 30 July 1945. Due to the lack of officers, many were either ill or senile, raising concerns related to a lot of soldiers drafted from the Korea. Also, the 137th division have suffered from the severe lack of equipment, with only rifles and machine guns available in any numbers. The division has absolutely no artillery pieces, although several were en route. Even wood-cutting implements for camping and fortification were in short supply, with one axe per company and a one saw per battalion. Anti-tank explosive charges were also in the short supply. Also, the entire division had only three trucks, making division to balance on the verge of the starvation due supply problems. 15 August 1945, the division has only food worth for two days. Also, the division have not enough telephone wire to connect with all sub-units, therefore resorting to visual communications.

During the Soviet invasion of Manchuria, the 137th division was deployed together with the 59th division south-west of Hamhung.

The division was reassigned to 17th area army and transferred to Pyongyang after the surrender of Japan 15 August 1945, where it was disarmed by the Soviet Union forces.

== See also ==
- List of Japanese Infantry Divisions

== Notes and references ==
- This article incorporates material from Japanese Wikipedia page 第137師団 (日本軍), accessed 8 July 2016
- Madej, W. Victor, Japanese Armed Forces Order of Battle, 1937–1945 [2 vols], Allentown, PA: 1981.
