= 34th Rifle Division =

Red Army unit in WWII

- Active: 1923–1948
- Country: Soviet Union
- Branch: Red Army
- Type: Infantry
- Size: Division
- Garrison/HQ: Samara (as territorial division)
- Engagements: World War II; Invasion of Manchuria
- Decorations: Order of the Red Banner
- Honorifics: Middle Volga; Named for Valerian Kuybyshev

The 34th Rifle Division (Russian: 34-я стрелковая дивизия) was an infantry division of the Red Army during and before World War II. The division was formed in 1923. It fought in the Soviet invasion of Manchuria in August 1945. Postwar, it became the 11th Machine Gun Artillery Division.

== History ==
=== Before 1941 ===
The 34th was originally formed as a territorial division of the Volga Military District in accordance with orders of 14 and 23 September 1923, from the cadre of the mobilization unit colocated with the 33rd Samara Rifle Division. Headquartered at Samara, the division included the 100th, 101st, and 102nd Rifle Regiments, stationed at Ufa, Syzran, and Samara, respectively, in addition to light artillery and howitzer battalions and sapper and communications companies. Its anniversary was celebrated on 8 November. The artillery units of the division were merged to form the 34th Artillery Regiment on 20 October 1924. As a territorial unit, the permanent cadre of the division conducted pre-conscription training camps in the northern hemisphere winter, three-month summer training camps for new conscripts, and fifteen-day combined arms training camps for older conscripts every year since 1924. The conscripts assigned to the 34th were drawn from Samara Governorate.

It was given the honorific Middle Volga on 10 July 1930. In March 1934, it attained Cadre status and was transferred to Far East, joining the Special Red Banner Far Eastern Army (OKDVA) in April. On 10 June 1935, it received the honorific named for Valerian Kuybyshev. At this point it was assigned to the 18th Rifle Corps of the OKDVA with its headquarters and 102nd Rifle Regiment at Birobidzhan, while the 100th Rifle Regiment and 34th Artillery Regiment were at Babstovo and the 101st Syzran Rifle Regiment was at Novy. On 1 July 1938 the OKDVA was broken up and the division became part of the 2nd Army, which became the 2nd Red Banner Army on 4 September of that year. On 1 July 1940 it became part of the newly formed 15th Army when the 2nd Red Banner Army was split.

=== World War II ===
==== Garrison duty in the Far East ====
It was part of the 15th Army and the 18th Rifle Corps on 22 June 1941. 260th Rifle Brigade commander Colonel Ignat Vetvitsky became acting division commander in late April, and turned over command to Colonel Stepan Kolomiets, a recent graduate of a course at the Higher Military Academy, in mid-December 1943. Kolomiets was promoted to major general on 13 September 1944, but was relieved of command on 16 July 1945 for "indecisiveness in restoring discipline to units of the division." He was replaced by 3rd Rifle Division commander Major General Pavel Dyomin, who led the division during the Soviet invasion of Manchuria.

==== Soviet invasion of Manchuria ====
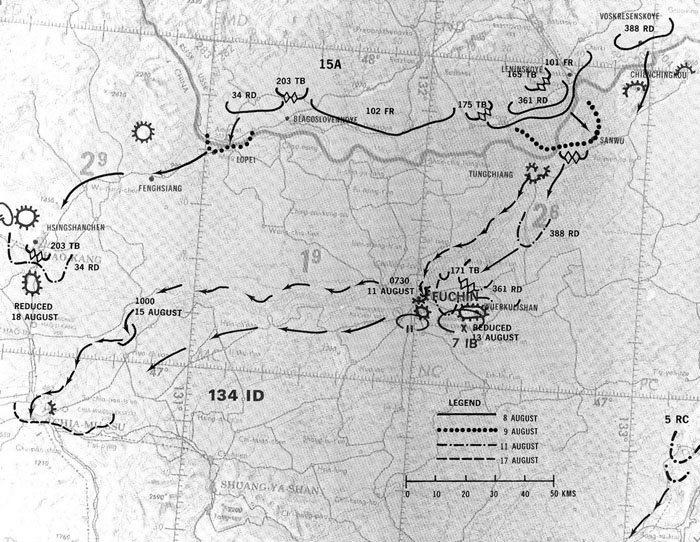
Operations of the 15th Army in the Soviet invasion of Manchuria, 9–17 August 1945

In the Soviet invasion of Manchuria, the division participated in the attack across the Amur River conducted by the 2nd Far Eastern Front, known in Soviet historiography as the Sungari Offensive. The 15th Army was tasked with making the main attack of the front with its three forward rifle divisions: the 34th, 361st and 388th. With the 203rd Tank Brigade, the 34th was positioned near Blagoslovennoye, tasked with launching the rightmost of the three attacks of the 15th Army. The 34th and the 203rd Tank Brigade were to cross the Amur, capturing Luobei and the Japanese Xingshanzhen fortified region before linking up with the 361st and 388th Divisions at Jiamusi on the Sungari River. The Soviet forces faced the Japanese 14th Border Guards Unit at Xingshanzhen and the 134th Infantry Division at Jiamusi.

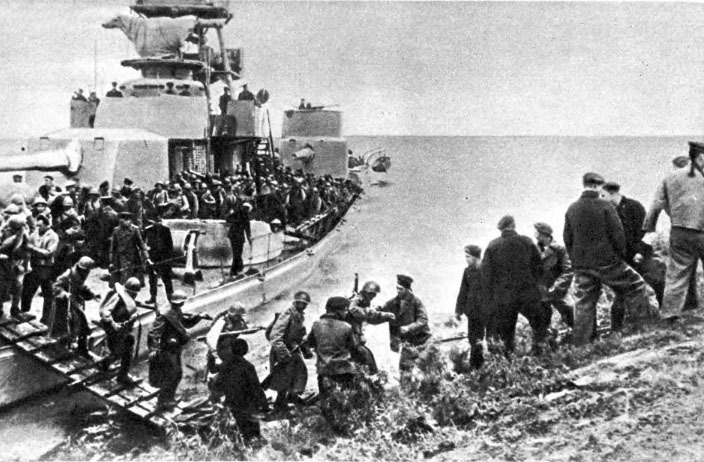
Soviet troops of the 15th Army crossing the Sungari aboard a monitor of the Amur Flotilla during the Sungari Offensive

Operations began at 01:00 on 9 August, when the divisions of the 15th Army sent reconnaissance detachments and advanced battalions to capture major islands in the Amur. These were captured and in the predawn hours, reconnaissance parties crossed to the southern bank of the river. During the day positions on the islands and on the southern bank were consolidated, as main forces concentrated to cross the Amur in force. The operations were hindered by heavy rains, high water, and mud. On the night of 9–10 August, the divisions of the 15th Army conducted reconnaissance-in-force on Japanese strongpoints on the south bank, and late on 10 August an advanced regiment from the 34th captured the village of Lopei, reconnoitering strongpoints to the south.

The main force of the division and the 203rd Tank Brigade crossed the river at Lopei around this time, and advanced to the south after bypassing the Xingshanzhen fortified region, leaving a small detachment behind to reduce it. The fortified region fell within three days after artillery bombardment and airstrikes forced the Japanese to retreat either towards Jiamusi or the mountains west of Xingshanzhen. The advance of the division towards Jiamusi was stymied by formidable Japanese opposition south of Xingshanzhen, which was outflanked by a 14 August amphibious landing of the 83rd Rifle Regiment of the 34th and another regiment from the 361st Division by ships of the Amur Flotilla near Huachuan on the Sungari, 40 kilometers (25 mi) north of Jiamusi. This movement forced the Japanese defenders to retreat to Jiamusi. The latter was captured by the 361st and 388th on 17 August, after which the 15th Army continued to pursue the retreating Japanese until 21 August.

=== Postwar ===
It became part of the 5th Rifle Corps from 3 September 1945. For its combat service, it was awarded the Order of the Red Banner on 14 September 1945. In the fall of 1945, the division became part of the Transbaikal-Amur Military District at Vyazemsky. The division was transferred to the Far Eastern Military District and was commanded by Dyomin until around March 1947. It became the 11th Machine Gun Artillery Division in 1948.

== Commanders ==
The following officers commanded the division.

- Semyon Avvakumovich Spilnichenko (1925)
- Mikhail Khozin (1926–1932)
- Komdiv Vilyam Rokhi (1932–1937) - arrested and shot during the Great Purge
- Colonel Alexey Ivanovich Prilepsky (26 March 1941 – 7 February 1942)
- Major General Nikolai Alekseevich Kichaev (8 February 1942 – 27 April 1943)
- Colonel Ignat Vetvitsky (28 April–14 December 1943)
- Colonel Stepan Kolomiets (15 December 1943 – 16 July 1945; promoted to Major General 13 September 1944)
- Major General Pavel Dyomin (July 1945 – c. March 1947)

== Composition ==
The division included the following units during World War II.

- 83rd Rifle Regiment
- 134th Rifle Regiment
- 327th Rifle Regiment
- 63rd Artillery Regiment
- 145th Howitzer Artillery Regiment
- 75th Separate Antitank Artillery Battalion
- 478th Separate Antiaircraft Artillery Battalion
- 7th Reconnaissance Company
- 59th Sapper Battalion
- 89th Separate Signals Battalion
- 12th Medical Battalion
- 14th Separate Chemical Defense Company
- 9th Repair and Reconstruction Company
- 58th Auto Transport Company
- 102nd Field Bakery
- 62nd Divisional Artillery Workshop Battalion
- 33rd Field Mobile Hospital
- 217th Veterinary Field Hospital
- 69th Field Postal Station
- 265th Field Cash Office of the State Bank
