= 126th Division (Imperial Japanese Army) =

- 第126師団
- Active: 1945–1945
- Country: Empire of Japan
- Allegiance: 5th army
- Branch: Imperial Japanese Army
- Type: Infantry
- Size: 19000
- Garrison/HQ: Mishan
- Nickname(s): Resolution division
- Engagements: Soviet invasion of Manchuria

The 126th Division (第126師団, Dai-hyakunijūroku Shidan) was an infantry division of the Imperial Japanese Army. Its call sign was the Resolution Division (英断兵団, Eidan Heidan). It was formed 16 January in Mishan as a triangular division. It was a part of the 8 simultaneously created divisions batch comprising 121st, 122nd, 123rd, 124th, 125th, 126th, 127th and 128th divisions. The nucleus for the formation was the 12th border guards group in Miaoling fortress, Mizuki fortress garrisoned by parts of the 11th independent border guards group, parts of 3rd cavalry brigade and left-behind elements of the 25th Division. The 126th division was permanently assigned to 5th army.

== Action ==
In July 1945, the division was brought to the nearly full strength, expanding artillery company to 126th artillery regiment and adding 126th Airborne (Assault) battalion, expanding by 9 August 1945 from 12500 to 19000 men in ranks. Nothetheless, the artillery was understrength. Artillery regiment has just 21 Type 38 10 cm Cannons, while infantry regiments has only half the required complement of the Infantry support guns. Also, the lack of machine guns, ammunition, and low quality of personnel led the Kwantung Army command to estimate the 126th division being only 20% combat effective.

The 126th division was tasked with protecting a border of Mudanjiang from 9 June 1945.

9 August 1945, at the start of the Soviet invasion of Manchuria the 126th division was standing against 6 rifle divisions and 3 armoured brigades of the Red Army. On the retreat to the Linkou County, parts of the 126th artillery regiment were involved in the Asayama incident - a forced suicide of the Japanese refugees, resulting in 1300 civilian deaths.

The division has stopped at Mudanjiang together with the 135th division and set up a defensive lines, after being reinforced by 31st independent anti-tank battalion, 18th engineer regiment and 2nd company of the 20th heavy artillery regiment. The massed Red Army attack has started 14 August 1945, but the 126th division held the defences until 16 August 1945, buying time for population of Mudanjiang to flee. As the result of heavy Japanese resistance, Soviet forces have stopped the attempts to storm the Mudanjiang and bypassed the city on the southern flank.

The 126th division has surrendered to the Red Army 17 August 1945 and was disarmed 18 August 1945. Most of personnel was taken prisoner by the Soviet Union. About 4000 men have died either during fighting or in the Siberian labour camps.

== See also ==
- List of Japanese Infantry Divisions

== Notes and references ==
- This article incorporates material from Japanese Wikipedia page 第126師団 (日本軍), accessed 2 July 2016
- Madej, W. Victor, Japanese Armed Forces Order of Battle, 1937–1945 [2 vols], Allentown, PA: 1981.
