= Makar Teryokhin =

Soviet army lieutenant general

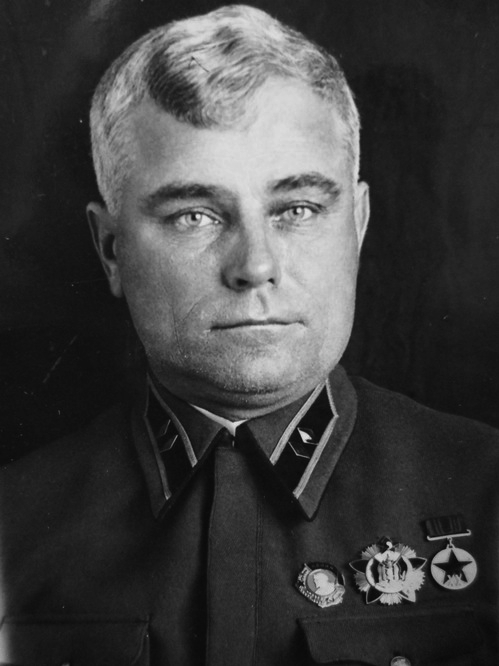
- Native name: Макар Фомич Терёхин
- Born: 17 March 1896; Polyany, Ryazansky Uyezd, Ryazan Governorate, Russian Empire
- Died: 30 March 1967 (aged 71) Ryazan, Soviet Union
- Allegiance: Russian Empire; Soviet Union
- Branch: Imperial Russian Army; Red Army (later Soviet Army)
- Service years: 1915–1917; 1918–1954
- Rank: Lieutenant general
- Commands: 20th Tank Corps; 19th Rifle Corps; 5th Mechanized Corps; 2nd Red Banner Army
- Conflicts: World War I; Russian Civil War; Spanish Civil War; Battles of Khalkhin Gol; World War II
- Awards: Hero of the Soviet Union; Order of Lenin (3); Order of the Red Banner (2); Order of Kutuzov, 1st class

Makar Fomich Teryokhin (Russian: Мака́р Фоми́ч Терёхин; 17 March [O.S. 5 March] 1896 – 30 March 1967) was a Soviet Army lieutenant general and a Hero of the Soviet Union.

Teryokhin became a non-commissioned officer in the Imperial Russian Army during World War I, then joined the Red Army during the Russian Civil War, becoming a platoon commander. He commanded companies and battalions during the interwar period and became a battalion, regiment and brigade commander in the Red Army's new mechanized forces. After serving in the Spanish Civil War as a Soviet advisor, Teryokhin commanded the 20th Tank Corps during the Battles of Khalkhin Gol in mid-1939 and was awarded the title Hero of the Soviet Union for his leadership. He commanded the 19th Rifle Corps during the Winter War, then returned to the Far East to command the 5th Mechanized Corps. During World War II he remained in the Far East, commanding the 2nd Red Banner Army. Teryokhin commanded the army during the Soviet invasion of Manchuria during August and September 1945. Postwar, he was a corps commander and assistant commander of two military districts before his retirement.

== Early life, World War I, and Russian Civil War ==
Teryokhin was born on 17 March 1896 in the village of Polyany in Ryazan Governorate to a peasant family. He graduated from seven grades, working as a shepherd and in a starch plant during his childhood and adolescence. In the winter he studied at a rural school, from which he graduated in 1910. From August 1915 he served in the Imperial Russian Army as a Ryadovoy and an Unteroffizier. Teryokhin was sent into combat in March 1917 in the Baltic, and reached the rank of Senior Unteroffizier before the Imperial Russian Army disintegrated following the Russian Revolution. He joined the Red Army in August 1918 and fought in the Russian Civil War. Teryokhin became a member of the Russian Communist Party (Bolshevik) in 1919. He successively served as a platoon instructor in a volost vsevobuch department, the armourer of a Cheka battalion in Kaluga, and a platoon commander, fighting against the Mamontov Raid, the Revolutionary Insurrectionary Army of Ukraine and the Tambov Rebellion. In 1920, he graduated from the Ryazan Infantry Courses.

== Interwar period ==
Teryokhin became commissar of the Kursk Military School in June 1921, and in October transferred to command a company of the 91st Preparatory Courses. He became a company commander in the 27th Oryol Rifle Regiment in December and became a battalion commander of the regiment in 1922. Teryokhin transferred to command a reconnaissance company in the 50th Rifle Regiment in May 1924 and became head of the regimental school in April 1926 after graduating from the Vystrel commander's improvement courses in 1925. In September 1927, he became a company commander in the 1st Moscow Rifle Division's 3rd Rifle Regiment. In November, Teryokhin transferred to become a training company commander at the Nizhny Novgorod Infantry School. He graduated from the Vystrel courses again in 1931 and became a battalion commander at the Nizhny Novgorod Infantry School in November 1931; he took command of a training battalion at the school, which had been converted into a tank school, in March 1932. Teryokhin graduated from the Leningrad Armored Refresher Courses for Red Army commanders later that year and Officers Technical Improvement Academic Courses at the Military Academy of Motorization and Mechanization in 1935. In March of that year he took command of the 11th Cavalry Division's 10th Mechanized Regiment in the North Caucasus Military District, and was promoted to major in 1936. Teryokhin became commander of the 10th Mechanized Brigade in July 1937.

Between 1937 and 1938, Teryokhin served as a Soviet military adviser to the Spanish Republican Army during the Spanish Civil War. In March 1939, after returning from Spain, he was appointed commander of the 20th Tank Corps in the Transbaikal Military District. From 9 August to 16 September he led elements of the corps as part of the 1st Army Group in the Battles of Khalkhin Gol. He also commanded all armored troops of the 1st Army Group. Teryokhin's tanks captured the heavily fortified heights of Palets, Zelenaya, and Remizov, destroying Japanese bunkers in fighting between 22 and 23 August. For his "skillful leadership and heroism", Teryokhin received the title Hero of the Soviet Union and the Order of Lenin on 18 November. On 29 November he was promoted to Komdiv, skipping the rank of Kombrig. He continued to command the corps in Mongolia until December. On 3 March 1940, he took command of the 19th Rifle Corps, leading it in the final stages of the Winter War. On 4 June Teryokhin was promoted to Lieutenant General of Tank Troops, and in the same month he became commander of the 5th Mechanized Corps in the Transbaikal Military District. Teryokhin graduated from Courses of Improvement for Higher Officers (KUVNAS) at the Military Academy of the General Staff in 1941, and on 11 March of that year took command of the 2nd Red Banner Army of the Far Eastern Front.

== World War II ==
For the duration of World War II, Teryokhin remained in the Far East, commanding the 2nd Red Banner Army, which guarded the Manchurian border. It also formed units that were sent to the front. In early August 1945, it was transferred to the 2nd Far Eastern Front. He led the army during the Soviet invasion of Manchuria, which began on 9 August. Forward detachments from the army crossed the Amur on 9 and 10 August, capturing three bridgeheads. On 11 August, the army began crossing the Amur with assistance from the Amur Military Flotilla, and attacked the Japanese fortifications on the opposite bank. It fought in heavy fighting for the fortified regions of Sakhalian, Aihun, and Sunwu. On 17 August the Japanese troops surrendered, and around 17,000 men of the Japanese 123rd Infantry Division were captured. In the surrender ceremony, Japanese Lieutenant General Kitazawa Teijiro handed over his samurai sword to Teryokhin. After breaking through, the army crossed the Lesser Khingan and advanced to Qiqihar, where it linked up with the Transbaikal Front on 21 August, surrounding the Japanese Fourth Army. For his leadership, Teryokhin was awarded the Order of Kutuzov, 1st class on 8 September 1945.

== Postwar ==
Postwar, Teryokhin commanded the army until December 1945, then became commander of the 36th Guards Rifle Corps from July 1946 to 20 May 1948. In 1949, he graduated from Higher Academic Courses at the Higher Military Academy (formerly the Military Academy of the General Staff), after which he became assistant commander of the troops of the Belomorsky Military District and then the Northern Military District. Teryokhin retired in August 1954 and moved to Ryazan, where he died on 30 March 1967. He was buried at the city's Skorbyashchensky Cemetery.

A street in Polyana was named for Teryokhin.

== Awards ==
Teryokhin received the following awards and decorations:

- Hero of the Soviet Union
- Order of Lenin (3)
- Order of the Red Banner (2)
- Order of Kutuzov, 1st class
- Order of the Red Banner (Mongolian People's Republic) (1939)
