= 125th Division (Imperial Japanese Army) =

- 第125師団
- Active: 1945
- Country: Empire of Japan
- Allegiance: 30th Army
- Branch: Imperial Japanese Army
- Type: Infantry
- Size: 10,000
- Garrison/HQ: Heihe
- Nickname(s): Eiki division
- Engagements: Soviet invasion of Manchuria

The 125th Division (第125師団, Dai-hyakunijūgo Shidan) was an infantry division of the Imperial Japanese Army. Its call sign was the Eiki Division (英機兵団, Eiki Heidan). It was formed 16 January in Heihe as a binary division, later upgraded to triangular division. It was a part of a batch of eight simultaneously created divisions: the 121st, 122nd, 123rd, 124th, 125th, 126th, 127th and 128th Divisions. The nucleus for the formation was the remnants of the transferred 57th Division plus the 7th and 13th Independent Border Guards units.

== History ==
The 125th Division formation was complete in February 1945 and was initially assigned to the 4th Army. In June 1945, the division was sent to Tonghua, Jilin. In July 1945, the 274th Infantry Regiment, a divisional artillery company, a transport company, an ordnance company and a veterinary department were sent to Harbin to become the nucleus of the 149th Division. At the news of the Soviet invasion of Manchuria 9 August 1945 the 125th Division was reassigned to the 30th Army.

In early August 1945, the 125th division was reinforced by 134th Independent Mixed Brigade.

9-11 August 1945, the division has received contradictory orders, and did not move. The 125th Division was still building a fortifications at Tonghua at the time of the surrender of Japan. The division has surrendered to the Red Army 24 August 1945 and was completely disarmed 26 August 1945. Although parts of the division were taken prisoner by Soviet forces in September - October 1945, still a lot of personnel remained in Tonghua, until about 3000 Japanese soldiers and civilians either died in fighting or were summarily executed in the Tonghua Incident on 3 February 1946. This was an attempted Japanese rebellion with the goal of rescuing Empress Wanrong from the Eighth Route Army.

== See also ==
- List of Japanese Infantry Divisions
- Independent Mixed Brigades (Imperial Japanese Army)

== Notes and references ==
- This article incorporates material from Japanese Wikipedia page 第125師団 (日本軍), accessed 28 June 2016
- Madej, W. Victor, Japanese Armed Forces Order of Battle, 1937–1945 [2 vols], Allentown, PA: 1981.
