= 138th Division (Imperial Japanese Army) =

- 第138師団
- Active: 1945–1945
- Country: Empire of Japan
- Allegiance: 30th army
- Branch: Imperial Japanese Army
- Type: Infantry
- Size: 2000 or 8810
- Garrison/HQ: Jilin
- Nickname: Immovable division
- Engagements: none

The 138th Division (第138師団, Dai-hyakusanjūhachi Shidan) was an infantry division of the Imperial Japanese Army. Its call sign was the Immovable Division (不動兵団, Fudō Heidan). It was formed 10 July 1945 in several towns along Jilin - Shenyang railroad as a triangular division. It was a part of the 8 simultaneously created divisions batch comprising 134th, 135th, 136th, 137th, 138th, 139th, 148th and 149th divisions. The nucleus for the formation was the small parts detached from the 1st mobile brigade.

== Action ==
30 July 1945, the 138th division was assigned to the 30th army. It was nearly unarmed until the end of July 1945, besides the small arms brought by the men transferred from the other units. Even the rifles were issued only shortly before the surrender of Japan. The division was coherent enough to have the first task (the construction of fortifications) issued only by 6 August 1945. Also, the divisional commander did not arrive until 10 August 1945.

At the beginning of Soviet invasion of Manchuria 9 August 1945, the 138th division was ordered to Fushun. The division was immediately reassigned to the 3rd area army. The division arrived to Fushun 12 August 1945. It was disarmed by Red Army 19 August 1945 in the aftermath of the surrender of Japan.

== See also ==
- List of Japanese Infantry Divisions

== Notes and references ==
- This article incorporates material from Japanese Wikipedia page 第138師団 (日本軍), accessed 8 July 2016
- Madej, W. Victor, Japanese Armed Forces Order of Battle, 1937–1945 [2 vols], Allentown, PA: 1981.
