= 124th Division (Imperial Japanese Army) =

- 第124師団
- Active: 1945–1945
- Country: Empire of Japan
- Allegiance: 5th army
- Branch: Imperial Japanese Army
- Type: Infantry
- Size: 12500
- Garrison/HQ: Mudanjiang
- Nickname: Foresight division
- Engagements: Soviet invasion of Manchuria: Battle of Mutanchiang

The 124th Division (第124師団, Dai-hyakunijūyon Shidan) was an infantry division of the Imperial Japanese Army. Its call sign was the Foresight Division (遠謀兵団, Enbo Heidan). It was formed 16 January in Mudanjiang as a triangular division. It was a part of the 8 simultaneously created divisions batch comprising 121st, 122nd, 123rd, 124th, 125th, 126th, 127th and 128th divisions. The nucleus for the formation was the 1st, 2nd, 11th border guards groups and the parts of the 111th Division. The 124th division was initially assigned to 3rd army.

== Action ==
In March 1945, the 124th division was reassigned to the 5th army and took the positions of the 111th division which was being transferred to Jejudo island. The 124th division was initially severely understrength in men and equipment, with divisional artillery company instead of artillery regiment, and only the half complement of the infantry support guns, plus severe shortage of machine guns and ammunition. By July 1945, 116th artillery regiment comprising 24 guns, including Type 41 75 mm Mountain Guns, Type 90 75 mm Field Guns, and heavy Type 96 15 cm howitzers was organized. Also, over 4000 Koreans and local Chinese people were drafted and incorporated into the division ranks, bringing 124th division to nearly nominal strength. Nonetheless, the Kwantung Army headquarters has estimated the combat efficiency of the 124th division to be 35% of nominal.

By June 1945, the 124th division was mostly concentrated at Muling.

9 August 1945, the Soviet invasion of Manchuria has started. Rapid breakthrough by the Soviet Soviet 1st Far East Front have brought the 124th division to the spearhead of enemy advance, with the border defenses failing at Suifenhe. In the afternoon of the same day, the 124th division was reinforced by two infantry battalions from the 135th division.

10 August 1945, to prevent dissection and encirclement by the Soviet armoured columns, the 124th division was ordered to retreat. The division was reinforced by the following units: 20th heavy artillery regiment (7 batteries), Mudanjiang heavy artillery regiment (8 x Type 45 240 mm howitzers transferred from 34th army), Dongning heavy artillery regiment (2 batteries transferred from the 3rd army), 1st independent heavy artillery battery (150mm howitzers) and 13th mortar battalion, totalling 60 guns. Also, two engineer battalions and 31st independent anti-tank battalion (2 companies) were added. This meager force was pitted against whole of Soviet 5th army (2nd formation) and other formations, totalling 12 rifle divisions and 5 armoured brigades.

The fierce fighting has erupted 12 August 1945, and 273rd infantry regiment was nearly annihilated in the span of one day, while Red Army broke at Muling, approaching Modaoshi44.567°N 129.867°E. The attack was finally stopped by the special officers units from the 5th army reserve, but 124th division has continued to crumple under the relentless attack.

13 August 1945, the 20th heavy artillery regiment and Mudanjiang heavy artillery regiment were wiped out north of Modaoshi, and in evening the Red Army has resumed an advance from Modaoshi.

The surrender of Japan 15 August 1945 prevented an imminent rout of the 124th division. At that point, the division was concentrated around Dongjingcheng, Ning'an.

The 124th division has officially surrendered to the Red Army 23 August 1945 in Ning'an and was taken prisoner by the Soviet Union. Total of around 4000 men have died both during fighting and in the Siberian labour camps.

== See also ==
- List of Japanese Infantry Divisions

== Notes and references ==
- This article incorporates material from Japanese Wikipedia page 第124師団 (日本軍), accessed 30 June 2016
- Madej, W. Victor, Japanese Armed Forces Order of Battle, 1937–1945 [2 vols], Allentown, PA: 1981.
