= 148th Division (Imperial Japanese Army) =

- 第148師団
- Active: 1945–1945
- Country: Empire of Japan
- Allegiance: 30th army
- Branch: Imperial Japanese Army
- Type: Infantry
- Size: 2000
- Garrison/HQ: Changchun
- Nickname: Fugaku division
- Engagements: none

The 148th Division (第148師団, Dai-hyakuyonjūhachi Shidan) was an infantry division of the Imperial Japanese Army. Its call sign was the Fugaku Division (富嶽兵団, Fugaku Heidan). It was formed 10 July 1945 in Changchun as a triangular division. It was a part of the 8 simultaneously created divisions batch comprising 134th, 135th, 136th, 137th, 138th, 139th, 148th and 149th divisions. The nucleus for the formation was the garrison of Changchun.

== Action ==
During the Soviet invasion of Manchuria, the 148th division was ordered to construct fortifications and garrison Changchun, although the division was nearly unarmed and not equipped.

The 148th division was disarmed 20–22 August 1945 without seeing any action during Soviet invasion of Manchuria.

== See also ==
- List of Japanese Infantry Divisions

== Notes and references ==
- This article incorporates material from Japanese Wikipedia page 第148師団 (日本軍), accessed 11 July 2016
- Madej, W. Victor, Japanese Armed Forces Order of Battle, 1937–1945 [2 vols], Allentown, PA: 1981.
