= 386th Rifle Division =

386th Rifle Division (August 19, 1941 – June 30, 1942) 386th Rifle Division (November 22, 1944 – 1946)
- Active: 1941 - 1946
- Country: Soviet Union
- Branch: Red Army
- Type: Division
- Role: Infantry
- Engagements: Siege of Sevastopol (1941–1942); Soviet invasion of Manchuria
- Decorations: Order of the Red Banner (2nd Formation)

Commanders
- Notable commanders: Col. Nikolai Filippovich Skutelnik; Col. Kondratii Mikhailovich Pshenichnikov; Col. Sergei Andreevich Tugolukov

The 386th Rifle Division was raised in 1941 as an infantry division of the Red Army, and served twice during the Great Patriotic War in that role. The division followed a very similar combat path to that of the 388th Rifle Division in both of its formations. It was first formed on August 19 in the Transcaucasus Military District. In late December it was shipped from the Black Sea ports to Sevastopol, which was under siege by the German 11th Army. The division arrived just as the second Axis assault on the fortress was ending and did not see any heavy fighting until the final offensive, Operation Störfang, began on June 2, 1942. On June 18 it came under attack from the Romanian Mountain Corps and put up a stiff fight but rapidly lost strength and cohesion before falling back towards the port in the last days of the month; it was officially disbanded just days before the final Axis victory. In the buildup to the Soviet invasion of Manchuria a new 386th was formed in the Far Eastern Front in late 1944. The new division fought with enough distinction that it was awarded the Order of the Red Banner, and continued to serve briefly into the postwar period.

== 1st Formation ==
The 386th began forming on August 19, 1941 at Tiflis in the Transcaucasus Military District, Its order of battle, based on the first wartime shtat (table of organization and equipment) for rifle divisions, was as follows:

- 769th Rifle Regiment
- 772nd Rifle Regiment
- 775th Rifle Regiment
- 952nd Artillery Regiment
- 90th Antitank Battalion
- 180th Antiaircraft Battery (later 677th Antiaircraft Battalion)
- 674th Mortar Battalion
- 451st Reconnaissance Company
- 670th Sapper Battalion
- 840th Signal Battalion
- 474th Medical/Sanitation Battalion
- 467th Chemical Protection (Anti-gas) Company
- 504th Motor Transport Company
- 239th Field Bakery
- 814th Divisional Veterinary Hospital
- 1447th Field Postal Station
- 718th Field Office of the State Bank

Col. Nikolai Filippovich Skutelnik was assigned to command of the division on the day it formed, and he would remain in command throughout the existence of this formation. It continued forming under the military district headquarters into September and late that month was transferred to Transcaucasus Front. As of December 1 it was under command of the 46th Army. Beginning on December 26 it was shipped from several of the Transcaucasus Black Sea ports into Sevastopol to join the Soviet forces besieged there.

=== Siege of Sevastopol ===
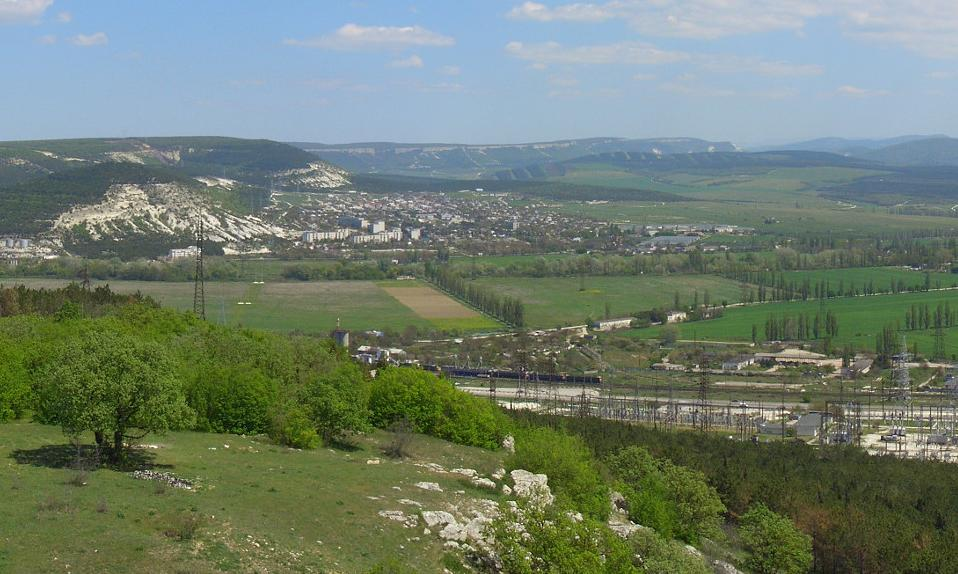
Modern view of the village Sugar Head and the defense sector of the 386th Infantry Division

The 386th arrived during the German second assault on the city, which began on December 17. On December 21 the commander of Coastal Army, Maj. Gen. Ivan Petrov, was informed that the division would be sent to Sevastopol, in addition to the 345th Rifle Division and 81st Tank Battalion. At 0540 hours on the morning of December 29 the cruiser Molotov arrived in the port, carrying 1,200 men of the 769th Rifle Regiment. Two days later Petrov's headquarters sent out a request for the remainder of the division to be sent out post-haste. At 1050 hours, as the German second assault was ending, the 772nd Rifle Regiment arrived and began moving to Dergacheva on the Suzdal Heights; word was also received that further troops were on the way from Poti. Major German offensive actions would not resume until June, 1942. During the first days of January the remainder of the 386th arrived, minus its artillery, and it was placed opposite the Romanian 1st Mountain Brigade. The 952nd Artillery Regiment finally arrived aboard the transport Krasnyi Kuban on January 28. The guns of the 677th Antiaircraft Battalion were lost at sea in the spring.

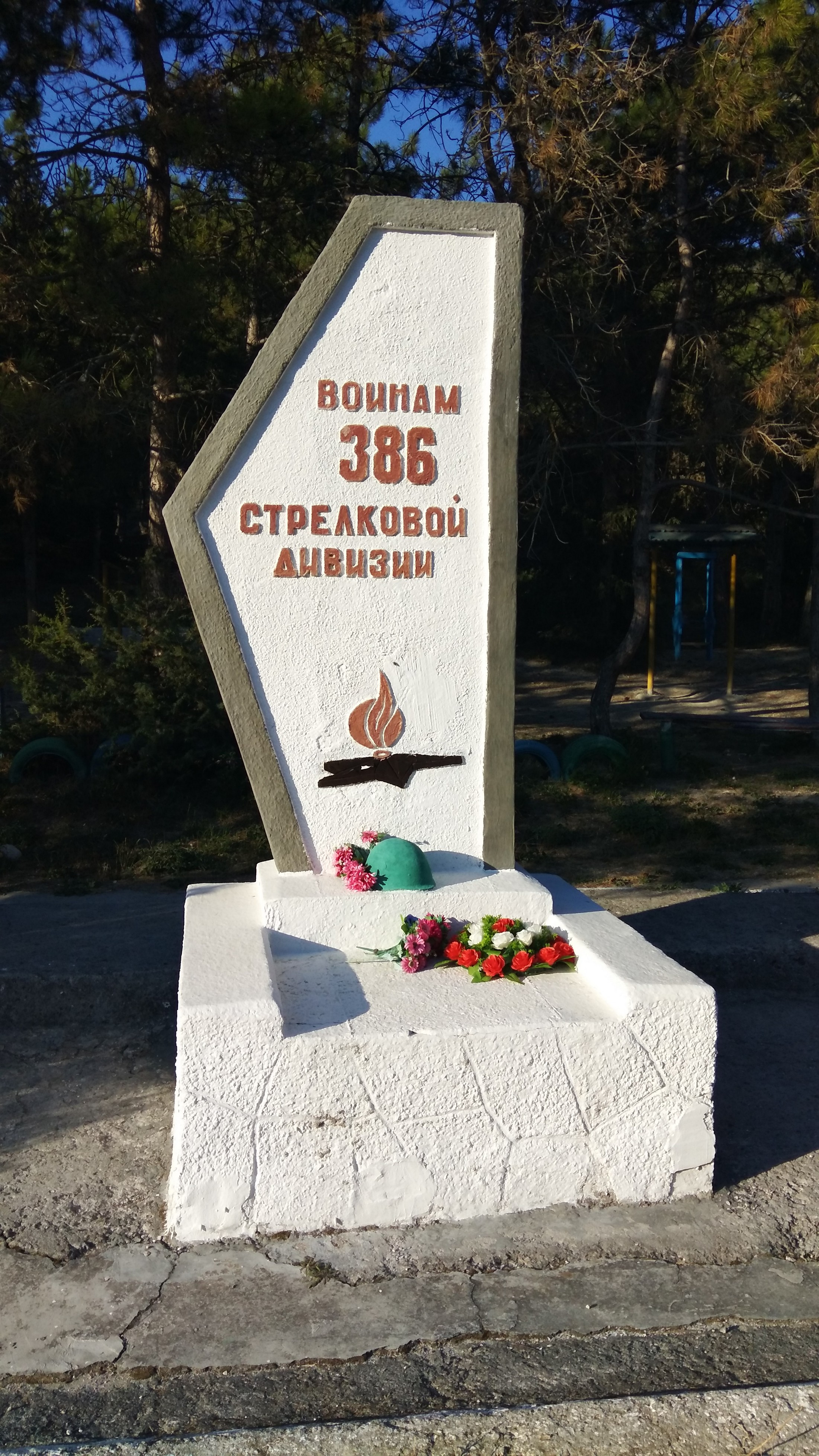
Monument to the soldiers of the 386th Infantry Division in the village of Sugar Head

During the spring Colonel Skutelnik was put in command of Defense Sector II, which was manned by his own division in the Chernaya River valley plus the 8th and 7th Naval Infantry Brigades. The latter unit held the same ground where Russian artillery had repulsed the Charge of the Light Brigade in 1854. The sector was 17.5 km long and ran from that point generally northward along the tops of the heights and reverse slopes of Mount Gasfort, Telegraph Hill and the heights above the Chorguns to Shuli. The lines of the 386th consisted mostly of trenches and a few pre-cast bunkers. The division also held two strongpoints equipped with bunkers and field fortifications at or near the tops of Mount Kara-Koba and Sugar Head.

The third German assault began with an intensive bombardment from June 2 to 6. The ground attack started at 0700 hours on June 7, but initially targeted Defense Sectors III and IV to the north. Later the 1st Romanian Guards Division attacked the left flank of 7th Naval Infantry and the 772nd Regiment in the vicinity of the village of Upper Chorgun with little success.

On June 11, 1942, in a battle, junior political instructor M. L. Gakhokidze, with three soldiers, rushed to the aid of a flanking rifle platoon, whose situation was becoming critical. As a result, the four were cut off from their unit, but were able to capture an enemy machine gun and use it against the enemy. The fighters managed to destroy about seventy fascists, of which 30 were on account of Mikhail Gakhokidze himself. By decree of the Presidium of the USSR Armed Forces of June 20, 1942, he was awarded the title of Hero of the Soviet Union for "exemplary performance of combat missions of the command on the front against the German invaders and the courage and heroism shown in the process."

On June 18 the Romanian Mountain Corps finally made a major attack against Sector II's defenses. The 1st Mountain Division struggled for three days to gain control of North Nose and Sugar Head; the battle swung back and forth as the 7th Naval Infantry and the 386th counterattacked regularly to regain any lost ground but by June 20 the Romanians gained their objectives at the cost of thousands of casualties. The next night two battalions of the German 420th Infantry Regiment joined the Romanians in a sudden night attack which overwhelmed and routed the one regiment of the division on the Fedyukhiny Heights. Over the following days the Romanian Corps cleared several Soviet positions in the Chernaya valley and forced the rest of the Sector II forces to retreat. As they retreated, sappers of the 386th blew up Bunker 40 at the foot of Sugar Head.

At dawn on June 28 the remnants of the division were positioned 400 m south of Hill 75.0 facing the Romanian 1st and 4th Mountain Divisions. Before dawn on the 29th the German XXX Corps launched an all-out offensive to finally gain Sapun Ridge. Part of the attacking force struck the 7th Naval Infantry at its junction with the 769th Regiment while Romanian 4th Mountain joined in from the direction of Novo Shuli. Later that morning the 8th Naval Infantry reported that the 775th Regiment was retreating in disarray from Sapun under heavy enemy fire towards the English Victoria redoubt, where what remained of the division joined them. By late afternoon the 386th was trapped as German forces advanced towards the south shore of Sevastopol Bay along Killen Ravine. The remnants of 772nd and 769th Regiments were ordered to attack the German flank. The remainder of the division waited for orders to break out and retreat, but none came. The command staff decided to blow up the command post bunker and all the divisional documents. On June 30 the division was officially disbanded.

== 2nd Formation ==
After an absence of more than two years from the Red Army order of battle, much like the 384th Rifle Division, a new 386th was formed on November 22, 1944 in the 39th Rifle Corps of the 25th Army of the Far Eastern Front. It had an entirely different order of battle from the 1st formation:

- 411th Rifle Regiment
- 495th Rifle Regiment
- 537th Rifle Regiment
- 1014th Artillery Regiment
- 469th Self-Propelled Gun Battalion
- 402nd Antitank Battalion
- 164th Reconnaissance Company
- 199th Sapper Battalion
- 1026th Signal Company
- 376th Medical/Sanitation Battalion
- 253rd Chemical Protection (Anti-gas) Company
- 615th Motor Transport Company
- 599th Field Bakery
- 472nd Divisional Veterinary Hospital
- 3150th Field Postal Station
- 2003rd Field Office of the State Bank

Col. Kondratii Mikhailovich Pshenichnikov was appointed to command on the day the division re-formed, and remained in command until February 27, 1945, when he was replaced by Col. Sergei Andreevich Tugolukov, who would remain in this post for the duration.

=== Invasion of Manchuria ===
When the Manchurian operation began on August 9 the division was still in 39th Corps of 25th Army, which was now part of the 1st Far Eastern Front. 39th Corps moved into its final attack positions as late as possible on the evening of August 8. The Corps had the 386th and 40th Rifle Divisions in the first echelon with the 384th in second. Assault groups were formed from the border guards and fortified region troops who were familiar with the terrain, with one advance battalion from each lead rifle regiment to follow, and the 259th Tank Brigade that would take the lead once a penetration was made. In addition, to maintain surprise there would be no artillery preparation. Light rain began about midnight which would soon intensify; while this hindered movement it also contributed to surprise. By the end of the day the 39th Corps had advanced 10 to 12 km into the Japanese rear on the Pad Sennaya axis and were beginning to fight for the town of Tungning and the vital rail line to Tumen.

On August 11 the 386th was re-subordinated to the 88th Rifle Corps, still in 25th Army. On the previous two days advance units of the 108th and 113th Fortified Regions had captured Japanese positions across the Hunchun and Tumen rivers, north of the old 1938 battlefield at Lake Khasan. 88th Corps was committed to support the fortified regions and advanced on the Hunchun - Tumen axis. By August 14 Hunchun was taken by 113th Fortified Region, but as it advanced toward the Inanho River it faced heavy opposition from the Japanese 112th Infantry Division. The next day the 386th, supported by the 209th Tank Brigade, drove across the Inanho but ran into one regiment of the Japanese division, strongly entrenched, and several attempts to dislodge them failed. Late in the day the 258th Rifle Division from Corps second echelon crossed the Tumen at Hunyong to attack the Japanese right flank. On August 16 elements of the 113th Fortified Region extended their operations eastward on the division's right flank but ran into the remainder of the Japanese 112th, which held its positions, but by now was encircled on three sides by 25th Army. On the 17th the ring closed around the 112th and its neighboring 79th Infantry Division as 39th Corps secured Tumen while 88th Corps pushed aside a regiment of the 79th Infantry at Mayusan and occupied Onsang, 10km east of Tumen. Remaining Japanese units surrendered or fled into the hills south of the Tumen River.

With the official Japanese surrender pending, on August 18 the 88th Corps, supported by the 10th Mechanized Corps, continued to clear northeastern Korea south of Yenchi and Tumen. Through the rest of the month these two forces advanced south into the Korean peninsula, finally reaching the 38th parallel, the line agreed upon by the Soviet and American authorities for separation their occupation forces. On September 19 the 386th was recognized for its service in the campaign with the award of the Order of the Red Banner. The division was disbanded as part of the 88th Corps of the 25th Army in 1946.
