= Sanchakou, Heilongjiang =

Sanchakou 三岔口镇
- Town
- Location in Heilongjiang Sanchakou (China)
- Coordinates: 44°01′01″N 131°14′16″E
- Country: People's Republic of China
- Province: Heilongjiang
- Prefecture-level city: Mudanjiang
- County-level city: Dongning
- Time zone: UTC+8 (China Standard)

Sanchakou (Chinese: 三岔口; pinyin: Sānchàkǒu) is a town on the Chinese-Russian border in Dongning, Heilongjiang province, China. As of 2018, it had 13 villages under its administration. It was formerly known as Sanchakou Korean Ethnic Town.

== See also ==
- List of township-level divisions of Heilongjiang
