= 149th Division (Imperial Japanese Army) =

- 第149師団
- Active: 1945–1945
- Country: Empire of Japan
- Allegiance: 4th army
- Branch: Imperial Japanese Army
- Type: Infantry
- Size: 12000
- Garrison/HQ: Qiqihar
- Nickname: Unbending division
- Engagements: none
- Commander: Sasaki Tōichi

The 149th Division (第149師団, Dai-hyakuyonjūkyū Shidan) was an infantry division of the Imperial Japanese Army. Its call sign was the Unbending Division (不撓兵団, Fugyo Heidan). It was formed 10 July 1945 in Qiqihar as a triangular division. It was a part of the 8 simultaneously created divisions batch comprising 134th, 135th, 136th, 137th, 138th, 139th, 148th and 149th divisions. The nucleus for the formation was the 274th infantry regiment taken from the 125th division.

== Action ==
Initially, the 149th division was mostly garrisoning Qiqihar. One battalion of the 386th infantry regiment was in Yi'an County, two other battalions of the 386th infantry regiment - in Bei'an. Also, one platoon of the 274th infantry regiment was deployed in Nehe.

During the Soviet invasion of Manchuria, the 149th division was ordered to Harbin 11 August 1945, arriving in parts 12–15 August 1945. The fortifications of Qiqihar were then taken over by the 136th Independent Mixed Brigade.

Although the division was relatively well equipped by rifles, the heavy weapons were deficient. In particular, it had absolutely no artillery. Kwantung Army has estimated combat efficiency of the 149th division to be 15% of the nominal.

The 149th division was disarmed 23 August 1945 without seeing any action during Soviet invasion of Manchuria. Majority of soldiers have then deserted or were hastily discharged before remainder of 4480 were taken prisoner in Hailin 27 August 1945 and sent to Siberian labour camps. Some officers have returned to Japan in 1947.

== See also ==
- List of Japanese Infantry Divisions

== Notes and references ==
- This article incorporates material from Japanese Wikipedia page 第149師団 (日本軍), accessed 11 July 2016
- Madej, W. Victor, Japanese Armed Forces Order of Battle, 1937–1945 [2 vols], Allentown, PA: 1981.
