= 139th Division (Imperial Japanese Army) =

- 第139師団
- Active: 1945–1945
- Country: Empire of Japan
- Allegiance: 1st area army
- Branch: Imperial Japanese Army
- Type: Infantry
- Garrison/HQ: Jilin
- Nickname: Formidable division
- Engagements: none

The 139th Division (第139師団, Dai-hyakusanjūkyū Shidan) was an infantry division of the Imperial Japanese Army. Its call sign was the Formidable Division (不屈兵団, Fukutsu Heidan). It was formed on 10 July 1945 in Dunhua as a triangular division. It was one of eight simultaneously created divisions, together with the 134th, 135th, 136th, 137th, 138th, 139th, 148th and 149th divisions. The nucleus for its formation were the 77th, 79th, and 80th transport guard units.

== Action ==
At the end of July 1945, the men detached from 79th division were used to form the assault (raiding, airborne) battalion. The 139th Division was disarmed on 22 August 1945 without having seen any action during the Soviet invasion of Manchuria.

== See also ==
- List of Japanese Infantry Divisions

== Notes and references ==
- This article incorporates material from Japanese Wikipedia page 第139師団 (日本軍), accessed 11 July 2016
- Madej, W. Victor, Japanese Armed Forces Order of Battle, 1937–1945 [2 vols], Allentown, PA: 1981.
