= Vilyam Rokhi =

Officer of the Latvian Red Army (1892–1938)

- Born: September 1892; Paltmale manor, Governorate of Livonia, Russian Empire
- Died: 9 April 1938 (aged 45) Khabarovsk, Soviet Union
- Allegiance: Russian Empire; Russian SFSR; Soviet Union
- Branch: Imperial Russian Army; Red Army
- Service years: 1914–1916; 1919–1937
- Rank: Komdiv
- Commands: 34th Rifle Division
- Conflicts: World War I; Russian Civil War
- Awards: Order of Lenin; Order of the Red Banner

Vilyam Yuryevich Rokhi (Russian: Вильям Юрьевич Рохи; September 1892 – 9 April 1938) was a Latvian Red Army Komdiv.

A typesetter by trade, Rokhi served two years in the Imperial Russian Army during World War I and was demobilized after being found unfit for service. He resumed work as a typesetter and held positions in printers' unions before being mobilized for Red Army service in 1919 during the Russian Civil War, serving as a political commissar. Decorated with the Order of the Red Banner for his leadership during the Red Army invasion of Georgia, Rokhi continued to serve as a division and corps commissar after the end of the war. In the late 1920s he held command of military schools and in 1932 became commander of the 34th Rifle Division, his last command before being arrested and executed during the Great Purge.

== Early life, World War I, and Russian Civil War ==
Rokhi was born during September 1892 in the Paltmale manor in the Governorate of Livonia in the family of a gardener. He graduated from primary school in 1906 and a Riga trade school in 1912, and began working in a printing house at the age of sixteen while a student in Riga. Rokhi became a typesetter after graduating from the trade school and continued working at a printing house in Riga. Drafted into the Imperial Russian Army in July 1914 when World War I began, he served as a private, first at the Grodno Fortress between 1914 and 1915 and then with the 176th Reserve Regiment in 1916. Rokhi was shell-shocked during the fighting and was demobilized in 1916 as a private after being found unfit for further service.

Later that year, he worked as a typesetter in Vitebsk, being elected secretary of the board of the health fund and a board member of the city printer's union. In 1917, he continued as a typesetter, now in the printing house of Pravda in Petrograd. Following the February Revolution, Rokhi joined the Bolshevik Party in July of that year. Between 1918 and 1919 Rokhi was a board member of the Petrograd Printers' Union, chairman of the printing department of the Petrograd Economic Council, and member and secretary of the central committee of the All-Russian Printing Industry Union. In February 1919 he helped organize the Vilna Military Revolutionary Committee. He then served as an agitator in the Riga Red Guard regiment, later becoming its political commissar.

Mobilized for Red Army service in October of the latter year during the Russian Civil War, Rokhi became chief of the political department of the 1st Moscow Cavalry Division, serving as division political commissar between July and December 1920. During 1921 and 1922 he was commissar of the 12th and 18th Cavalry Divisions and then the Separate Caucasian Cavalry Brigade. Rokhi was awarded the Order of the Red Banner on 8 December 1922 for his personal leadership of the vanguard of the 12th and 18th Divisions on 16 February near Krasny Most and on 28 February near Khetistavi, "contributing to success in these sectors of the front," during the Red Army invasion of Georgia in February 1921.

== Interwar period ==
After the end of the Russian Civil War, Rokhi became chief of the political department of the 13th Rifle Corps in November 1922. During the suppression of the Basmachi movement, he served as commissar of the 2nd Separate Turkestan Cavalry Brigade from April 1923, and between April and June 1924 as a commissar of the 2nd Turkestan Rifle Division, member of the Revolutionary Military Council of the Fergana Group of Forces of the Turkestan Front, and as commissar of the 11th Gomel Cavalry Division. Rokhi transferred to serve in the same position with the 7th Samara Cavalry Division in June 1924 and in November of that year became commissar of the 5th Rifle Corps.

He became chief of the distribution section of the organizational and distribution department of the Red Army Political Directorate in February 1925, before graduating from Commanders' Improvement Courses (KUVNAS) at the Frunze Military Academy in the following year. Upon graduation, Rokhi was appointed chief of the Military-Political School of the Ukrainian Military District. He transferred to become assistant commander of the 1st Rifle Corps for political affairs in January 1928, and a year later became chief and commissar of the Leningrad Infantry School. He studied at the Frunze Academy between 1930 and 1932 as a member of the first class of the advanced Special Group of the academy.

Upon graduation, Rokhi became commander of the 34th Middle Volga Rifle Division, his final assignment. The division was transferred to the Special Red Banner Far Eastern Army in 1934. He received the rank of Komdiv in 1935 when the Red Army introduced personal ranks, and in 1936 was awarded the Order of Lenin. Just before the Great Purge reached the army, People's Commissar of Defense Kliment Voroshilov wrote a letter to Rokhi on 5 May 1937, admonishing him for lapses in discipline in the division, awaiting "detailed explanations on...how exactly you could allow such disgracefulness and what exactly you will do in the future to avoid a recurrence of such shameful phenomena." In his reply on 7 June, Rokhi stated that "I deserve this punishment...I will do my best to make amends with even more energetic work." Rokhi was arrested on 2 July as a participant in a nonexistent Latvian fascist organization, less than a month later, and was sentenced to death by the Military Collegium of the Supreme Court of the Soviet Union on 9 April 1938, charged with participation in a military conspiracy. Rokhi was shot in Khabarovsk on the same day, being buried there. He was posthumously pardoned on 31 October 1956 as part of de-Stalinization.
