= 136th Division (Imperial Japanese Army) =

- 第136師団
- Active: 1945–1945
- Country: Empire of Japan
- Allegiance: 3rd area army
- Branch: Imperial Japanese Army
- Type: Infantry
- Size: 9000
- Garrison/HQ: Shenyang
- Nickname: Invincible division
- Engagements: none

The 136th Division (第136師団, Dai-hyakusanjūroku Shidan) was an infantry division of the Imperial Japanese Army. Its call sign was the Invincible Division (不抜兵団, Fubatsu Heidan). It was formed 10 July 1945 in Benxi as a triangular division. It was a part of the 8 simultaneously created divisions batch comprising 134th, 135th, 136th, 137th, 138th, 139th, 148th and 149th divisions. The nucleus for the formation were the 2nd (Suifenhe) (or 3rd), 4th (Hulin) border guards groups, 46th transport guards group and 77th Independent Mixed Brigade.

== Action ==
The 136th division formation was complete 31 July 1945, although the divisional numerical strength was only 60% of the required rifles, machine guns and cannons. To substitute for a lack of rifles, hand spears were issued. Also, divisional medical, chemical and biological warfare units were authorized but not formed. Finally, 136th division had a shortage of anti-tank explosive charges.

At the start of the Soviet invasion of Manchuria 9 August 1945 the division was improving fortifications at Benxi. Immediately orders to move were received, and majority of troops gathered in Shenyang. Also, Airborne (assault) battalion was sent to Wensheng District while two battalions of the 372nd infantry regiment were sent to Liaoyang.

Also, with the start of the invasion, the Aritomi Airborne (assault) battalion in Xinmin, Liaoning was assigned to 136th division. Also, 10 August 1945, the Mizunima detachment formerly belonging to 108th division was received and also ordered to Shenyang. 13 August 1945, the divisional fortifications plans were approved and 371st infantry regiment was sent back to Benxi to implement it.

The division was partially disarmed 19 August 1945, leaving about 15% of weapons for security duties. 20 August 1945, the division commander (Atsushi Nakayama) together with many other Japanese generals was kidnapped by the Red Army in Shenyang, resulting in his forced disappearance. The entire division was taken prisoner by Soviet Union forces 10 September 1945, and sent to labour camps.

Majority of the men of the 136th division were taken prisoner to the Soviet Union in September 1945 - February 1946 period and then were housed in several labour camps, in Siberia and Moscow.

== See also ==
- List of Japanese Infantry Divisions

== Notes and references ==
- This article incorporates material from Japanese Wikipedia page 第136師団 (日本軍), accessed 8 July 2016
- Madej, W. Victor, Japanese Armed Forces Order of Battle, 1937–1945 [2 vols], Allentown, PA: 1981.
