= 122nd Division (Imperial Japanese Army) =

- 第122師団
- Active: 1945–1945
- Country: Empire of Japan
- Allegiance: 1st area army
- Branch: Imperial Japanese Army
- Type: Infantry
- Garrison/HQ: Mudanjiang
- Nickname: Maizuru division
- Engagements: Soviet invasion of Manchuria

The 122nd Division (第122師団, Dai-hyakunijūni Shidan) was an infantry division of the Imperial Japanese Army. Its call sign was the Maizuru Division (舞鶴兵団, Maizuru Heidan). It was formed 16 January in Mudanjiang as a triangular division. It was a part of a batch of eight simultaneously created divisions comprising the 121st, 122nd, 123rd, 124th, 125th, 126th, 127th and 128th Divisions. The nucleus for the formation was the 4th Independent Border Group and the remnants of the 11th Division.

== History ==
On 30 March 1945 the 122nd Division formation was complete and it was assigned to the 1st Area Army. It was tasked with garrisoning Mudanjiang. In June–July 1945, part of the division was moved to the Ning'an area.

At the start of the Soviet invasion of Manchuria the headquarters of the 122nd division were on the west coast of the Jingpo Lake. The 122nd Division surrendered to the Red Army on 17 August 1945.

== See also ==
- List of Japanese Infantry Divisions

== Notes and references ==
- This article incorporates material from Japanese Wikipedia page 第122師団 (日本軍), accessed 28 June 2016
- Madej, W. Victor, Japanese Armed Forces Order of Battle, 1937–1945 [2 vols], Allentown, PA: 1981.
