= Ijichi Kōsuke =

Japanese general (1854–1917)

Baron Ijichi Kōsuke
- 伊地知 幸介
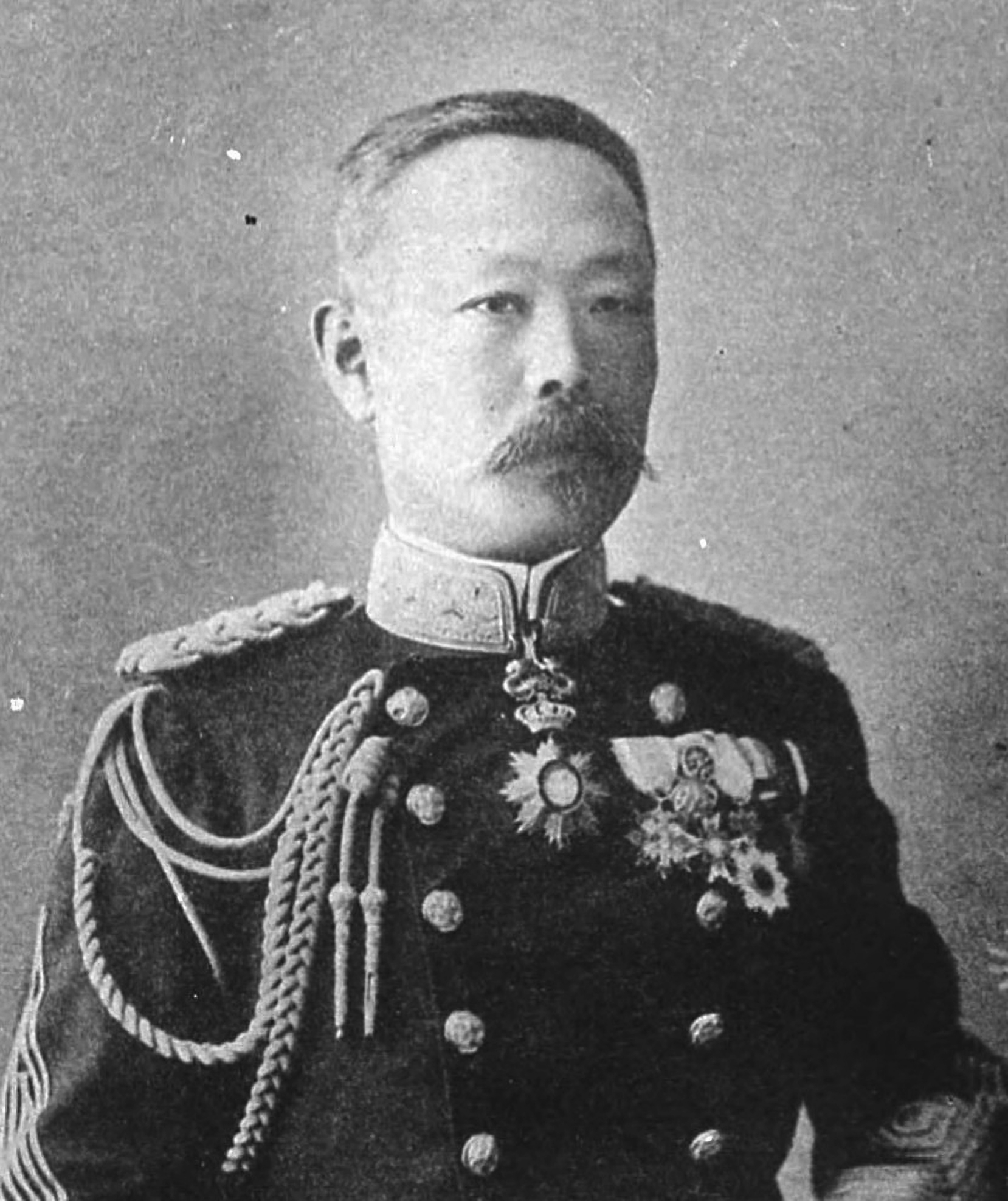
- Born: 25 December 1854; Kagoshima, Satsuma Domain, Japan
- Died: February 23, 1917 (aged 62); Kamakura, Japan
- Military career
- Allegiance: Empire of Japan
- Branch: Imperial Japanese Army
- Service years: 1880–1913
- Rank: Lieutenant General
- Conflicts: First Sino-Japanese War; Russo-Japanese War

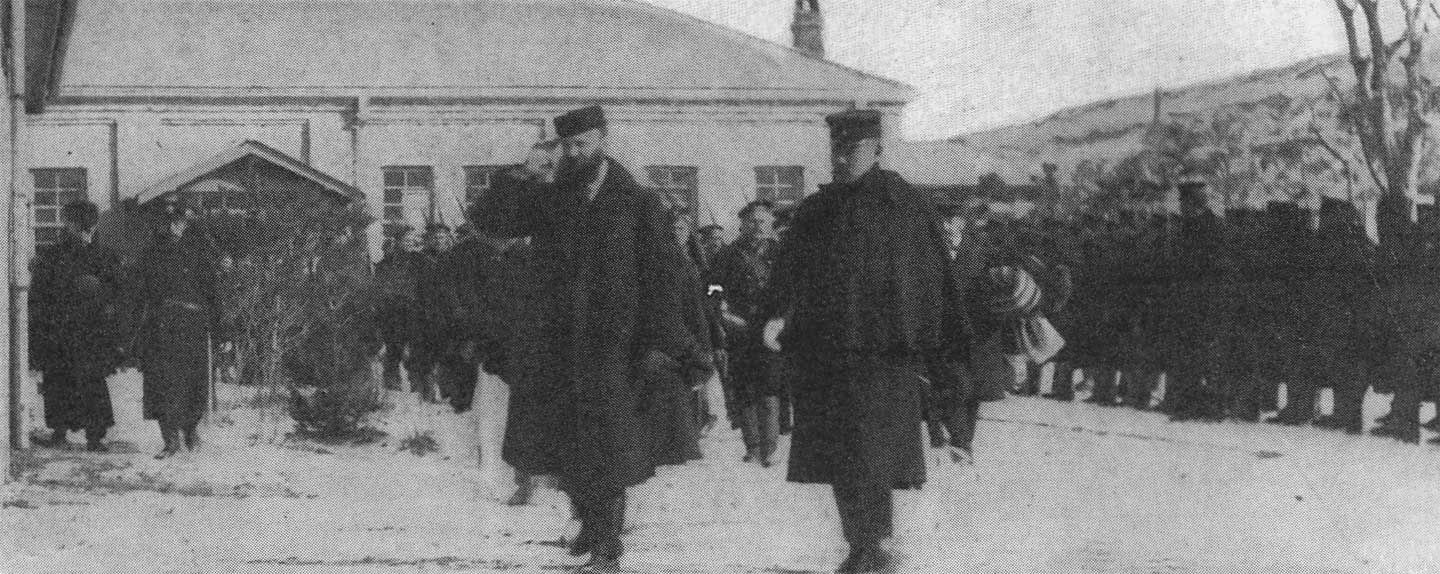
Russian Envoy Pavlov and Japanese General Ijichi in Seoul, 1904

Baron Ijichi Kōsuke (伊地知 幸介, Kōsuke Ijichi; December 25, 1854 – January 23, 1917) was a general in the Imperial Japanese Army in the First Sino-Japanese War and Chief of Staff of the Japanese Third Army during the Siege of Port Arthur in the Russo-Japanese War. His wife was the niece of Marshal Oyama Iwao.

== Biography ==
Ijichi was born to a samurai family in Kagoshima, Satsuma Domain (present-day Kagoshima prefecture). He was a graduate of the 2nd class of the Imperial Japanese Army Academy. After serving in the Imperial Guard, he was sent in 1880 to France for four years of training at the École spéciale militaire de Saint-Cyr, and from there to Germany. He was recalled before the start of the First Sino-Japanese War to serve on the planning department of the Imperial General Headquarters. After the war, he was sent as a military attaché to Great Britain from 1898 to 1900.

Promoted to major general in 1900, he held numerous staff positions within the Imperial Japanese Army General Staff pertaining to field artillery. He was also briefly assigned to the staff of the Japanese embassy in Seoul, Korea in 1903. With the start of the Russo-Japanese War, he was assigned as Chief of staff to General Nogi Maresuke’s Third Army, in charge of the operation against the Imperial Russian stronghold of Port Arthur during the Siege of Port Arthur. There were several reasons for his choice: Ijichi had wide experience with foreign tactics from his years overseas, spoke several languages fluently and could interface with foreign military observers. He was also a specialist in artillery. And furthermore, his Satsuma background provided for a balance to Nogi's Chōshū origins, which was thought necessary in an army still divided by regional loyalties. However, Ijichi clashed with Nogi on several occasions during the Port Arthur campaign over the extremely high rate of casualties the Japanese forces were taking, and the long months without appreciable progress against the heavily fortified Russian positions. The Japanese command blamed Ijichi, rather than Nogi, for incompetence, and for continuing to order ineffective human wave attacks against Russian positions. Marshall Yamagata Aritomo, on the General Staff of the Manchurian Army pushed strongly to have Ijichi replaced by General Kodama Gentarō. Due to these issues, Nogi replaced him as chief of staff after the fall of Port Arthur, and refused him a position in the 3rd Army at the Battle of Mukden, reassigning him back to the Japanese home islands to assume command of the coastal artillery at Tokyo Bay.

After the war, Ijichi was promoted to lieutenant general and given the rank of danshaku (baron) in the kazoku peerage in 1907. He attempted to resign, citing health reasons; however, he was persuaded to stay on as commander of the IJA 11th Division until 1908. He retired in 1913.
