= 134th Division (Imperial Japanese Army) =

- 第134師団
- Active: 1945–1945
- Country: Empire of Japan
- Allegiance: 1st area army
- Branch: Imperial Japanese Army
- Type: Infantry
- Size: 17891 or 14056
- Garrison/HQ: Fangzheng County
- Nickname: Jewel division
- Engagements: Soviet invasion of Manchuria

The 134th Division (第134師団, Dai-hyakusanjūyon Shidan) was an infantry division of the Imperial Japanese Army. Its call sign was the Jewel Division (勾玉兵団, Magatama Heidan). It was formed 10 July 1945 in Jiamusi as a triangular division. It was a part of the 8 simultaneously created divisions batch comprising 134th, 135th, 136th, 137th, 138th, 139th, 148th and 149th divisions. The nucleus for the formation were the 14th border guards group, Fujin garrison and 78th Independent Mixed Brigade.

== Action ==
The division formation was complete 30 July 1945. Initially the 134th division was assigned to the 5th army, but was reassigned to 1st area army at the start of the Soviet invasion of Manchuria 9 August 1945. The division combat efficiency was estimated by Kwantung Army to be 15%.

As the positions at Songhua River were deemed untenable, the 134th division have started retreat to Fangzheng County after a few delaying skirmishes. Since the divisional radio equipment breakdown 11 August 1945, the 134th division situation is unknown, with no contemporary records covering period prior to surrender of Japan 15 August 1945.

The 134th division was disarmed 25 August 1945, after suffering 471 men killed in the short campaign. Despite light losses, the division was severely disorganized, losing one-third of combat efficiency during retreat.

The majority of men of 134th division were taken to Soviet Union labour camps near Khabarovsk 26 September 1945.

== See also ==
- List of Japanese Infantry Divisions
- Independent Mixed Brigades (Imperial Japanese Army)

== Notes and references ==
- This article incorporates material from Japanese Wikipedia page 第134師団 (日本軍), accessed 7 July 2016
- Madej, W. Victor, Japanese Armed Forces Order of Battle, 1937–1945 [2 vols], Allentown, PA: 1981.
