= Sunwu, Heilongjiang =

Sunwu 孙吴镇
- Town
- Location in Heilongjiang Sunwu (China)
- Coordinates: 49°25′24″N 127°19′19″E
- Country: People's Republic of China
- Province: Heilongjiang
- Prefecture-level city: Heihe
- County: Sunwu
- Village-level divisions: 6 residential committees 9 villages
- Time zone: UTC+8 (China Standard)

Sunwu (simplified Chinese: 孙吴镇; traditional Chinese: 孫吳鎮; pinyin: Sūnwú Zhèn) is a town of Sunwu County, Heihe, Heilongjiang, People's Republic of China.

== Administrative divisions ==
As of 2017, it had six residential committees (社区居委会) and nine villages (居委会) under its administration. The town administers the following:

Residential committees:

- Jianhua (建华), Guangming (光明), Xinhua (新华), Shangmao (商茂), Yongxing (永兴), Tiebei (铁北)

Villages:

- Hebei (河北), Xinxing (新兴), Xinghua (兴华), Beisun (北孙), Santun (三屯), Yongyue (永跃), Xingchuan (兴川), Yongsheng (永胜), Zhennan (镇南)

== See also ==
- List of township-level divisions of Heilongjiang
