= 112th Division (Imperial Japanese Army) =

- 第112師団
- Active: 1944–1945
- Country: Empire of Japan
- Allegiance: 3rd army
- Branch: Imperial Japanese Army
- Type: Infantry
- Size: 16218
- Garrison/HQ: Hunchun
- Nickname: Public Division
- Engagements: Soviet invasion of Manchuria

The 112th Division (第112師団, Dai-hyakujūni Shidan) was an infantry division of the Imperial Japanese Army. Its call sign was the Public Division (公兵団, Kimi Heidan). It was formed 12 July 1944 in Hunchun as a triangular division. The nucleus for the formation was the remnants of the 28th Division been transferred to Miyako-jima. The division was initially assigned to the Third army.

== Action ==
The garrison of the division was the Jiandao area. As the Soviet invasion of Manchuria has started 9 August 1945, it fought a desperate defensive battle meeting Red Army forces south and west of Hunchun while fighting the against Soviet "113th fortified sector" and 88th Rifle Corps. The division's resistance was described as "heavy", despite the estimate by the 1st Area Army that the 112th was only 35% combat effective. 11 August 1945, a frontal attack by the Soviet armour near Michiang was repulsed. The Hunchun itself was lost to Soviet forces 14 August 1945, after Red Army was forced to send in reinforcements in the form of 386th Rifle Division. Another Soviet attack supported by armour was beaten back 15 August 1945 at Unggidong. Although the next Soviet attack was expected at Pungni-ju city, 16 August 1945 all of the division's units were engaged by Red Army forces simultaneously. The unit was ordered to surrender 18 August 1945 as the part of the general surrender of Japan.

The majority of the division was then taken prisoner by the Soviet Union.

== See also ==
- List of Japanese Infantry Divisions

== Notes and references ==
- This article incorporates material from Japanese Wikipedia page 第112師団 (日本軍), accessed 27 June 2016
- Madej, W. Victor, Japanese Armed Forces Order of Battle, 1937–1945 [2 vols], Allentown, PA: 1981.
