= 135th Division (Imperial Japanese Army) =

- 第135師団
- Active: 1945–1945
- Country: Empire of Japan
- Allegiance: 5th army
- Branch: Imperial Japanese Army
- Type: Infantry
- Size: 14288
- Garrison/HQ: Mishan
- Nickname: Cordiality division
- Engagements: Soviet invasion of Manchuria

The 135th Division (第135師団, Dai-hyakusanjūgo Shidan) was an infantry division of the Imperial Japanese Army. Its call sign was the Cordiality Division (真心兵団, Shinshin Heidan). It was formed 10 July 1945 in Mishan as a triangular division. It was a part of the 8 simultaneously created divisions batch comprising 134th, 135th, 136th, 137th, 138th, 139th, 148th and 149th divisions. The nucleus for the formation were the 2nd (Suifenhe) (or 3rd), 4th (Hulin) border guards groups, 46th transport guards group and 77th Independent Mixed Brigade.

== Action ==
The 135th division took the defensive sector previously occupied by the 11th division and later by 77th Independent Mixed Brigade.

With the start of the Soviet invasion of Manchuria 9 August 1945, the Red Army immediately pierced in the sector of 135th division, manned by 15th border guards group at Hutou.45.979°N 133.661°E The 15th border guards group was assigned to 135th division at the beginning of the battle. Nonetheless, because of the more threatening Soviet breakthrough at Suifenhe, two infantry battalions were detached from the 135th division 9 August 1945 and were reassigned to the 124th division. The 135th division, catch off-guard, with majority of officers attending a war game at Yangming District was ordered to withdraw to Yangming District in the evening 10 August 1945. 15 August 1945 it was ordered to retreat further to Mudanjiang, and finally order to surrender was received 17 August 1945 as the part of the surrender of Japan.

The lack of equipment was severe. Some of the required bayonets and swords of the division were forged locally from the available material like the steel salvaged from automotive suspensions. The artillery of the 135th division was the worst among 5th army, with only about two-thirds complement represented by Type 41 75 mm Cavalry Guns, trench mortars and other miscellaneous weapons. Before the Soviet invasion of Manchuria, the Kwantung Army command has estimated the 135th division being at 15% of the nominal combat strength. The 135th division has suffered 1631 men killed during the short campaign.

The majority of the troops of the 135th division were taken prisoner by Red Army and sent to the Siberian labour camps.

== See also ==
- List of Japanese Infantry Divisions
- Independent Mixed Brigades (Imperial Japanese Army)

== Notes and references ==
- This article incorporates material from Japanese Wikipedia page 第135師団 (日本軍), accessed 8 July 2016
- Madej, W. Victor, Japanese Armed Forces Order of Battle, 1937–1945 [2 vols], Allentown, PA: 1981.
