= 123rd Division (Imperial Japanese Army) =

- 第123師団
- Active: 1945–1945
- Country: Empire of Japan
- Allegiance: 4th army
- Branch: Imperial Japanese Army
- Type: Infantry
- Garrison/HQ: Sunwu County
- Nickname: Matsukaze division
- Engagements: Soviet invasion of Manchuria

The 123rd Division (第123師団, Dai-hyakunijūsan Shidan) was an infantry division of the Imperial Japanese Army. Its call sign was the Matsukaze Division (松風兵団, Matsukaze Heidan). It was formed on 16 January 1945 in Sunwu County, in what was the Manchukuo, as a triangular division. It was part a batch of eight simultaneously created divisions: the 121st, 122nd, 123rd, 124th, 125th, 126th, 127th and 128th Divisions. The nucleus of the formation was the 73rd Independent Mixed Brigade, which was formed in October 1944 from the headquarters of the 1st Division.

== History ==
On 30 March 1945 the 123rd Division's formation was complete and it was assigned to the 4th Army. It was tasked with the garrison of Sunwu County, adjacent to the 135th Independent Mixed Brigade in Aihui District. The division fought and withstood the Soviet invasion of Manchuria with heavy casualties, but did not yield until the surrender of Japan on 15 August 1945. The majority of division personnel were taken prisoner to the Soviet Union in September 1945.

== See also ==
- List of Japanese Infantry Divisions
- Independent Mixed Brigades (Imperial Japanese Army)

== Notes and references ==
- This article incorporates material from Japanese Wikipedia page 第123師団 (日本軍), accessed 28 June 2016
- Madej, W. Victor, Japanese Armed Forces Order of Battle, 1937–1945 [2 vols], Allentown, PA: 1981.
