= Sunwu County =

Sunwu County 孙吴县
- County
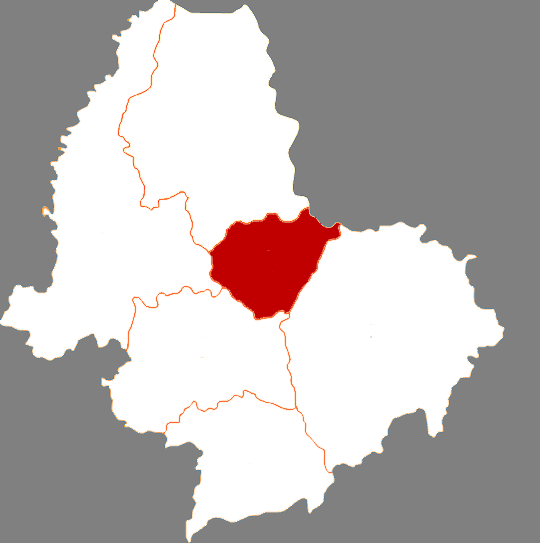
- Location of Sunwu County within Heihe

- Location in Heilongjiang
- Coordinates: 49°26′N 127°20′E
- Country: People's Republic of China
- Province: Heilongjiang
- Prefecture-level city: Heihe
- Township-level divisions: 1 subdistrict 2 towns 9 townships
- County seat: Sunwuchengqu Subdistrict (孙吴城区街道)

Area
  - Total: 4,448 km^{2} (1,717 sq mi)
- Elevation: 226 m (741 ft)

Population (2005)
  - Total: 104,717
  - Density: 23.54/km^{2} (60.97/sq mi)
- Time zone: UTC+8 (China Standard)
- Postal code: 164200
- Area code: 0456

Sunwu County (simplified Chinese: 孙吴县; traditional Chinese: 孫吳縣; pinyin: Sūnwú Xiàn) is a county under the administration of Heihe City in the north of Heilongjiang province, China, situated on the bank of Amur River, which demarcates the Sino-Russian border. The length of border line within Sunwu county is 36 km (22 mi).

Sunwu County is surrounded by Lesser Khingan Mountains, and its forest coverage is 45%. The urbanization level is 40%.

== Geography and climate ==
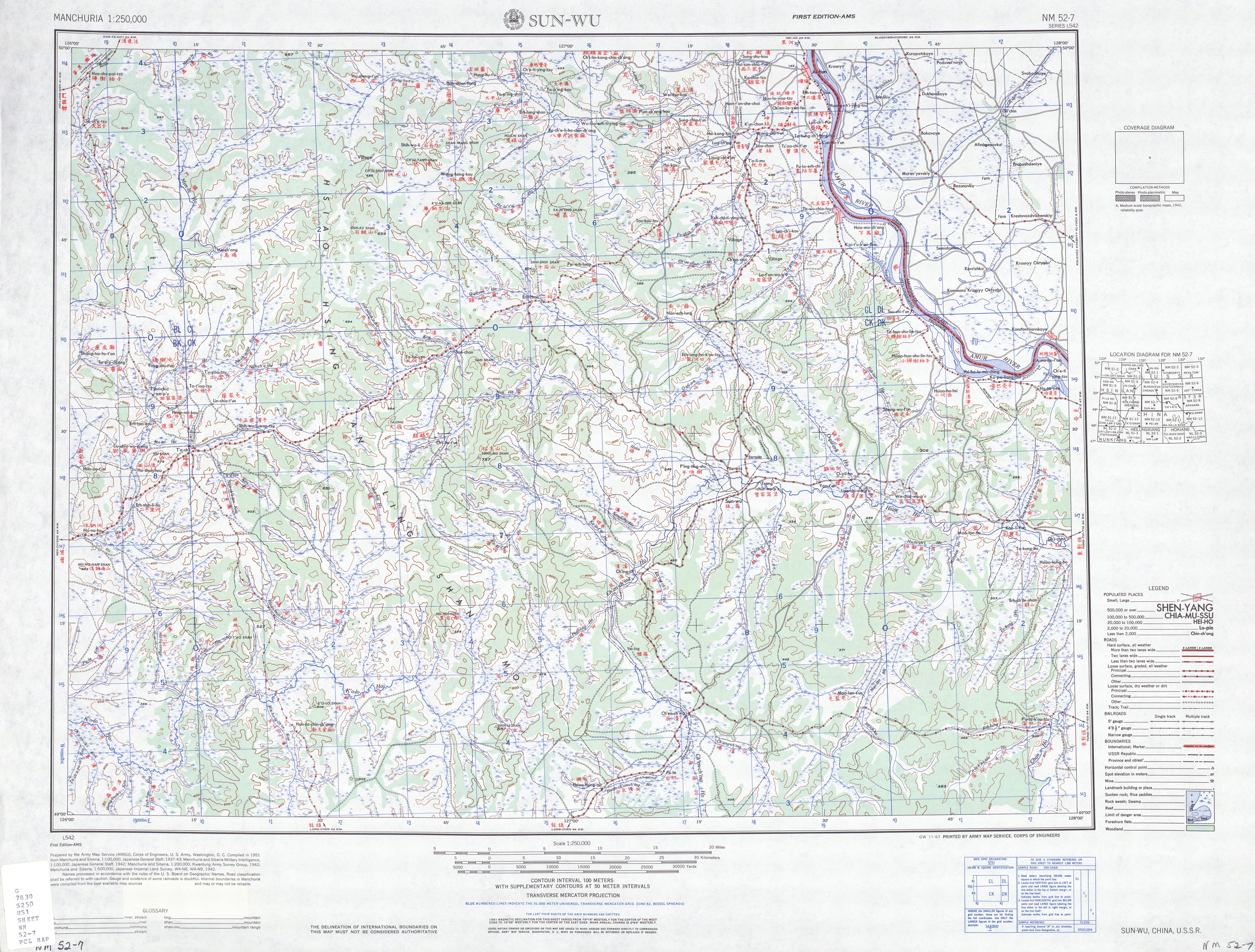
Sunwu (labelled as Sun-wu 孫吳) (1951)

Sunwu County has a monsoon-influenced humid continental climate (Köppen Dwb) with very warm, humid summers and severely cold, extremely dry winters. The monthly 24-hour average temperature ranges from −23.3 °C (−9.9 °F) in January to 20.4 °C (68.7 °F), while the annual mean is +0.18 °C (32.3 °F). More than three-fourths of the annual precipitation occurs from June to September. With monthly percent possible sunshine ranging from 52% in July to 73% in February, the area receives 2,576 hours of bright sunshine annually.

Climate data for Sunwu, elevation 235 m (771 ft), (1991–2020 normals, extremes 1971–2010)
Month	Jan	Feb	Mar	Apr	May	Jun	Jul	Aug	Sep	Oct	Nov	Dec	Year
Record high °C (°F)	1.6 (34.9)	6.0 (42.8)	19.0 (66.2)	26.9 (80.4)	34.6 (94.3)	38.7 (101.7)	36.2 (97.2)	34.1 (93.4)	32.3 (90.1)	26.2 (79.2)	11.5 (52.7)	1.6 (34.9)	38.7 (101.7)
Mean daily maximum °C (°F)	−14.7 (5.5)	−9.2 (15.4)	−0.5 (31.1)	10.6 (51.1)	19.3 (66.7)	24.8 (76.6)	27.0 (80.6)	24.7 (76.5)	19.0 (66.2)	9.1 (48.4)	−4.5 (23.9)	−14.3 (6.3)	7.6 (45.7)
Daily mean °C (°F)	−22.5 (−8.5)	−17.7 (0.1)	−7.6 (18.3)	4.1 (39.4)	12.3 (54.1)	18.3 (64.9)	21.2 (70.2)	18.8 (65.8)	12.0 (53.6)	2.6 (36.7)	−10.6 (12.9)	−20.9 (−5.6)	0.8 (33.5)
Mean daily minimum °C (°F)	−28.1 (−18.6)	−24.7 (−12.5)	−14.5 (5.9)	−2.5 (27.5)	4.7 (40.5)	11.4 (52.5)	15.6 (60.1)	13.4 (56.1)	5.6 (42.1)	−3.1 (26.4)	−15.8 (3.6)	−26 (−15)	−5.3 (22.4)
Record low °C (°F)	−48.1 (−54.6)	−44.8 (−48.6)	−39.9 (−39.8)	−22.2 (−8.0)	−11.5 (11.3)	−2.0 (28.4)	3.2 (37.8)	−1.6 (29.1)	−11.7 (10.9)	−27.9 (−18.2)	−36.2 (−33.2)	−43.3 (−45.9)	−48.1 (−54.6)
Average precipitation mm (inches)	5.5 (0.22)	5.6 (0.22)	9.7 (0.38)	21.5 (0.85)	48.5 (1.91)	94.8 (3.73)	139.4 (5.49)	120.4 (4.74)	65.3 (2.57)	27.5 (1.08)	11.4 (0.45)	8.4 (0.33)	558 (21.97)
Average precipitation days (≥ 0.1 mm)	7.4	4.8	5.8	7.2	11.3	13.5	15.1	14.4	10.7	7.4	7.6	7.7	112.9
Average snowy days	10.4	7.1	7.5	4.9	0.5	0	0	0	0.1	4.4	9.8	10.4	55.1
Average relative humidity (%)	72	68	61	54	56	70	79	81	72	63	69	73	68
Mean monthly sunshine hours	161.3	198.7	240.5	229.9	244.2	241.2	230.2	220.0	212.2	185.5	155.6	137.8	2,457.1
Percentage possible sunshine	60	69	65	55	51	50	48	50	57	56	58	55	56
Source 1: China Meteorological Administration
Source 2: Weather China

== Administrative divisions ==
There are two towns and nine townships in the county:

Towns:

- Sunwu (孙吴镇), Chenqing (辰清镇)

Townships:

- Xixing Township (西兴乡), Yanjiang Manchu Township (沿江满族乡), Yaotun Township (腰屯乡), Woniuhe Township (卧牛河乡), Qunshan Township (群山乡), Fendou Township (奋斗乡), Hongqi Township (红旗乡), Zhengyangshan Township (正阳山乡), Qingxi Township (清溪乡)

== Transport ==
- China National Highway 202
- Beihei Railway
