= 79th Division (Imperial Japanese Army) =

- 第79師団
- Active: 1945 - 1945
- Country: Empire of Japan
- Allegiance: 3rd army
- Branch: Imperial Japanese Army
- Type: Infantry
- Size: 15633
- Garrison/HQ: Ranam-guyok
- Nickname: Play Division
- Engagements: Soviet invasion of Manchuria

The 79th Division (第79師団, Dai-nanajūkyū Shidan) was an infantry division in the Imperial Japanese Army. Its call sign was the Play Division (奏兵団, So Heidan).It was created 6 February 1945 in Ranam-guyok and disbanded at Tumen, Jilin in September 1945. It was a triangular division. The men of the division were drafted through Ranam-guyok Korean mobilization district, although the divisional backbone was the men from 19th and 20th divisions.

== Action ==
The 79th division was assigned to the Kwantung Army 30 May 1945 and then to 3rd army and given a defensive sector at Tumen, Jilin in July 1945. At the end of July 1945, 1000 men were transferred to the newly formed 139th division.

The 79th division was estimated to be 55% combat affective by August 1945, making it the best unit available to the 3rd army. During the Soviet invasion of Manchuria, the 3rd battalion of the 291st infantry regiment have suffered a severe losses, but the hostilities ceased before the 79th division was seriously hit.

== References and further reading ==
- List of Japanese Infantry Divisions
- Madej, W. Victor. Japanese Armed Forces Order of Battle, 1937-1945 [2 vols] Allentown, PA: 1981

This article incorporates material from the article 第79師団 (日本軍) in the Japanese Wikipedia, retrieved on 20 June 2015.
