= Fifty-Eighth Army (Japan) =

Japanese Fifty-Eighth Army
- Active: April 7, 1945 – August 15, 1945
- Country: Empire of Japan
- Branch: Imperial Japanese Army
- Type: Infantry
- Role: Corps
- Engagements: Operation Downfall

The Japanese 58th Army (第58軍, Dai-gojyūhachi gun) was an army of the Imperial Japanese Army during the final days of World War II.

== History ==
The Japanese 58th Army was formed on April 7, 1945, under the Japanese 17th Area Army as part of the last desperate defense effort by the Empire of Japan to deter possible landings of Allied forces in Jejudo (Saishuto) island during Operation Downfall. The Japanese 58th Army consisted mostly of poorly trained reservists, conscripted students and home guard militia. It was demobilized at the surrender of Japan on August 15, 1945, without having seen combat.

== List of Commanders ==
=== Commanding officer ===
	Name	From	To
1	Lieutenant General Sadashige Nagatsu	7 April 1945	15 August 1945

=== Chief of Staff ===
	Name	From	To
1	Major General Yoshihide Kato	6 April 1945	19 August 1945
2	Major General Hisashi Kisaki	19 August 1945	1 September 1945
