= Thirtieth Army (Japan) =

Japanese Thirtieth Army
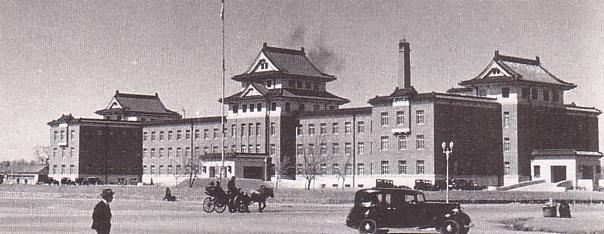
- Kwantung Army HQ in Xinjing, which also housed the IJA 30th Army HQ
- Active: July 30, 1945 - August 15, 1945
- Country: Empire of Japan
- Branch: Imperial Japanese Army
- Type: Infantry
- Role: Corps
- Garrison/HQ: Xinjing, Manchukuo
- Nickname(s): Hashi (敏, rapid)
- Engagements: Soviet invasion of Manchuria

The Japanese 30th Army (第30軍, Dai-sanjyū gun) was an army of the Imperial Japanese Army during the final days of World War II.

== History ==
The Japanese 30th Army was initially raised on July 30, 1945 in the Manchukuo capital of Xinjing. As the war situation on the Pacific front grew increasingly desperate for Japan, the Imperial Japanese Army transferred more and more experienced divisions out of Manchukuo to other fronts. By early 1945, the vaunted Kwantung Army was largely hollowed out, and indications of a buildup of Soviet Red Army forces on the borders on Mengjiang and Manchukuo were alarming. The Japanese 30th Army was assigned to the Japanese Third Area Army, and based in southern Manchukuo, but it was raised only days before the beginning of the Soviet invasion of Manchuria, and its force of under-armed and untrained raw recruits, reservists and civilian militia were absolutely no match for the experienced battle-hardened Soviet armored divisions. After a brief struggle at Xinjing (during which time the remnants of the Manchukuo Imperial Guard also defected to the Soviet side, the Japanese 30th Army surrendered. Most of its survivors became Japanese POWs in the Soviet Union, many of whom died under harsh conditions in Siberia and other parts of the Soviet Union.

== List of commanders ==
	Name	From	To
Commanding Officer	Lieutenant General Shōjirō Iida	30 July 1945	15 August 1945
Chief of Staff	Major General Michio Kato	29 July 1945	15 August 1945
