= Dongning, Heilongjiang =

Dongning 东宁市
- County-level city
- Location in Heilongjiang Dongning (China)
- Coordinates: 44°07′N 130°49′E
- Country: People's Republic of China
- Province: Heilongjiang
- Prefecture-level city: Mudanjiang

Area
  - Total: 7,368 km^{2} (2,845 sq mi)

Population (2003)
  - Total: 210,000
  - Density: 29/km^{2} (74/sq mi)
- Time zone: UTC+8 (China Standard)

Dongning (simplified Chinese: 东宁; traditional Chinese: 東寧; pinyin: Dōngníng; lit. 'Eastern tranquillity') is a county-level city of southeastern Heilongjiang province, China. It is under the jurisdiction of the prefecture-level city of Mudanjiang.

== Administrative divisions ==
Dongning City is divided into 6 towns.

6 towns

- Dongning (东宁镇), Sanchakou (三岔口镇), Daduchuan (大肚川镇), Laoheishan (老黑山镇), Daohe (道河镇), Suiyang (绥阳镇)

== Demographics ==
The population of the city was 205,016 in 1999.

== Climate ==
Climate data for Dongning, elevation 175 m (574 ft), (1991–2020 normals, extremes 1981–2010)
Month	Jan	Feb	Mar	Apr	May	Jun	Jul	Aug	Sep	Oct	Nov	Dec	Year
Record high °C (°F)	10.3 (50.5)	15.0 (59.0)	20.7 (69.3)	32.2 (90.0)	35.3 (95.5)	36.2 (97.2)	39.0 (102.2)	37.3 (99.1)	33.0 (91.4)	30.4 (86.7)	21.3 (70.3)	12.6 (54.7)	39.0 (102.2)
Mean daily maximum °C (°F)	−7.0 (19.4)	−2.4 (27.7)	5.1 (41.2)	14.7 (58.5)	21.1 (70.0)	25.0 (77.0)	27.7 (81.9)	27.2 (81.0)	22.9 (73.2)	15.0 (59.0)	3.4 (38.1)	−5.4 (22.3)	12.3 (54.1)
Daily mean °C (°F)	−13.2 (8.2)	−8.8 (16.2)	−1.2 (29.8)	7.7 (45.9)	14.1 (57.4)	18.7 (65.7)	22.1 (71.8)	21.7 (71.1)	16.1 (61.0)	8.0 (46.4)	−2.5 (27.5)	−11.1 (12.0)	6.0 (42.8)
Mean daily minimum °C (°F)	−17.9 (−0.2)	−14.2 (6.4)	−6.8 (19.8)	1.1 (34.0)	7.9 (46.2)	13.5 (56.3)	17.6 (63.7)	17.3 (63.1)	10.5 (50.9)	2.1 (35.8)	−7.4 (18.7)	−15.5 (4.1)	0.7 (33.2)
Record low °C (°F)	−30.2 (−22.4)	−27.2 (−17.0)	−21.7 (−7.1)	−8.6 (16.5)	−0.8 (30.6)	5.8 (42.4)	10.0 (50.0)	8.0 (46.4)	−0.5 (31.1)	−10.8 (12.6)	−22.4 (−8.3)	−29.9 (−21.8)	−30.2 (−22.4)
Average precipitation mm (inches)	5.9 (0.23)	5.9 (0.23)	12.2 (0.48)	24.8 (0.98)	69.0 (2.72)	87.1 (3.43)	118.2 (4.65)	117.1 (4.61)	54.6 (2.15)	32.5 (1.28)	17.8 (0.70)	8.5 (0.33)	553.6 (21.79)
Average precipitation days (≥ 0.1 mm)	3.1	3.1	5.3	8.3	13.9	14.3	14.1	13.9	9.6	6.9	5.5	3.9	101.9
Average snowy days	4.7	4.7	6.5	2.8	0.1	0	0	0	0	1.3	5.1	5.8	31
Average relative humidity (%)	58	53	50	51	61	73	78	78	70	60	57	59	62
Mean monthly sunshine hours	169.4	187.7	216.8	205.9	217.5	218.3	206.9	198.6	219.5	204.7	160.4	153.2	2,358.9
Percentage possible sunshine	59	63	59	51	48	47	44	46	59	61	56	56	54
Source: China Meteorological Administration
