= Third Army (Japan) =

Japanese Third Army
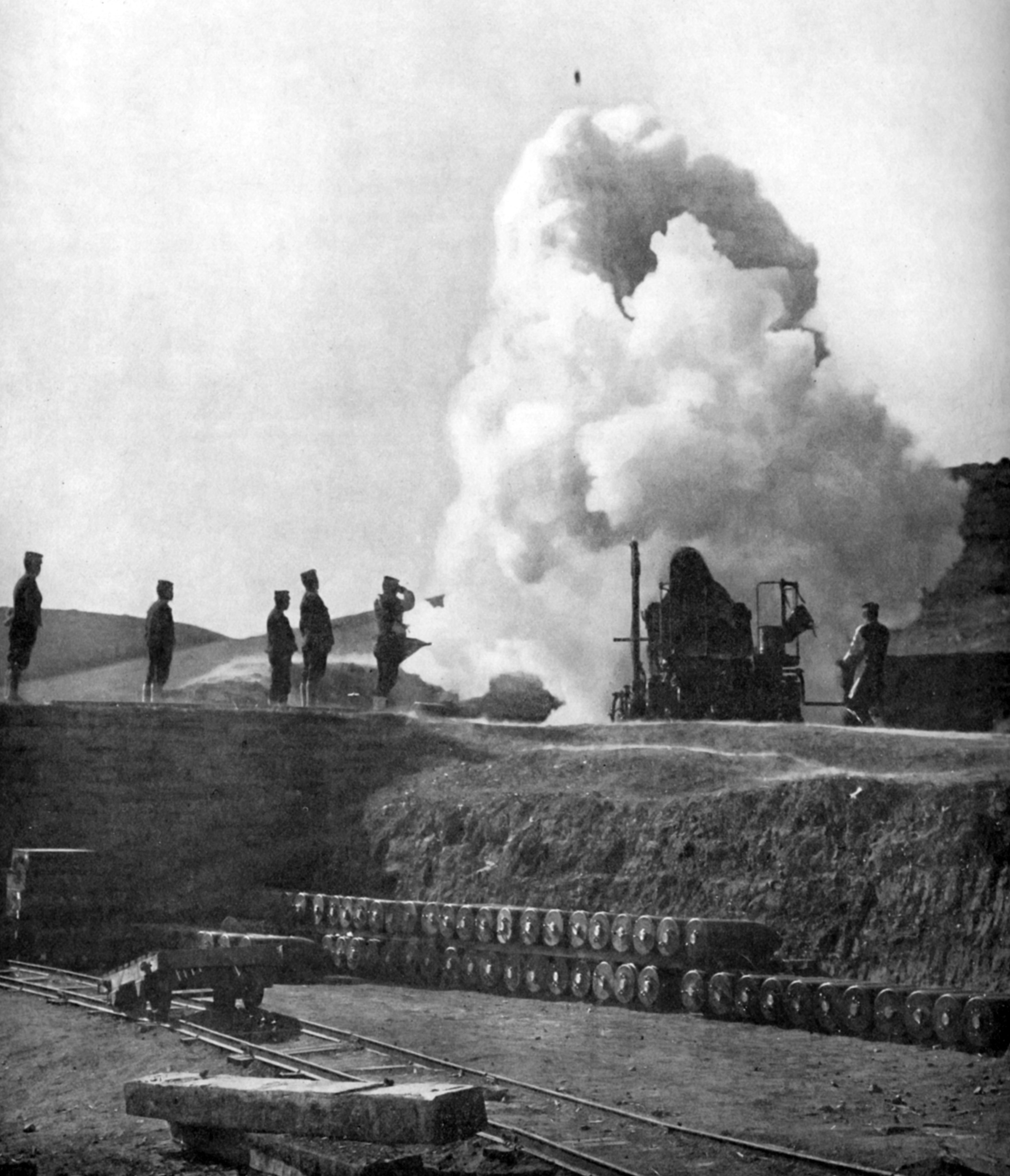
- IJA 3rd Army at Port Arthur, 1904
- Active: May 1904-August 1945
- Country: Empire of Japan
- Branch: Imperial Japanese Army
- Type: Infantry
- Role: Corps
- Garrison/HQ: Yanji, Manchukuo
- Nicknames: Iwa (岩, rock)
- Engagements: Russo-Japanese War; Soviet invasion of Manchuria

The Japanese 3rd Army (第3軍, Dai-san gun) was an army of the Imperial Japanese Army based in Manchukuo as a garrison force under the overall command of the Kwantung Army during World War II, but its history dates to the Russo-Japanese War.

== History ==
The Japanese 3rd Army was initially raised during the Russo-Japanese War under the command of General Nogi Maresuke. In the initial stages of the war, its primary mission was the Siege of Port Arthur. After the fall of that Russian stronghold, it was transferred north, where it played a crucial role in the subsequent Japanese drive towards Mukden in the closing stages of the war. It was disbanded at the end of the war.

The Japanese 3rd Army was raised again on January 13, 1938, in Manchukuo as a garrison force to guard the eastern borders against possible incursions by the Soviet Red Army. It afterwards came under the command of the Japanese First Area Army in July 1942. As the war situation deteriorated for the Japanese in southeast Asia, the more experienced units and much of the equipment of the IJA 3rd Army were transferred to other units.

During the Soviet invasion of Manchuria, its poorly trained and under-equipped forces were no match for the experienced battle-hardened Soviet Army, and it was forced back from various locations in Kirin province to the Korean border, surrendering at the end of the war in Yanji and Hunchun, in what is now part of the Yanbian Korean Autonomous Prefecture of northeast China.

== List of commanders ==
=== Commanding officer ===
	Name	From	To
1	General Nogi Maresuke	August 1904	January 1906
2	General Otozō Yamada	13 January 1938	10 December 1938
3	General Hayao Tada	10 December 1938	12 September 1939
4	General Kamezo Suetaka	12 September 1939	1 March 1941
5	General Masakazu Kawabe	1 March 1941	17 August 1942
6	Lieutenant General Eitaro Uchiyama	17 August 1942	7 February 1944
7	Lieutenant General Hiroshi Nemoto	7 February 1944	22 November 1944
8	Lieutenant General Murakami Keisaku	22 November 1944	September 1945

=== Chief of Staff ===
	Name	From	To
1	Major General Ijichi Kōsuke	August 1904	January 1905
2	Major General Masatoshi Matsunaga	February 1905	March 1905
3	Major General Ichinohe Hyoe	March 1905	January 1906
4	Lieutenant General Aketo Nakamura	20 January 1938	14 April 1938
5	Lieutenant General Teiichi Suzuki	14 April 1938	10 December 1938
6	Lieutenant General Masami Maeda	10 December 1938	9 March 1940
7	Lieutenant General Toshimichi Uemura	9 March 1940	1 April 1941
8	Lieutenant General Takezo Numata	1 April 1941	1 July 1942
9	Major General Akio Doi	1 July 1942	11 March 1943
10	Major General Tatsuhiko Takashima	11 March 1943	16 December 1944
11	Major General Hanjiro Ikeya	16 December 1944	September 1945
