= Khingan–Mukden Operation =

Campaign of the Soviet Invasion of Japanese-Occupied Manchukuo (Soviet-Japanese War)

- Part of the Soviet–Japanese War of World War II
Date	9 August – 2 September 1945
Location	Greater Khingan
Result	Soviet victory

Belligerents
Soviet Union (Mongolian People's Republic) Mongolia	(Empire of Japan) Japan; Manchukuo

Commanders and leaders
(Soviet Union) Rodion Malinovsky (Mongolian People's Republic) Zhamyangiyn Lhagvasuren	(Empire of Japan) Otozō Yamada

Strength
648,000 soldiers 9,668 guns and mortars 2,359 tanks and self-propelled guns 369 rocket launchers 1,324 aircraft	230,000 soldiers

Casualties and losses
2,228 killed	4,314 killed

Khingan–Mukden Operation was a military operation of the Red Army and the Mongolian People's Revolutionary Army against the Japanese troops during the Soviet–Japanese War. Conducted from 9 August to 2 September 1945 by troops of the Transbaikal Front with the aim of defeating the Kwantung Army in western Manchuria. It is a part of the Soviet invasion of Manchuria.

== Plan ==
On 28 June 1945, by directive of the Supreme High Command Headquarters No. 11114, the troops of the Trans-Baikal Front were given the order to prepare an offensive operation in central Manchuria. When developing an operation plan it was required:

- deliver the main blow with the forces of three combined arms (39th, 53rd, 17th) and one tank armies, bypassing the Halun-Arshan fortified area in the general direction of Changchun;
- use the bulk of artillery RGK, tanks and aviation in the direction of the main attack;
- The 6th Guards Tank Army, operating in the direction of the main attack, will overcome the Greater Khingan by the 10th day of the operation;
- deliver an auxiliary strike with the forces of the 36th Army on Hailar District;
- with the forces of the Mongolian People's Revolutionary Army, launch an auxiliary attack on Kalgan and Dolonnor;
- complete all preparations for the operation by 25 July.

As part of the entire Manchurian strategic operation, the troops at the front were given the task, together with the troops of the 1st and 2nd Far Eastern Fronts, to encircle and defeat the main forces of the Kwantung Army.

== Operation ==
External image
- Map of the Khingan–Mukden Operation

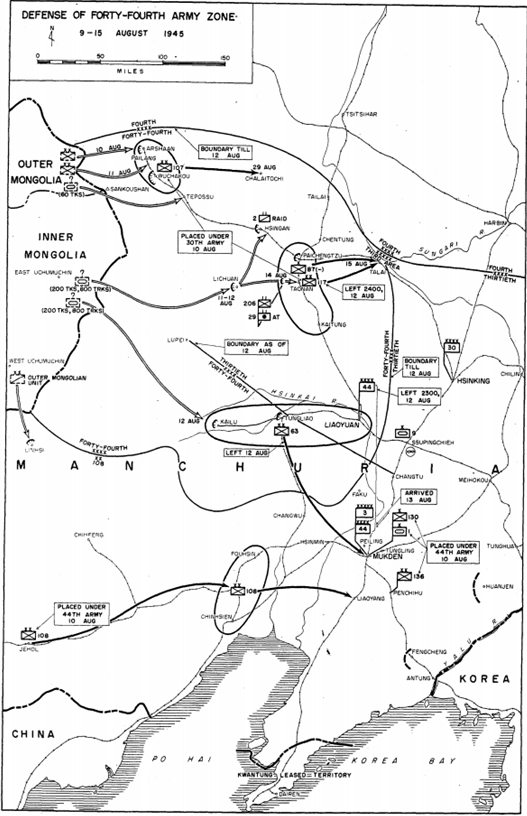
Japanese Forty-Fourth Army operations

On the night of 9 August advanced and reconnaissance detachments of Soviet troops crossed the border. At dawn, after them, the main forces of the Transbaikal Front went on the offensive. Shooting down the Japanese covering troops on the move, the attackers immediately picked up a high tempo. By the end of the day, the troops of the 17th Army advanced 50 km with their main forces, the 61st Tank Division of the 39th Army advanced 60 km. The fastest moving was the 6th Guards Tank Army, which by the end of the day was on the approaches to the Greater Khingan passes, having covered 150 km in a day. The troops of the 36th Army crossed the Argun River, overcame the Zhalaynor-Manchu fortified area and advanced almost 40 km in the direction of Hailar. The 12th Air Army carried out massive air strikes on enemy railway junctions: Halun-Arshan, Solun, Hailar District and large stations. Japanese aviation did not provide any resistance.

In the first days of the operation, the Japanese command lost control of the troops and was unable to organize lasting resistance. However, individual garrisons fought very stubbornly. Japanese troops put up fierce resistance in the area of Hailar District Relying on reinforced concrete pillboxes, the 111th Infantry Division held the line for several days. Only after the arrival of additional artillery units, including a high-power howitzer regiment, and careful preparation of the assault, Soviet troops managed to capture this fortified area.

On the sixth day of the operation, the 6th Guards Tank Army covered more than 450 km, crossed the Greater Khingan and reached deep into the rear of the Kwantung Army. The Air army (Soviet Union) provided great assistance to the tank crews, whose pilots prevented the occupation of the Greater Khingan passes by Japanese troops, delivered powerful attacks on important enemy targets in operational depth and carried out reconnaissance of routes. In general, as a result of six days of operation, Soviet and Mongolian troops overcame 250–450 km and reached the line Dolonnor, Linxi, Tao'an. The offensive of the 17th Army saved the 8th Chinese Army, which had been surrounded by Japanese troops in the area of Pingquan for more than a week, from death.

The rapid advance of the 6th Guards Tank Army led to the fact that its communications were extremely extended (up to 700 km) and army vehicles could not deliver ammunition and fuel from warehouses on time. Therefore, having reached the Lubei, Tuquan area, the 6th Guards Tank Army was forced to stop for almost two days to tighten up its rear. In the current situation, it was decided to supply the troops with the help of aviation. On 12 and 13 August the 21st Guards and 54th Transport Air Divisions, operating in difficult weather conditions and in the absence of landing sites, transferred 940 tons of fuel and lubricants to the attackers.

By 15 August the 6th Guards Tank Army resumed the offensive and developed it in Shenyang and Changchun. Behind it, remaining in the 2nd echelon of the front, moved the 53rd Army. The 36th Army fought on the approaches to Zhalantun and part of its forces eliminated the group in the Hailar fortified area. The 17th Army continued to advance in the Chifeng direction. The cavalry-mechanized group fought in the area of Kalgana. On 15–17 August, despite significant losses, the garrison of the Hailar fortified area continued to stubbornly defend itself. On 16 August a 400-km gap formed as a result of a rapid offensive between the 17th and 39th armies was introduced from the 2nd echelon of the front by the 53rd Army. She was given the task of going to the Kailu area.

The Red Army's rapid overcoming of the Greater Khingan, large rivers and deserts, suppression of resistance in fortified areas and access to the Manchurian plain confronted the Japanese command with the fact of military defeat of the Kwantung Army. On 17 August its commander-in-chief, General Yamada, invited the Soviet command to begin negotiations on a cessation of hostilities. The next morning, his order was transmitted by radio to the Japanese troops to stop resistance and surrender their weapons. After this, Japanese troops began to surrender in many sectors of the front. Resistance also ceased in the Hailar fortified area, where 3,823 soldiers and officers surrendered. The Soviet command, in turn, gave the order to cease hostilities in those areas where Japanese troops laid down their arms and surrendered.

To document the fact of the surrender of the Kwantung Army, the commander of the Transbaikal Front, R. Ya. Malinovsky, sent a special mission led by Colonel Ivan Timofeevich. On the morning of 19 August a plane with envoys landed at the Changchun military airfield and Colonel Artemenko, accompanied by officers, headed to the headquarters of the Kwantung Army. At 11 o'clock an airborne force of 500 people landed at the same airfield. Paratroopers under the command of Guard Major P. N. Avramenko quickly captured the airfield and took up a perimeter defense. After short negotiations with representatives of the Red Army, General O. Yamada signed the act of surrender of the Kwantung Army. Also, at the request of the Soviet command, General O. Yamada and the Prime Minister of Manchukuo Ch. Jing-hui spoke to the population on the radio and announced the surrender.

By the end of 19 August the troops of the Transbaikal Front reached the line of Zhangbei, Chengde, Chifeng, Shenyang, Changchun, Kaitun, Qiqihar. To speed up the surrender of the Japanese garrisons, airborne assault forces were landed in a number of large cities. 19 August in Shenyang and Jilin, 22 August in Lushun and Luida, 23 August in Yanji. Following the paratroopers, advanced detachments of ground forces approached the cities. To increase the pace of advance, Soviet troops used railway transport in certain directions. By the end of 26 August the 53rd Army reached the Laohahe and Liaohe rivers on the Xinmiao, Kailu, Tongliao line. The 36th Army reached the cities of Changchun, Siping, and Gongzhuling. After capturing Chifeng, the 17th Army concentrated its main forces in the area of Pingquan and Lingyuan, sending strong reconnaissance detachments to the coast of the Liaodong Gulf. The 6th Guards Tank Army reached the cities of Lushun, Zhuanghe, and Fuzhou by forced march.

== Losses ==
Japanese troops lost over 220,000 prisoners, 480 tanks, 500 aircraft, 860 guns.

During the operation, the Soviet Army lost 8,383 soldiers, of which 2,228 were irretrievable

== Sources ==
- Коллектив авторов. История Второй мировой войны. 1939—1945. Том одиннадцатый. — М.: Воениздат, 1979.
- Хингано-Мукденская наступательная операция на сайте «Боевые действия Красной армии в ВОВ»
- Киреев Н., Цыганков П. Особенности подготовки и ведения операций в горно-пустынной местности по опыту Забайкальского фронта в 1945 году. // Военно-исторический журнал. — 1983. — No. 8. — С.13-20.
- Гордеев Н. В., Жданова Н. Н., Бугреев В. И. Забайкальцы в Маньчжурской стратегической наступательной операции. // Военно-исторический журнал. — 2004. — No. 7. — С.12-18.
- Рипенко Ю. Б. Особенности применения артиллерии в ходе Маньчжурской стратегической наступательной операции 1945 года. // Военно-исторический журнал. — 2007. — No. 9. — С.14-17.
