= 107th Division (Imperial Japanese Army) =

- 第107師団
- Active: 1944–1945
- Country: Empire of Japan
- Allegiance: 44th army
- Branch: Imperial Japanese Army
- Type: Infantry
- Garrison/HQ: Arxan
- Nickname: Lull division
- Engagements: Soviet invasion of Manchuria

Commanders
- Notable commanders: Koichi Abe

The 107th Division (第107師団, Dai-hyakunana Shidan) was an infantry division of the Imperial Japanese Army. Its call sign was the Lull Division (凪兵団, Nagi Heidan). It was formed 16 May 1944 in Arxan as a triangular division. The nucleus for the formation was the 7th independent mixed regiment. The division was permanently assigned to the 44th army.

== Action ==
During a Soviet invasion of Manchuria the 107th division was ordered to march 600 km from Arxan to Changchun 12 August 1945. 14 August 1945, the advance elements of the 107th division were ambushed by the Soviet armoured regiment. 15 August 1945 the 107th division was cut from all communications, including radio, and fled to the Inder in Jalaid Banner mountainous region, breaking a contact with Soviet forces. The contact was re-established 25 August 1945, and the division formally surrendered 27 August 1945.

During the fighting, about 1500 division members perished. A further 2000 never returned after being taken prisoner by the Soviet Union. Although a small fraction of the prisoners returned to Japan in 1949, the majority were not released until 1956.

== See also ==
- List of Japanese Infantry Divisions

== Notes and references ==
- This article incorporates material from Japanese Wikipedia page 第107師団 (日本軍), accessed 27 June 2016
- Madej, W. Victor, Japanese Armed Forces Order of Battle, 1937–1945 [2 vols], Allentown, PA: 1981.
