= Tieshan Township, Heilongjiang =

Tieshan Township 铁山乡
- Township
- Location in Heilongjiang Tieshan Township (China)
- Coordinates: 45°44′46″N 131°10′50″E
- Country: People's Republic of China
- Province: Heilongjiang
- Prefecture-level city: Qitaihe
- District: Qiezihe District
- Time zone: UTC+8 (China Standard)

Tieshan Township (simplified Chinese: 铁山乡; traditional Chinese: 鐵山鄉; pinyin: Tiěshān Xiāng) is a township in Qiezihe District, Qitaihe, Heilongjiang, China. As of 2020, it administers the following nine villages, two forestry farms, and one development base:

- Tieshan Village
- Xinfa Village (新发村)
- Chuangxin Village (创新村)
- Lixin Village (立新村)
- Hongxing Village (红星村)
- Tiedong Village (铁东村)
- Tiexi Village (铁西村)
- Sixin Village (四新村)
- Wuxing Village (五星村)
- Tieshan Forestry Farm
- Longshan Forestry Farm (龙山林场)
- Qitaihe Mining Company Agricultural and Sideline Production Development Base (七矿农副业开发基地)
