= Harbin–Kirin Operation =

1945 Red Army operation

- Part of the Soviet invasion of Manchuria of World War II
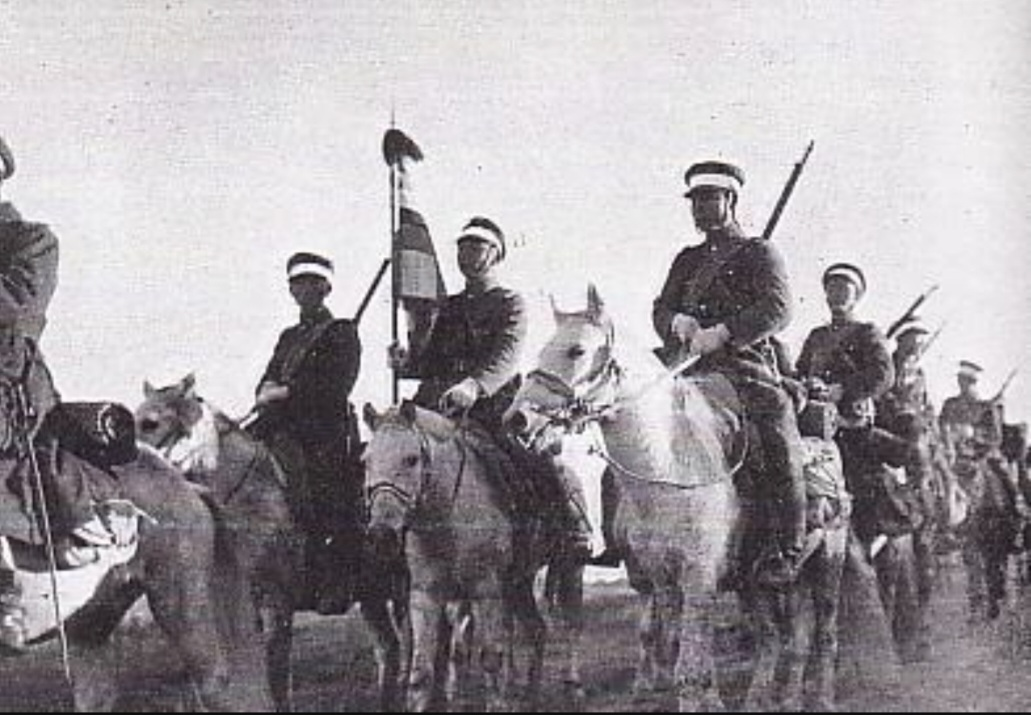
- Cavalry of Manchukuo in training
Date	9 August – 2 September 1945
Location	Harbin, Manchuria
Result	Soviet victory

Belligerents
Soviet Union	(Empire of Japan) Japan; Manchukuo

Commanders and leaders
(Soviet Union) Kirill Meretskov	(Empire of Japan) Seiichi Kita

Units involved
1st Far Eastern Front: 5th Army; 1st Red Banner Army	First Area Army: Fifth Army

Strength
589,000 soldiers 11,430 guns and mortars 274 rocket launchers 1,974 tanks and self-propelled guns 1,137 aircraft	250,000 soldiers

Casualties and losses
22,000	40,000

The Harbin–Kirin Operation (Russian: Харбино-Гиринская наступательная операция, romanized: Kharbino-Girinskaya nastupatel'naya operatsiya, lit. 'Harbin–Jirin Offensive Operation') was a military campaign conducted by the Red Army against Japanese forces during the Soviet–Japanese War. It took place from 9 August to 2 September 1945 and was carried out by troops of the 1st Far Eastern Front and the Pacific Fleet. The operation aimed to defeat the Kwantung Army in eastern Manchukuo and northern Korea. It formed part of the broader Manchurian Strategic Offensive Operation.

== Background ==
The Soviet Union and the Empire of Japan first clashed in 1939 during a series of border conflicts, culminating in the Battles of Khalkhin Gol. Due to the heavy defeats suffered at that time, Japan refrained from taking military action against the Soviet Union during World War II. The Soviet Union maintained a significant number of tanks and a large troop presence in the Far East, informed by experiences from the Russo-Japanese War. Additionally, Japan was heavily engaged in military operations in China and the Pacific, and opening another front against the USSR was considered a potentially disastrous move.

The Soviet invasion of Manchuria was initially planned for 14 August 1945, as indicated by Joseph Stalin at the Potsdam Conference. However, on 3 August, Marshal Aleksandr Vasilevsky reported to Stalin that the Soviet forces would be ready to attack Japan within two days if necessary.

The main trigger for launching the invasion earlier was the United States' dropping of the first atomic bomb on Hiroshima on 6 August, followed by a second atomic bomb on Nagasaki on 8 August. In response, Soviet forces launched a joint attack on the Japanese puppet state of Manchukuo.

On 8 August 1945, the Soviet Union declared war on the Empire of Japan. At 23:00 (Baikal time), Soviet Foreign Minister Vyacheslav Molotov delivered the declaration of war to Japanese Ambassador Naotake Satō. Ten minutes past midnight, Soviet troops crossed the border following heavy bombardment of Japanese positions in North Korea and Manchuria. The Soviets began advancing simultaneously on three fronts: from the east, north, and west (from the People's Republic of Mongolia) into Manchuria.

== Intent of the operation ==
On 28 June 1945, the troops of the Primorsky Group of Forces received Directive No. 11113 from the Headquarters of the Supreme High Command, ordering preparations for offensive operations in central Manchuria.

In developing the operational plan, it was required to:

- Deliver the main blow in the general direction of Mulin and Mudanjiang with the forces of the 1st Red Banner Army, the 5th Army, one mechanized corps, and one cavalry division, while employing the bulk of the Reserve of the Supreme High Command (RGK) artillery and tanks.
- Conduct an auxiliary strike in the direction of Mishan with the forces of the 35th Army.
- Launch an auxiliary attack with part of the 25th Army in the direction of Hunchun and Antu, with the goal of subsequently capturing the Korean ports of Ranan, Seishin, and Racine.
- Complete all preparations for the operation by 25 July.

Subsequently, as part of the broader Manchurian Strategic Offensive Operation, the front was to advance on Xinjing (present-day Changchun) and Jilin, in coordination with the Trans-Baikal Front, to encircle and defeat the main forces of the Kwantung Army.

== Composition and strengths of the parties ==
=== Soviet Union ===
1st Far Eastern Front (Commander: Marshal of the Soviet Union Kirill A. Meretskov; Chief of Staff: Lieutenant General A. N. Krutikov), comprising:

- 1st Red Banner Army (Colonel General A. P. Beloborodov)
- 5th Army (Colonel General N. I. Krylov)
- 25th Army (Colonel General I. M. Chistyakov)
- 35th Army (Colonel General N. D. Zakhvataev)
- 9th Air Army (Colonel General of Aviation I. M. Sokolov)
- Chuguev Operational Group (Lieutenant General F. A. Parusinov; later Lieutenant General V. A. Zaitsev)
- Primorsky Air Defense Army (Lieutenant General of Artillery A. V. Gerasimov)
- Front reserve:
  - 10th Mechanized Corps (Lieutenant General of Tank Forces I. D. Vasiliev)
  - 87th Rifle Corps
  - 88th Rifle Corps (Lieutenant General Lovyagin)
  - 126th Light Mountain Rifle Corps (Major General Vladimir N. Soloviev)

=== Japan ===
Part of the Kwantung Army forces (Army General Otozō Yamada), including:

- 1st Front (General Seiichi Kita):
  - 5th Army (General Noritsune Shimizu)
  - 3rd Army (Lieutenant General Keisaku Murakami)
- Part of the forces of the 17th Front (Lieutenant General Yoshio Kozuki):
  - 34th Army

The 1st Front consisted of approximately 175,000 personnel, while the 17th Front included about 150,000 personnel.

== Course of hostilities ==
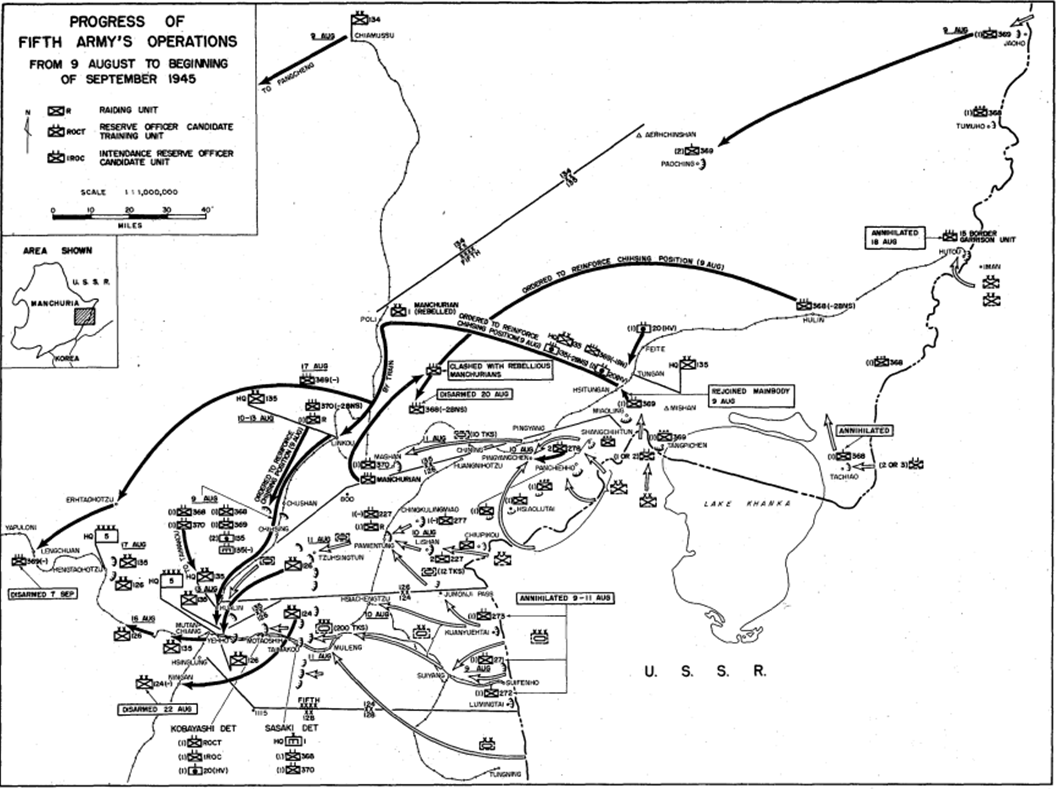
Japanese Fifth Army operations

On the night of 9 August, heavy rain began to fall in the zone of action of the front's strike group. This forced the Soviet command to adjust its operational plan. It was decided to launch the offensive under cover of darkness and bad weather, without preliminary artillery preparation.

At 1:00 a.m. on 9 August, advanced detachments of rifle troops and border guards crossed the Soviet-Chinese border. The rain, which concealed their movements, contributed to achieving surprise, allowing Soviet troops to break into fortified areas and catch the Japanese forces off guard. By morning, the advanced detachments had managed to advance 3–10 km into the Japanese defenses. At 8:30 a.m., the main forces of the front went on the offensive. By the end of the first day, the 5th Army had broken through the Suifenhe fortified area and advanced up to 23 km. The 1st Red Banner Army, advancing in the difficult mountain-taiga terrain, covered 5–6 km in a day.

The offensive of the 35th Army in an auxiliary direction began with a strong artillery attack on enemy strongholds. The main forces of the army then crossed the Ussuri and Sungacha rivers, and after overcoming a vast swampy area, reached Hutou, a major resistance hub, by the end of the day.

The offensive of the 25th Army also developed successfully. By noon on 10 August, its main forces had captured the principal Japanese defensive positions and liberated the cities of Dongning, Tumen, and Hunchun. At the same time, the army's left-flank formations, advancing along the coast of the Sea of Japan with artillery support from the Pacific Fleet, successfully overcame long-term fortifications on the Korean border. On 12 August, through joint actions of the 393rd Rifle Division and Pacific Fleet naval infantry, the port cities of Yuki and Rason (Racine) were captured. In the following days, Soviet troops captured several more settlements. The Seishin Operation, which targeted the large industrial center and naval base at Seishin (present-day Chongjin), lasted four days. With the loss of the Korean ports, the Kwantung Army was cut off from Japan.

By 14 August, Soviet troops had broken through all border fortified areas and advanced 120–150 km into Manchuria. One of the key targets on the advance was Mudanjiang, an important road junction and major city in eastern Manchuria. On 13 August, the 26th Rifle Corps, under the command of Major General A. V. Skvortsov, entered the city from the north and began street fighting. However, under pressure from Japanese counterattacks, the corps was forced to withdraw 8–10 km northeast of the city. Only on 16 August, after a four-day assault, did formations of the 1st Red Banner and 5th Armies finally capture the city, effectively splitting the 1st Front of the Kwantung Army. Having taken Mudanjiang, Soviet troops gained access to the operational depth and launched a rapid advance toward Harbin and Jilin (Kirin).

On 17 August, the mass surrender of Japanese troops began. To accelerate the surrender, airborne landings were conducted in several major cities, including Harbin, Jilin, and Pyongyang (Heijo), from 18 to 24 August. In addition, special mobile detachments were formed to capture important industrial centers quickly, preventing the Japanese from destroying or evacuating valuable assets.

Although organized resistance by Japanese forces was broken, some isolated groups, cut off from the main forces, continued to fight. These remnants were soon destroyed or taken prisoner.

== Result ==
As a result of the operation, Soviet troops defeated the opposing Japanese forces, advanced up to 300 km into the territory of Manchuria, and, in cooperation with the Pacific Fleet, liberated the northern part of the Korean Peninsula from Japanese control.

During the operation, after the Pacific Fleet entered combat in a zone previously agreed upon with the Allies, the United States laid several hundred sea mines of various types—including acoustic, hydrodynamic, and magnetic—in the waters of the ports of Rason (Racine), Gyeongseong (Gyonzan), and Seishin (Chongjin). The U.S. command did not inform the Soviet side about the minefields. After an official inquiry from the Soviet government to the U.S. naval attaché in Vladivostok, the attaché, Roulard, replied that "the coordinates of the minelaying are unknown, as they were carried out by army aviation."

On 16 August 1945, the Soviet transports Noginsk and Dalstroy struck American mines in the waters of Seishin port. Only the efforts of their crews prevented the ships from sinking.

== Sources ==
- Butow, Robert Joseph Charles (1954). Japan's Decision to Surrender. Stanford University Press. ISBN 978-0-8047-0460-1.
- Frank, Richard B. (2001). Downfall: The End of the Imperial Japanese Empire. Penguin Group (USA) Incorporated. ISBN 978-0-14-100146-3.
- Hasegawa, Tsuyoshi (2005). Racing the Enemy: Stalin, Truman, and the Surrender of Japan. Harvard University Press. ISBN 978-0-674-03840-0.
- Maddox, Robert J. (2007). Hiroshima in History: The Myths of Revisionism. University of Missouri Press. ISBN 978-0-8262-6587-6.
- Toland, John (2003). The Rising Sun: The Decline and Fall of the Japanese Empire 1936-1945. Modern Library. ISBN 978-0-81-296858-3.
- Glantz, David (2004). Soviet Operational and Tactical Combat in Manchuria, 1945: 'August Storm'. Routledge. ISBN 978-1-13-577477-6.
- David Glantz (2010). The Great Patriotic War of the Red Army. Gorizia: LEG. ISBN 978-88-6102-063-4.
- Basil H. Liddell Hart (1970). Military history of the Second World War. Milano: Oscar Storia, Mondadori. ISBN 978-88-04-42151-1.
- Gordon L. Rottmann, Akira Takizawa (2008). World War II Japanese Tank Tactics. Oxford: Osprey Publishing. ISBN 978-1-84603-234-9.
- Cesare Salmaggi, Alfredo Pallavisini (1989). World War II. Mondadori. ISBN 88-04-39248-7.
- Richard Overy (2011). Russia in War 1941-1945. il Saggiatore. ISBN 978-885650259-6.
- Tsuyoshi Hasegawa, Racing the Enemy: Stalin, Truman, and the Surrender of Japan, Belknap Press. ISBN 0-674-01693-9
