= 35th Army (Red Army) =

- 35-я армия
- Active: 1941–1945
- Country: Soviet Union
- Branch: Soviet Army
- Size: Field army
- Part of: Far Eastern Front
- Engagements: Soviet invasion of Manchuria; Harbin–Kirin Operation

Commanders
- Notable commanders: Nikanor Zakhvatayev

The 35th Army (Russian: 35-я армия) was a field army of the Soviet Workers' and Peasants' Red Army. The army was formed in July 1941 with the Far Eastern Front. After spending most of World War II guarding the border in Primorsky Krai, the army fought in the Soviet invasion of Manchuria in August 1945, and was disbanded shortly after the end of the war.

== History ==
The 35th Army was formed from the 18th Rifle Corps in July 1941, part of the Far Eastern Front. It included the 35th, 66th and 78th Rifle Divisions, the 109th Fortified Region and smaller artillery and infantry units. It defended the Soviet border in Primorsky Krai. 18th Rifle Corps commander Major General Vladimir Zaytsev became the army commander. On 1 May 1945 35th Army joined the Maritime Group of Forces. In June, Lieutenant General and Hero of the Soviet Union Nikanor Zakhvatayev became the army commander. Zaytsev was still a major general and became the army's deputy commander. The Maritime Group of Forces was transformed on 5 August 1945 to the 1st Far East Front. It had as part of its structure the 66th, 264th and 363rd Rifle Divisions, the 8th and 109th Fortified Regions, the 125th, 208th, and 209th Tank Brigades, and a number of artillery and other units. With these forces the army participated in the Harbin-Kirin Offensive Operation during the Soviet invasion of Manchuria.

During the Harbin-Kirin Offensive, the army was tasked with attacking from positions southwest of Lesozavodsk towards Mishan. The army was to defeat elements of the Kwantung Army on the left bank of the Songacha River and capture the Hutou Fortified Area. Parts of the army were assigned to defend the right bank of the Ussuri and Songacha Rivers, as well as defending railways and roads in the Guberovo and Spassk-Dalny areas. At the beginning of the offensive, the army crossed the Ussuri and Songacha Rivers using transports of the Amur Flotilla and captured Hulin. It captured Mishan on 12 August and by the end of the next day had captured Dunan. The army then captured Kentey-Alin and Boli on 16 August. The army cut off the Kwangtung Army's line of retreat at Mudanjiang. By 19 August, the army was in the Linkou County. The army was then involved in disarming surrendering Japanese soldiers. On 1 October 1945, the army became part of the Primorsky Military District and was disbanded within a month.

== Commanders ==
- Major General Vladimir Zaytsev (June 1941 – June 1945);
- Lieutenant General Nikanor Zakhvatayev (June–September 1945).
