= Nikanor Zakhvatayev =

Nikanor Dmitrievich Zakhvatayev
- Native name: Никанор Дмитриевич Захватаев
- Born: 26 July 1898; Gari, Russian Empire
- Died: 15 February 1963 (aged 64) Moscow, Soviet Union
- Allegiance: Russian Empire; Soviet Union
- Service years: 1916–1918 (Russian Empire); 1918–1960 (Soviet Union)
- Rank: colonel general
- Commands: 35th Army; 12th Guards Rifle Corps; 1st Shock Army; 4th Guards Army; 5th Combined Arms Army; Don Military District
- Conflicts: World War I; Russian Civil War; World War II; Soviet–Japanese War

Nikanor Dmitrievich Zakhvatayev (Russian: Никано́р Дми́триевич Захвата́ев; 26 July 1898 – 15 February 1963) was a Soviet general and army commander.

== Biography ==
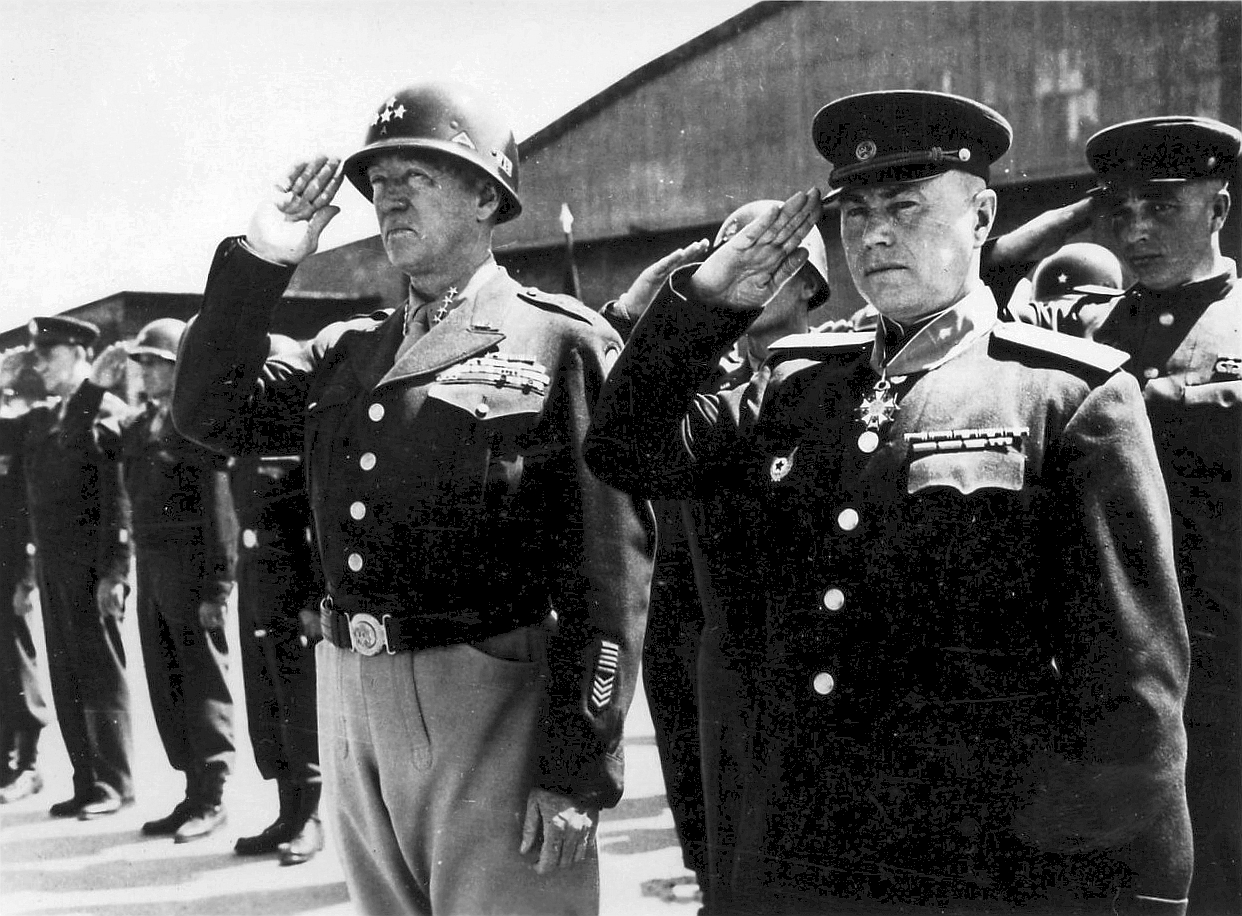
General Nikanor Zakhvatayev with General Patton in May 1945

Zakhvatayev was born in Gari in what is now Malmyzhsky District, Kirov Oblast. He fought for the Imperial Russian Army in World War I.
He received the Order of Saint Vladimir, the Order of Saint Anna, the Order of Saint Stanislaus (House of Romanov) and the Cross of St. George. He was a recipient of the Order of Lenin, the Order of the Red Banner, the Order of Suvorov and the Order of Kutuzov.

He commanded the 4th Guards Army from March to June 1945; On 28 April 1945, he was awarded the title of Hero of the Soviet Union for successfully leading his troops in the Vienna offensive. After June 1945, he was transferred to command the 35th Army in the Far East and participated in the Soviet invasion of Manchuria.

Preceded by Georgiy Zakharov	Commander of the 4th Guards Army; 1 March - 10 June 1945	Succeeded by Dmitry Gusev
