= Taoshan District =

Taoshan District 桃山区
- District
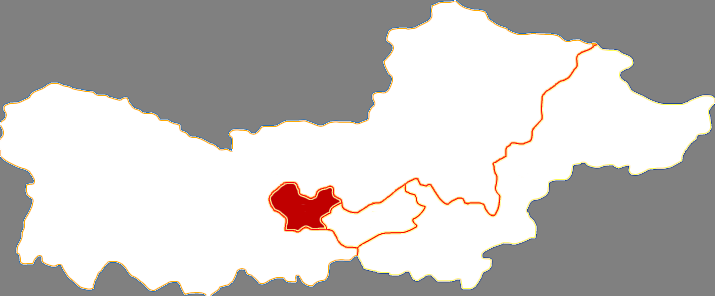
- Location in Qitaihe

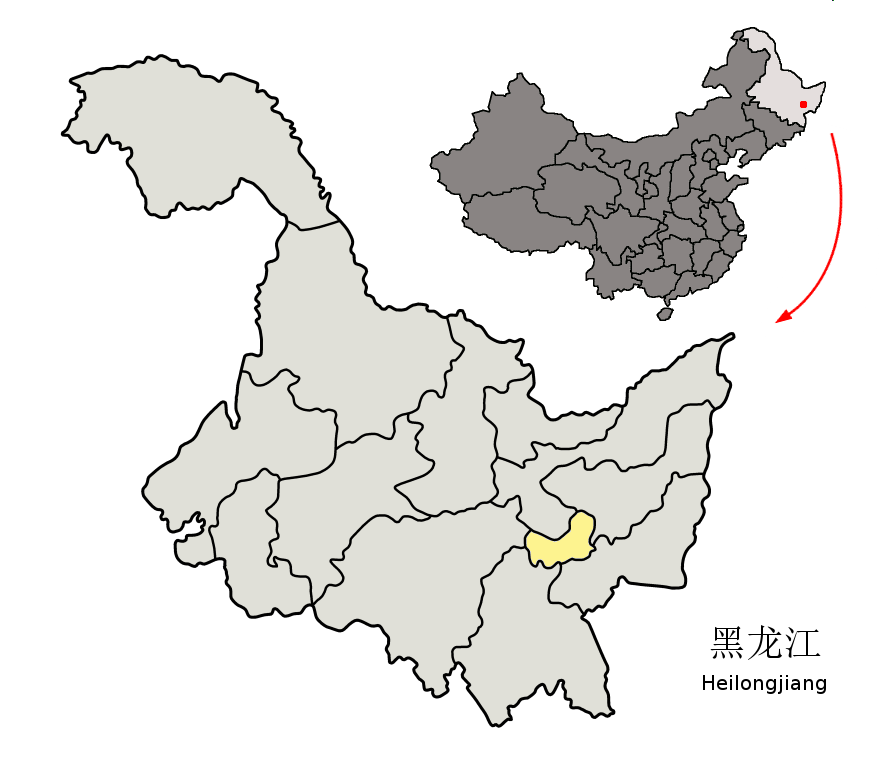
- Qitaihe in Heilongjiang
- Coordinates: 45°45′56″N 131°01′13″E
- Country: China
- Province: Heilongjiang
- Prefecture-level city: Qitaihe
- District seat: Taonan Subdistrict

Area
  - Total: 74 km^{2} (29 sq mi)

Population (2020 census)
  - Total: 204,111
  - Density: 2,800/km^{2} (7,100/sq mi)
- Time zone: UTC+8 (China Standard)
- Website: www.hljtsq.gov.cn

Taoshan District (Chinese: 桃山区; pinyin: Táoshān Qū) is a district and the seat of the city of Qitaihe, Heilongjiang province, China.

== Administrative divisions ==
Taoshan District is divided into six subdistricts and one town.

6 subdistricts

- Taodong Subdistrict (桃东街道)
- Taonan Subdistrict (桃南街道)
- Taoxi Subdistrict (桃西街道)
- Taobei Subdistrict (桃北街道)
- Taoyuan Subdistrict (桃源街道)
- Taoshan Subdistrict (桃山街道)

1 town

- Wanbaohe Town (万宝河镇)
