= Soviet invasion of Manchuria =

1945 Soviet campaign of World War II

- Part of the Soviet–Japanese War of World War II
- Soviet gains in Northeast Asia, August 1945
Date	8 August – 2 September 1945 (3 weeks and 3 days)
Location	Manchuria, Inner Mongolia, and northern Korea 49°N 125°E
Result	Soviet victory
Territorial changes	Collapse of Japanese puppet states: Partition of the Korean Peninsula at the 38th parallel; Most of Manchuria and Inner Mongolia are returned to the Nationalist government of China by a 1945 bilateral agreement; Parts of Manchuria and Inner Mongolia are secretly handed over to the Chinese Communist Party guerrillas after the Soviet withdrawal in 1946

Belligerents
Soviet Union; Mongolia	Japan; Manchukuo; Wang Jingwei regime; Mengjiang

Commanders and leaders
(Soviet Union) Aleksandr Vasilevsky; (Soviet Union) Rodion Malinovsky; (Soviet Union) Kirill Meretskov; (Soviet Union) Maksim Purkayev; (Soviet Union) Nikolay Kuznetsov; (Soviet Union) Ivan Yumashev; (Mongolian People's Republic) Khorloogiin Choibalsan; (Mongolian People's Republic) Zhamyangiyn Lhagvasuren	(Empire of Japan) Otozō Yamada (POW); (Empire of Japan) Seiichi Kita (POW); (Empire of Japan) Jun Ushiroku (POW); (Manchukuo) Puyi (POW); (Manchukuo) Zhang Jinghui (POW); (Mengjiang) Demchugdongrub

Units involved
Soviet armies: (Soviet Union) Transbaikal Front; 17th Army; 36th Army; 39th Army; 53rd Army; 6th Guards Tank Army; Mongolian Cavalry Group; 12th Air Army; (Soviet Union) 1st Far Eastern Front; 1st Red Banner Army; 5th Army; 25th Army; 35th Army; 10th Mechanized Corps; 9th Air Army; (Soviet Union) 2nd Far Eastern Front; 2nd Red Banner Army; 15th Army; 16th Army; 5th Separate Rifle Corps; Chuguevsk Group; Amur Military Flotilla; 10th Air Army	Japanese armies: (Empire of Japan) Kwantung Army; First Area Army; 3rd Army; 5th Army; Third Area Army; 30th Army; 44th Army; Independent units; 4th Army; 34th Army; Manchukuo Imperial Army; Mengjiang National Army

Strength
Soviet Union: 1,577,725 troops; 27,086 artillery pieces; 1,152 rocket launchers; 5,556 tanks and self-propelled guns; 3,721 aircraft; (Mongolian People's Republic) Mongolia: 16,000 troops; Total: 1,593,725 troops; 27,086 artillery pieces; 1,152 rocket launchers; 5,556 tanks and self-propelled guns; 3,721 aircraft	(Empire of Japan) Japan: Manchuria: 665,500 soldiers and sailors (Note: Combined with the 34th Army in northern Korea, the Kwantung Army had 713,729 troops.); 290 tanks; 1,042 aircraft (232 combat) (Note: Of this total, 188 were fighters, 9 bombers, 27 reconnaissance, 8 transports, and 810 trainers.); Korea: 335,900 soldiers and sailors ~80 tanks (Note: There was one tank regiment, the 12th, in northern Korea at that time.); 962 aircraft (395 combat); Manchukuo: 170,000–200,000 troops; Mengjiang: 44,000 troops; Total: 1,215,400–1,245,400 troops and sailors; 370 tanks; 2,004 aircraft (627 combat)

Casualties and losses
Soviet Union: 9,780–12,031 killed; 24,425 wounded; 300+ tanks destroyed; (Mongolian People's Republic) Mongolia: 72 killed; 125 wounded; Total: 9,852–12,103 killed; 24,550 wounded; 78 Soviet tanks and SPGs; 62 Soviet combat aircraft	(Empire of Japan) Japanese medical records: 21,389 killed (Note: Coox, Alvin D. Nomonhan; Japan Against Russia, 1939. 1985; 2 volumes. Stanford University Press. ISBN 0-8047-1160-7. p. 1176. 21,389 dead is from Japanese medical records; the Soviets claimed that the number of Japanese dead numbered 83,737. This number does not count POWs who died due to mistreatment in camps after the war.); Unknown captured in combat; Large amounts of equipment captured (Note: After the war, the number of Japanese soldiers and amounts of materiel in Soviet possession were as follows: 594,000–609,000 POWs, 861–925 aircraft, 369–600 tanks, 2,576–3,704 guns and mortars, and 2,129–2,300 other vehicles); Manchukuo: Most troops deserted; Mengjiang: Most troops deserted; Soviet claim: 83,737 killed; 20,000 wounded; 594,000–609,000 POWs; 861–925 aircraft; 369–600 tanks; 2,576–3,704 guns and mortars captured; 2,129–2,300 other vehicles captured (Note: Coox, Alvin D. Nomonhan; Japan Against Russia, 1939. 1985; 2 volumes. Stanford University Press. ISBN 0-8047-1160-7. p. 1176. 21,389 dead is from Japanese medical records; the Soviets claimed that the number of Japanese dead numbered 83,737. This number does not count POWs who died due to mistreatment in camps after the war.) (Note: After the war, the number of Japanese soldiers and amounts of materiel in Soviet possession are as follows: 594,000–609,000 POWs, 861–925 aircraft, 369–600 tanks, 2,576–3,704 guns and mortars, and 2,129–2,300 other vehicles)

The Soviet invasion of Manchuria, formally known as the Manchurian Strategic Offensive Operation or simply the Manchurian Operation (Маньчжурская операция), began on 8 August 1945 with the Soviet Union's invasion of the Empire of Japan's puppet states of Manchukuo and Mengjiang, in Japanese-occupied Manchuria and Inner Mongolia respectively. It was the largest campaign of the 1945 Soviet–Japanese War, which resumed hostilities between the Union of Soviet Socialist Republics and the Empire of Japan after almost six years of peace.

The invasion began two days after the atomic bombing of Hiroshima and one day before the atomic bombing of Nagasaki. The Soviet entry into the war against Japan is often considered a major factor, alongside the atomic bombings, in the Japanese government's decision to surrender unconditionally by 15 August. The Japanese government had previously hoped the Soviet Union would act as a third party, and end the Pacific War by negotiating a conditional surrender for Japan with the Western Allies. The Kwantung Army officially surrendered on 16 August, although fighting continued until 2 September, when the Japanese Instrument of Surrender was signed.

The Soviet Union occupied Manchuria as well as the Japanese Mengjiang puppet state in Inner Mongolia. The Soviet Navy also launched an amphibious assault capturing the northern half of Japanese-occupied Korea, later establishing the Soviet Civil Administration. On 14 August it signed the Sino-Soviet Treaty of Friendship and Alliance with the Kuomintang government. The resumption of full-scale conflict in the Chinese Civil War prompted the Red Army to withdraw by 3 May 1946, handing much of Manchuria and Inner Mongolia to territories controlled by the Chinese Communist Party. The Soviets continued to occupy northern Korea until 1948 and the Port Arthur naval base until 1955.

Soviet forces also captured scientists of the Kwantung Army's Unit 731 division, involved in Japanese biological warfare and chemical warfare, sentencing them in the 1949 Khabarovsk war crimes trials while allegedly using their information and experience in the Soviet biological weapons program.

== Summary ==
As agreed with the United Kingdom and the United States (Western Allies) at the Tehran Conference in November 1943 and the Yalta Conference in February 1945, the Soviet Union entered World War II's Pacific Theatre within three months of the end of the war in Europe. The invasion began on 9 August 1945, exactly three months after the German surrender on May 8 (9 May, 0:43 Moscow time).

Although the commencement of the invasion fell between the American atomic bombing of Hiroshima on 6 August, and only hours before the Nagasaki bombing on 9 August, the timing of the invasion had been planned well in advance and was determined by the timing of the agreements at Tehran and Yalta, the long-term buildup of Soviet forces in the Far East since Tehran, and the date of the German surrender some three months earlier; on August 3, Marshal Vasilevsky reported to Premier Joseph Stalin that, if necessary, he could attack on the morning of 5 August.

At 5 p.m. Moscow time (11 p.m. Trans-Baikal time (UTC+9)) on 8 August 1945, Soviet foreign minister Vyacheslav Molotov informed Japanese ambassador Naotake Satō that the Soviet Union had declared war on Japan, and that the Soviet government would consider itself to be at war with Japan. At one minute past midnight Trans-Baikal time on 9 August 1945, or just over an hour after the declaration of war, the Soviets commenced their invasion simultaneously on three fronts to the east, west and north of Manchuria:

- Khingan–Mukden Offensive Operation (9 August 1945 – 2 September 1945) (Lesser Khingan-Mukden area);
- Harbin–Kirin Offensive Operation (9 August 1945 – 2 September 1945) (Harbin-Jilin area); and
- Sungari Offensive Operation (9 August 1945 – 2 September 1945).

Though the battle extended beyond the borders traditionally known as Manchuria—that is, the traditional lands of the Manchus—the coordinated and integrated invasions of Japan's northern territories has also been called the Battle of Manchuria. It has also been referred to as the Manchurian strategic offensive operation.

== Background and buildup ==
The Russo-Japanese War of the early 20th century resulted in a Japanese victory and the Treaty of Portsmouth by which, in conjunction with other later events including the Mukden incident and Japanese invasion of Manchuria in September 1931, Japan eventually gained control of Korea, Manchuria and South Sakhalin. In the late 1930s there were a number of Soviet-Japanese border incidents, the most significant being the Battle of Lake Khasan (Changkufeng Incident, July–August 1938) and the Battle of Khalkhin Gol (Nomonhan Incident, May–September 1939), which led to the Soviet–Japanese Neutrality Pact of April 1941. The Neutrality Pact freed up forces from the border incidents and enabled the Soviets to concentrate on their war with Germany, and the Japanese to concentrate on their southern expansion into Asia and the Pacific Ocean.

With success at Stalingrad, and the eventual defeat of Germany becoming increasingly certain, the Soviet attitude to Japan changed, both publicly, with Stalin making speeches denouncing Japan, and covertly with the building up of forces and supplies in the Far East. At the Tehran Conference in November 1943, Joseph Stalin, Winston Churchill, and Franklin D. Roosevelt agreed that the Soviet Union would enter the war against Japan once Germany was defeated. Stalin faced a dilemma: he wanted to avoid a war on two fronts at almost any cost, yet he also saw an opportunity to secure gains in the Far East on top of those he expected in Europe. The only way Stalin could ensure these gains without a two-front war would be for Germany to capitulate before Japan.

Due to the Soviet–Japanese Neutrality Pact, the Soviets made it official policy to intern Allied aircraft and crews who landed in Soviet territory following operations against Japan. However, the Soviets and Western Allies soon came to informal arrangements to circumvent official policy. Under the auspices of Lend-Lease, the Allies officially transferred aircraft of the same types interned by the Soviets in the Far East, the mutual understanding being that the Soviets would also be able use "interned" Allied aircraft against the Germans without revealing their true origins. In return, Allied airmen held in the Soviet Union were usually transferred to camps near Iran or other Allied-controlled territory, from where they were typically allowed to "escape" after some period of time. Nevertheless, the Soviet buildup in the Far East steadily accelerated even before the defeat of Germany. By early 1945 it had become apparent to the Japanese that the Soviets were preparing to invade Manchuria, though they correctly calculated that they were unlikely to attack prior to Germany's defeat. In addition to their problems in the Pacific, the Japanese realized the need to determine when and where a Soviet invasion would occur.

At the Yalta Conference in February 1945, Stalin secured Roosevelt's acceptance of Soviet expansion in the Far East, in return for agreeing to enter the Pacific war within two or three months after the defeat of Germany. By the middle of March, things were not going well in the Pacific for the Japanese, and they had withdrawn their elite troops from Manchuria to support actions in the Pacific. Meanwhile, the Soviets continued their Far Eastern buildup, having decided that they did not wish to renew the Neutrality Pact. The terms of the Pact required a notification of expiry 12 months ahead of time, so on 5 April 1945 the Soviets ostensibly obliged, informing the Japanese that they did not wish to renew the treaty. This caused the Japanese considerable concern, but the Soviets went to great efforts to assure the Japanese that the treaty would still be in force for another twelve months, and that the Japanese had nothing to worry about.

Germany surrendered just after midnight Moscow time on 9 May 1945, meaning that if the Soviets were to honor the agreement at Yalta, they would need to enter the war with Japan by 9 August. The situation continued to deteriorate for the Japanese, now the only Axis power left in the war. They were keen to stay at peace with the Soviets, and ultimately to achieve an end to the war. Since Yalta, they had repeatedly tried to convince the Soviets to extend the Neutrality Pact, as well as attempting to enlist them to mediate peace negotiations with the Western Allies. The Soviets did nothing to discourage these overtures, instead happy to draw out the process for as long as possible whilst continuing to prepare their invasion forces. One of the goals of Admiral Baron Suzuki's cabinet upon taking office in April was to try to secure any peace terms whatsoever short of unconditional surrender. In late June, they once again approached the Soviets, inviting them to mediate with the Western Allies in support of Japan, providing them with specific proposals. In exchange, they were prepared to offer the Soviets very attractive territorial concessions. Stalin ostensibly expressed interest, and the Japanese now awaited an official Soviet response, even as the Soviets continued to deliberately avoid providing one. The Potsdam Conference was held from 16 July to 2 August; on 24 July the Soviet Union recalled all its embassy staff and families from Japan. On 26 July the conference produced the Potsdam Declaration whereby Churchill, Harry S. Truman and Chiang Kai-shek demanded Japan's unconditional surrender. The Japanese avoided responding to the declaration, instead continuing to wait on a clarifying Soviet reply.

The Japanese had been monitoring Trans-Siberian Railway traffic and Soviet activity to the east of Manchuria. In conjunction with the delaying tactics, this suggested that the Soviets would not be ready to invade east Manchuria before the end of August. The Japanese did not have any concrete evidence as to when or where any invasion would occur. They had estimated that an attack was not likely before the spring of 1946, but the Stavka had in fact been planning for a mid-August offensive, successfully concealing the buildup of a force of 90 divisions. Many Soviet units had crossed Siberia in their vehicles to avoid straining the rail link.

The Japanese were caught completely by surprise upon receiving the Soviet declaration of war an hour before midnight on 8 August, now facing a simultaneous invasion on three fronts that began just after midnight on 9 August.

== Combatants ==
=== Soviets ===
The Far East Command, under Marshal of the Soviet Union Aleksandr Vasilevsky, had a plan to conquer Manchuria that was simple but huge in scale, calling for a massive pincer movement over all of Manchuria. This was to be performed by the Transbaikal Front from the west and by the 1st Far Eastern Front from the east; the 2nd Far Eastern Front was to attack the center of the pocket from the north. The only Soviet equivalent of a theater command that operated during the war (apart from the short-lived 1941 "Directions" in the west), Far East Command, consisted of three Red Army fronts.

==== Transbaikal Front ====
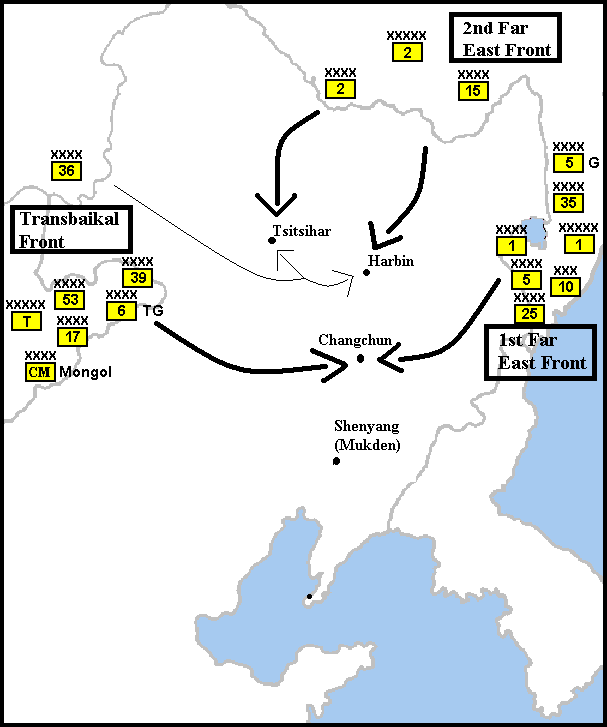
Basic map showing the Soviet invasion plan for Manchuria

The Transbaikal Front, under Marshal Rodion Malinovsky, included:

- 17th Army
- 36th Army
- 39th Army
- 53rd Army
- 6th Guards Tank Army
- Soviet Mongolian Cavalry Mechanized Group under Issa Pliyev
- 12th Air Army.

The Transbaikal Front was to form the western half of the Soviet pincer movement, attacking across the Inner Mongolian desert and over the Greater Khingan mountains. These forces had as their objectives firstly to secure Mukden (present day Shenyang), then to meet troops of the 1st Far Eastern Front at the Changchun area in south central Manchuria, and in doing so finish the pincer movement.

Amassing over one thousand tanks and self-propelled guns, the 6th Guards Tank Army was to serve as an armored spearhead, leading the Front's advance and capturing objectives 350 km (220 mi) inside Manchuria by the fifth day of the invasion.

The 36th Army was also attacking from the west, but with the objective of meeting forces of the 2nd Far Eastern Front at Harbin and Qiqihar.

==== 1st Far Eastern Front ====
The 1st Far Eastern Front, under Marshal Kirill Meretskov, included:

- 1st Red Banner Army
- 5th Army
- 25th Army
- 35th Army
- 10th Mechanized Corps
- 9th Air Army.

The 1st Far Eastern Front was to form the eastern half of the pincer movement. This attack involved the 1st Red Banner Army, the 5th Army and the 10th Mechanized Corps striking towards Mudanjiang (or Mutanchiang). Once that city was captured, this force was to advance towards the cities of Jilin (or Kirin), Changchun and Harbin. Its final objective was to link up with the forces of the Transbaikal Front at Changchun and Jilin thus closing the double envelopment movement.

As a secondary objective, the 1st Far Eastern Front was to prevent Japanese forces from escaping to Korea, and then invade the Korean Peninsula up to the 38th parallel, establishing in the process what later became North Korea. This secondary objective was to be carried out by the 25th Army. Meanwhile, the 35th Army was tasked with capturing the cities of Boli (or Poli), Linkou and Mishan.

==== 2nd Far Eastern Front ====
The 2nd Far Eastern Front, under General Maksim Purkayev, included:

- 2nd Red Banner Army
- 15th Army
- 16th Army (whose 56th Rifle Corps was its only formation to see combat, on South Sakhalin)
- 5th Separate Rifle Corps
- Chuguevsk Operational Group
- Amur Military Flotilla
- 10th Air Army

The 2nd Far Eastern Front was deployed in a supporting attack role. Its objectives were the cities of Harbin and Qiqihar, and to prevent an orderly withdrawal to the south by the Japanese forces. The front also included the 88th Separate Rifle Brigade, composed of Chinese and Korean guerrillas of the Northeast Anti-Japanese United Army who had retreated into the USSR in the beginning of the 1940s. The unit, led by Zhou Baozhong, was set to participate in the invasion for use in sabotage and reconnaissance missions, but was considered too valuable to be sent into the battlefield. They were thus withheld from participating in combat and instead used for leadership and administrative positions for district offices and police stations in the liberated areas during the subsequent occupation. The Korean battalion of the brigade (including future leader of the DPRK, Kim Il Sung) were also sent to assist in the following occupation of Northern Korea as part of the 1st Far Eastern Front.

Once troops from the 1st Far Eastern Front and Transbaikal Front captured the city of Changchun, the 2nd Far Eastern Front was to attack the Liaotung Peninsula and seize Port Arthur (present day Lüshun).

Soviet forces under the Far East Command
	Total	Transbaikal Front	1st Far East Front	2nd Far East Front
Men	1,577,725	654,040	586,589	337,096
Artillery pieces	27,086	9,668	11,430	5,988
Multiple rocket launchers	1,171	583	516	72
Tanks and self-propelled guns	5,556 (Note: Soviet sources give 4,841 tanks and 1,393 self-propelled guns as fit for service on 5 August 1945 in the Far East. These were a most varied fleet to be found anywhere, and included pre-war BT-5 fast tanks alongside IS-2 heavy tanks and Lend-Lease Sherman M4A2 tanks.)	2,416	1,860	1,280
Aircraft	3,721	1,324	1,137	1,260

Each front had "front units" attached directly to the front instead of an army. The forces totaled 89 divisions with 1.5 million men, 3,704 tanks, 1,852 self propelled guns, 85,819 vehicles and 3,721 aircraft. Approximately one-third of its strength was in combat support and services. The Soviet plan incorporated all of the experience in maneuver warfare that they had acquired in fighting the Germans.

=== Japanese ===
The Kwantung Army of the Imperial Japanese Army, under General Otozo Yamada, was the major part of the Japanese occupation forces in Manchuria and Korea, and consisted of two Area Armies and three independent armies:

- First Area Army (northeastern Manchukuo), including:
  - 3rd Army
  - 5th Army
- Third Area Army (southwestern Manchukuo), including:
  - 30th Army
  - 44th Army
- Independent units:
  - 4th Army (an independent field army responsible for northern Manchuria)
  - 34th Army (an independent field army responsible for the areas between the Third and Seventeenth Area Armies in northern Korea)
  - Seventeenth Area Army (responsible for Korea; assigned to the Kwantung Army at the eleventh hour, to no avail)

Each Area Army (Homen Gun, the equivalent of a Western "army") had headquarters units and units attached directly to the Area Army, in addition to the field armies (the equivalent of a Western corps). In addition, the Japanese were assisted by the forces of their puppet states of Manchukuo and Mengjiang. Manchukuo had an army of about 170,000 to 200,000 troops, while Mengjiang had around 44,000 troops, with the majority of these puppet troops being of dubious quality. Korea, the next target for the Soviet Far East Command, was garrisoned by the Japanese Seventeenth Area Army.

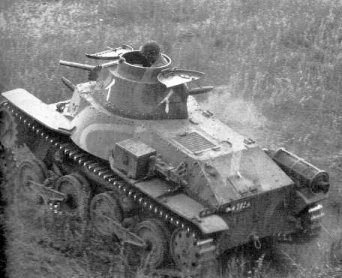
An IJA Type 95 Ha-Go of the Manchuria Tank School

Including the Japanese forces in Korea, the Kwantung Army had over 900,000 men in 31 divisions and 13 brigades; there were about 400 obsolescent tanks and 2,000 aircraft (of the 1040 aircraft in Manchuria, only 230 were combat types and 55 were modern). However, the Kwantung Army was far below its authorized strength; most of its heavy equipment and all of its best military units had transferred to the Pacific Theater over the previous three years to contend with the advance of American forces. Some Kwantung Army units had also re-deployed south against the Nationalist Chinese in Operation Ichigo in 1944. By 1945 the Kwantung Army contained a large number of raw recruits and conscripts, with generally obsolete, light, or otherwise limited equipment. Almost all of the tanks were early 1930s models such as the Type 95 Ha-Go and Type 89 I-Go, the anti-tank units only possessed Type 1 37 mm anti-tank guns that were ineffective against Soviet armor, and the infantry had very few machine-guns and no anti-materiel rifles or submachine guns. As a result, the Japanese forces in Manchuria and Korea had essentially been reduced to a light-infantry counter-insurgency force with limited mobility and limited ability to fight a conventional land war against a coordinated enemy. In fact, only six of the Kwantung Army's divisions existed prior to January 1945. Accordingly, the Japanese regarded none of the Kwantung Army's units as combat ready, with some units being declared less than 15% ready.

The Imperial Japanese Navy did not contribute to the defense of Manchuria, the occupation of which it had always opposed on strategic grounds. Additionally, by the time of the Soviet invasion, the few remnants of its fleet were stationed and tasked for the defense of the Japanese home islands in the event of an invasion by American forces.

Compounding their problems, the Japanese military made many wrong assumptions and major mistakes, most significantly:

- They wrongly assumed that any attack coming from the west would follow either the old railway line to Hailar, or head into Solun from the eastern tip of Mongolia. The Soviets did attack along those routes, but their main attack from the west went through the supposedly impassable Greater Khingan range south of Solun and into the center of Manchuria.
- Japanese military intelligence failed to determine the nature, location and scale of the Soviet buildup in the Soviet Far East. Based upon an initial underestimation of Soviet strength and on the monitoring of Soviet traffic on the Trans-Siberian railway, the Japanese believed that the Soviets would not have sufficient forces in place for an offensive before the end of August 1945, and that an attack was most likely in the autumn of 1945 or in the spring of 1946.

Due to the withdrawal of the Kwantung Army's elite forces for redeployment into the Pacific Theater, the Japanese made new operational plans during the summer of 1945 for the defence of Manchuria against a seemingly inevitable Soviet attack. These called for redeploying the bulk of available forces from the border areas; the borders were to be held lightly and delaying actions were to be fought while the main force was to hold the southeastern corner in strength (so defending Korea from attack).

Further, the Japanese had observed Soviet activity only on the Trans-Siberian railway and along the east Manchurian front, and accordingly prepared for an invasion from the east. They believed that when an attack occurred from the west, the redeployed forces would be able to deal with it.

Although the Japanese redeployment in Manchukuo had begun, it was not due for completion until September 1945, and hence the Kwantung Army was in the midst of redeploying when the Soviets launched their attack simultaneously on all three fronts.

== Campaign ==
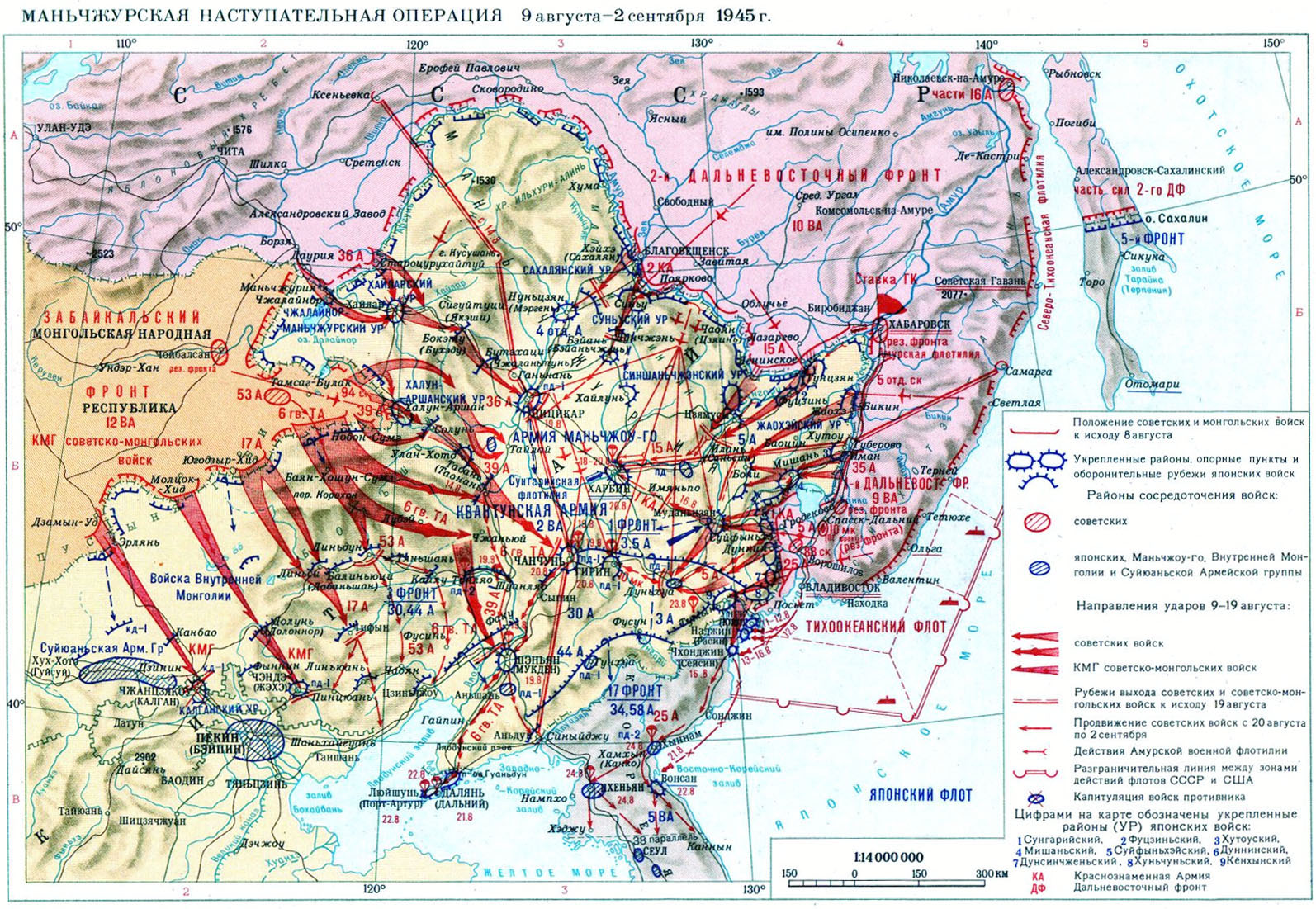
Manchurian offensive

The operation was carried out as a classic double pincer movement over an area the size of the entire Western European theatre of World War II. In the western pincer, the Red Army advanced over the deserts and mountains from Mongolia, far from their resupply railways. This confounded the Japanese military analysis of Soviet logistics, and the defenders were caught by surprise in unfortified positions. The Kwantung Army commanders were engaged in a planning exercise at the time of the invasion, and were away from their forces for the first eighteen hours of conflict.

The Soviets treated the Japanese harshly after their deadly attack on Japan's Kwantung Army in Manchuria. Japanese forces were overwhelmed by Soviet attacks. Soviet paratroopers destroyed the Kwantung Army from behind its own lines, while Japanese anti-tank shells bounced off the sides of Soviet tanks. The Japanese forces in Manchuria retreated in fear.

Japanese troops and able-bodied Japanese men in Manchuria were taken prisoner by the Soviets and transported to labor camps in Siberia, where many Japanese men would die. From the Soviets' perspective, this was seen as revenge for Russia's defeat in the Russo-Japanese War of 1905. The stories of how poorly the Soviets treated the Japanese were brought to Beijing by Japanese evacuees of Manchuria, creating panic among the Japanese population; however, the Soviets honored their agreement with Chiang Kai-shek by not entering China proper.

Japanese communication infrastructure was poor, and the Japanese lost communication with forward units very early on. However, the Kwantung Army had a formidable reputation as fierce and relentless fighters, and even though understrength and unprepared, put up strong resistance at the town of Hailar which tied down some of the Soviet forces. The Japanese defenders held out until 18 August, when 3,827 survivors surrendered. At the same time, Soviet airborne units seized airfields and city centers in advance of the land forces, and aircraft ferried fuel to those units that had outrun their supply lines.

Due to Japanese 37mm and 47mm anti-tank guns being only suitable for fighting light Soviet tanks, Japanese forces decided to use suicide bomber squads strapped with grenades and explosives as their main improvised anti-tank weapon. Soviet troops subsequently dubbed their Japanese opponents as Smertniks, 'condemned men'.

Japanese Army aviation employed several kamikaze attacks to strike Soviet armoured targets and fortifications in attempt to stop the Soviet advance.

Nevertheless, the prospect of a quick defeat to the Japanese Army seemed far from clear. Given the fanatical and sometimes suicidal resistance put up by the Japanese forces similar in April–June 1945 Battle of Okinawa, there was every reason to believe that a long, difficult campaign for the capture of the last remaining Japanese fortified areas was expected. In some parts of the Soviet offensive these expectations were fulfilled.

The Soviet pincer from the east crossed the Ussuri and advanced around Khanka Lake and attacked towards Suifenhe, and although Japanese defenders fought hard and provided strong resistance, the Soviets proved overwhelming.

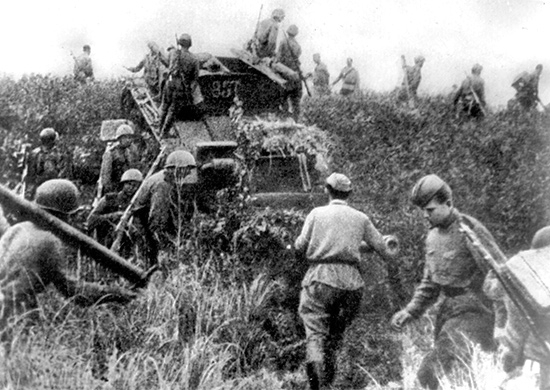
Soviet troops crossing into Manchuria, 9 August 1945

After a week of fighting, during which time Soviet forces had penetrated deep into Manchukuo, Japan's Emperor Hirohito recorded the Hirohito surrender broadcast which was broadcast on radio to the Japanese nation on 15 August 1945. It made no direct reference to a surrender of Japan, instead stating that the government had been instructed to accept the terms of the Potsdam Declaration fully. This created confusion in the minds of many listeners who were not sure if Japan had surrendered. The poor audio quality of the radio broadcast, as well as the formal courtly language in which the speech was composed, worsened the confusion.

The Imperial Japanese Army Headquarters did not immediately communicate the cease-fire order to the Kwantung Army, and many elements of the army either did not understand it, or ignored it. Hence, pockets of fierce resistance from the Kwantung Army continued, and the Soviets continued their advance, largely avoiding the pockets of resistance, reaching Mukden, Changchun and Qiqihar by 20 August. The cease-fire order was eventually communicated to the Kwantung Army, but not before the Soviets had made most of their territorial gains.

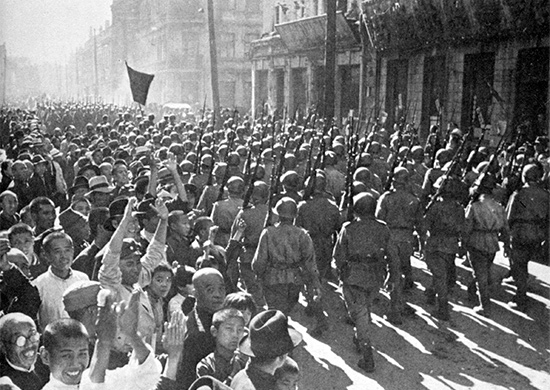
Soviet troops enter the city of Harbin following its liberation on 21 August 1945

On the Soviet right flank, the Soviet-Mongolian Cavalry-Mechanized Group entered Inner Mongolia and quickly took Dolon Nur and Kalgan. The Emperor of Manchukuo (and former Emperor of China), Puyi, was captured by the Red Army.

On August 18, several Soviet amphibious landings were conducted ahead of the land advance: three landings in northern Korea, one landing in South Sakhalin, and one landing in the Kuril Islands. This meant that, in Korea at least, there were already Soviet soldiers waiting for the troops coming overland. In South Sakhalin and the Kurils, it meant a sudden establishment of Soviet sovereignty.

The land advance was stopped a good distance short of the Yalu River, the start of the Korean Peninsula, when even aerial supply became unavailable. The forces already in Korea were able to establish control in the peninsula's northern area. In accordance with arrangements made earlier with the American government to divide the Korean Peninsula, Soviet forces stopped at the 38th parallel, leaving the Japanese still in control of the southern part of the peninsula. Later, on 8 September 1945, American forces landed at Incheon.

== Aftermath ==
Soviet Red Army Martyrs Cemetery built in Manzhouli after the war

The invasion of Manchuria was a factor that contributed to the surrender of Japan and the end of World War II.

In September 1945, the Chinese Communist Party (CCP) dispatched soldiers to Soviet-occupied Manchuria. The CCP obtained Japanese arms with Soviet help. The Soviet stance regarding the CCP and the Chinese Nationalists oscillated during this period, and in November 1945 the Soviet Union requested that the CCP withdraw from major cities in Manchuria.

The Soviet occupation of Manchuria, along with the northern portions of the Korean Peninsula, allowed for parts of those regions to be transferred by the Soviet Union into the control of local communists after the Soviet withdrawal in 1946 in spite of a 1945 agreement signed between the Soviets and the Kuomintang. The control of these regions by communist governments backed by Soviet authorities would be a factor in the rise of the CCP and shape the political conflict of the Korean War.

Several thousand Japanese who were sent as colonizers to Manchukuo and Inner Mongolia were left behind in China. The majority of Japanese left behind in China were women, and these Japanese women mostly married Chinese men and became known as "stranded war wives" (zanryu fujin). Because they had children fathered by Chinese men, Japanese women were not allowed to bring their Chinese families back with them to Japan, so most of them stayed. Japanese nationality laws allowed only children fathered by Japanese fathers to become Japanese citizens.

In late 1949, numerous members of the former Kwantung Army who had been captured in the Soviet invasion of Manchuria were convicted in connection with the activities of Unit 731, and related units for their connections with crimes against humanity and the use of chemical and biological weapons.

== War crimes ==
During the invasion of Manchuria, Soviet soldiers killed and raped Japanese civilians. The most famous example was the Gegenmiao massacre, Soviet soldiers from an armoured unit massacred over one thousand Japanese women and children. Property of the Japanese was also looted by the Soviet troops. Soviet forces responsible for the massacre had carried out the same crimes against civilians in East Prussia.

According to Soviet historian Vyacheslav Zimonin, many Japanese settlers committed mass suicide as the Red Army approached. Mothers were forced by the Japanese military to kill their own children before being killed themselves. The Japanese army often took part in the killings of its civilians. The commander of the 5th Japanese Army, General Shimizu, commented that "each nation lives and dies by its own laws." Wounded Japanese soldiers who were incapable of moving on their own were often left to die as the army retreated.

British and U.S. reports indicate that the Soviet troops that occupied Manchuria (about 700,000) also looted and terrorized the local people of Mukden and were not discouraged by Soviet authorities from "three days of rape and pillage." In Harbin, Soviet forces ignored protests from Chinese Communist Party leaders on the mass rape and looting. There were several incidents in which Chinese police forces in Manchuria arrested or even killed Soviet troops for committing various crimes, leading to some conflicts between the Soviet and Chinese authorities in Manchuria.

During the Soviet occupation of North Korea, it was reported that Soviet soldiers committed rape against both Japanese and Korean women alike in the northern half of the Korean peninsula. Soviet soldiers also looted the property of both Japanese and Koreans living in northern Korea. The Soviets laid claim to Japanese enterprises in Manchuria and northern Korea and took valuable materials and industrial equipment.

Konstantin Asmolov of the Center for Korean Research of the Russian Academy of Sciences dismisses Western accounts of Soviet violence against civilians in the Far East as exaggeration and rumor and contends that accusations of mass crimes by the Red Army inappropriately extrapolate isolated incidents regarding the nearly 2,000,000 Soviet troops in the Far East into mass crimes. According to him, such accusations are refuted by the documents of the time, from which it is clear that such crimes were far less of a problem than in Germany. Asmolov further asserts that the Soviets prosecuted their perpetrators while prosecution of German and Japanese "rapists and looters" in World War II was virtually unknown.

After her company (355th Independent Guards Naval Infantry Battalion of the Pacific Fleet) was forced to retreat from the Korean port of Seishin on the night of August 15, Soviet medic Mariya Tsukanova stayed behind with a group of fighters to support the withdrawal. Despite being wounded, she killed more than 90 Japanese soldiers with an automatic weapon. She was captured unconscious and tortured by the Japanese, who tried to extract information about the composition of the landing force (they cut her with knives and gouged out her eyes). A Japanese officer then cut off Maria's hands and beheaded her. She was buried in a mass grave of Soviet soldiers in Chongqing and was posthumously awarded the title Hero of the Soviet Union on 14 September 1945, becoming the only woman who fought in the Soviet–Japanese War to be awarded the title.

== See also ==
- Foreign interventions by the Soviet Union
- Japanese settlers in Manchuria
- Military history of Japan
- Military history of the Soviet Union
- Mongolia in World War II
- Russian invasion of Manchuria
- Outer Manchuria
- Soviet invasion of Xinjiang
- War crimes in Manchukuo
- Kyūjō incident
- Surrender of Japan
