= Solun, Horqin Right Front Banner =

Solun 索伦镇 Suolun
- Town
- Location within Inner Mongolia
- Coordinates: 46°37′10″N 121°14′36″E
- Country: China
- Region: Inner Mongolia
- League: Hinggan
- Banner: Horqin Right Front Banner

Area
  - Total: 1,500 km^{2} (580 sq mi)
- Elevation: 491 m (1,611 ft)

Population
  - Total: 19,500
  - Density: 13/km^{2} (34/sq mi)
  - Hukou permits: 6,010
- Time zone: UTC+8 (China Standard)

Solun (simplified Chinese: 索伦; traditional Chinese: 索倫; pinyin: Suǒlún) is a town in the Hinggan League, of northeastern Inner Mongolia, People's Republic of China, located 120 kilometres (75 mi) northwest, by road, of the city of Ulan Hot. Its name in the Mongolian language means "hunted paddock or hunting paddock", which could derive from the fact that the Kangxi Emperor (ruled 1661–1722) of the Qing Dynasty often came here to hunt, after being impressed by the local topography, purple appearance of the environs, valleys enclosed by lofty mountains, and three rivers.

== Geography and transport ==
Solun has an area of 1,500 square kilometres (580 sq mi), and is located in a valley in the Greater Khingan Range. The area's climate is harsh, with only 90 to 105 frost-free days per annum. The three rivers crossing through the town's administrative area are the Tao'er River (洮儿河), Hagan River (哈干河), and the Manchu River (满族河). Important transport links include the Baicheng–Alxan Railway (白阿铁路) and the Inner Mongolia Provincial Highway 203, connecting the town with Baicheng (Jilin) and Ulan Hot.

== Demographics ==
Solun has a total population of 19,500, and the registered population (i.e. those with hukou permits) numbers 6,500. Around 40% of the population consists of Mongols, the other ethnic groups being the Han, Manchus, Koreans, Daurs, Oroqen, Evenks (Solon), and the Hui.
