= Qiezihe District =

Qiezihe District 茄子河区
- District
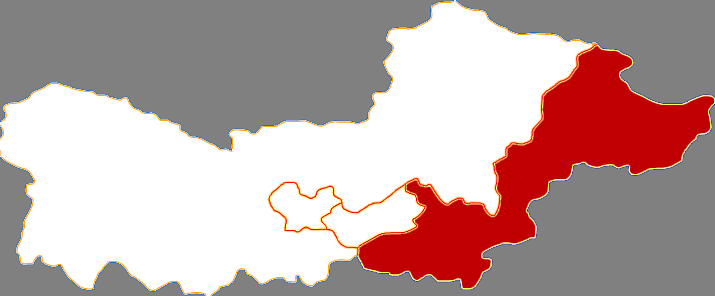
- Location in Qitaihe

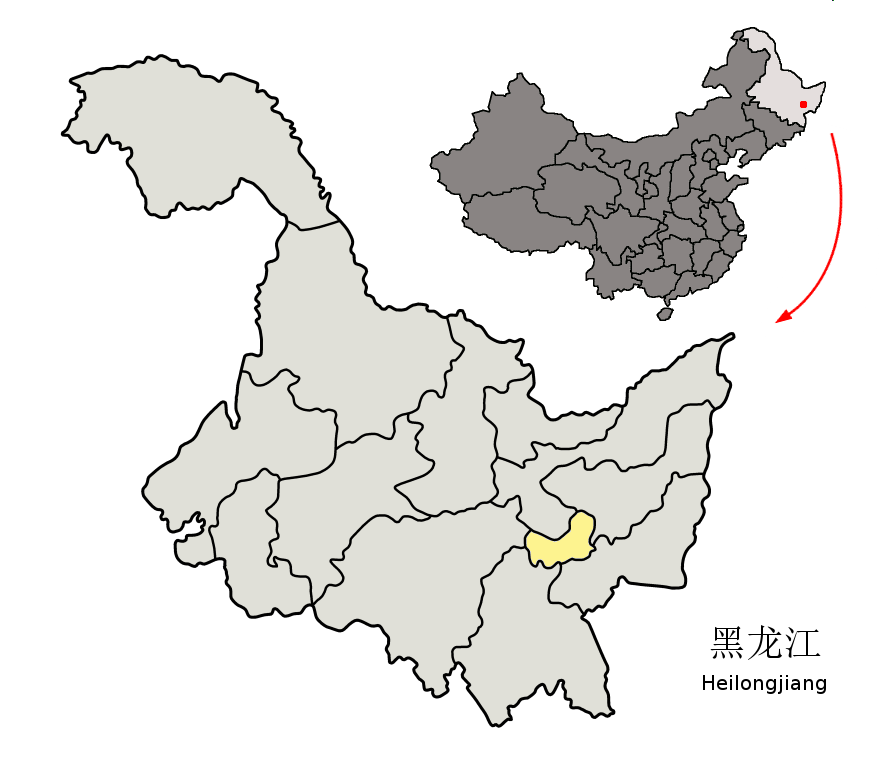
- Qitaihe in Heilongjiang
- Coordinates: 45°47′07″N 131°04′06″E
- Country: People's Republic of China
- Province: Heilongjiang
- Prefecture-level city: Qitaihe

Area
  - Total: 1,569 km^{2} (606 sq mi)

Population (2010)
  - Total: 153,874
  - Density: 98.07/km^{2} (254.0/sq mi)
- Time zone: UTC+8 (China Standard)

Qiezihe District (Chinese: 茄子河区; pinyin: Qiézihé Qū) is a district of the city of Qitaihe, Heilongjiang province, China, occupying the eastern quarter of the prefectural administration.

== Administrative divisions ==
Qiezihe District is divided into 13 subdistricts, 2 towns and 2 townships.

13 subdistricts

- Dongfeng Shequgonggongfuwuzhan (东风社区公共服务站街道), Kangfu Shequgonggongfuwuzhan (康富社区公共服务站街道), Hudong Shequgonggongfuwuzhan (湖东社区公共服务站街道), * Kangle Shequgonggongfuwuzhan (康乐社区公共服务站街道), Yongtai Shequgonggongfuwuzhan (永泰社区公共服务站街道), Tongda Shequgonggongfuwuzhan (通达社区公共服务站街道), Huimin Shequgonggongfuwuzhan (惠民社区公共服务站街道), Anmin Shequgonggongfuwuzhan (安民社区公共服务站街道), Shengxin Shequgonggongfuwuzhan (盛馨社区公共服务站街道), Xinyuan Shequgonggongfuwuzhan (欣苑社区公共服务站街道), Dongsheng Shequgonggongfuwuzhan (东胜社区公共服务站街道), Fuqiang Shequgonggongfuwuzhan (富强社区公共服务站街道) and Longhu Shequgonggongfuwuzhan(龙湖社区公共服务站街道)

2 towns

- Qiezihe (茄子河镇) and Hongwei (宏伟镇)

2 townships

- Tieshan (铁山乡) and Zhongxinhe (中心河乡)
