= Taoer River =

Taoer
- Native name: 洮儿河 (Chinese)

Physical characteristics
- Mouth
  - location: Nen River
- Length: 595 km (370 mi)
- Basin size: 33,000 km^{2} (13,000 sq mi)

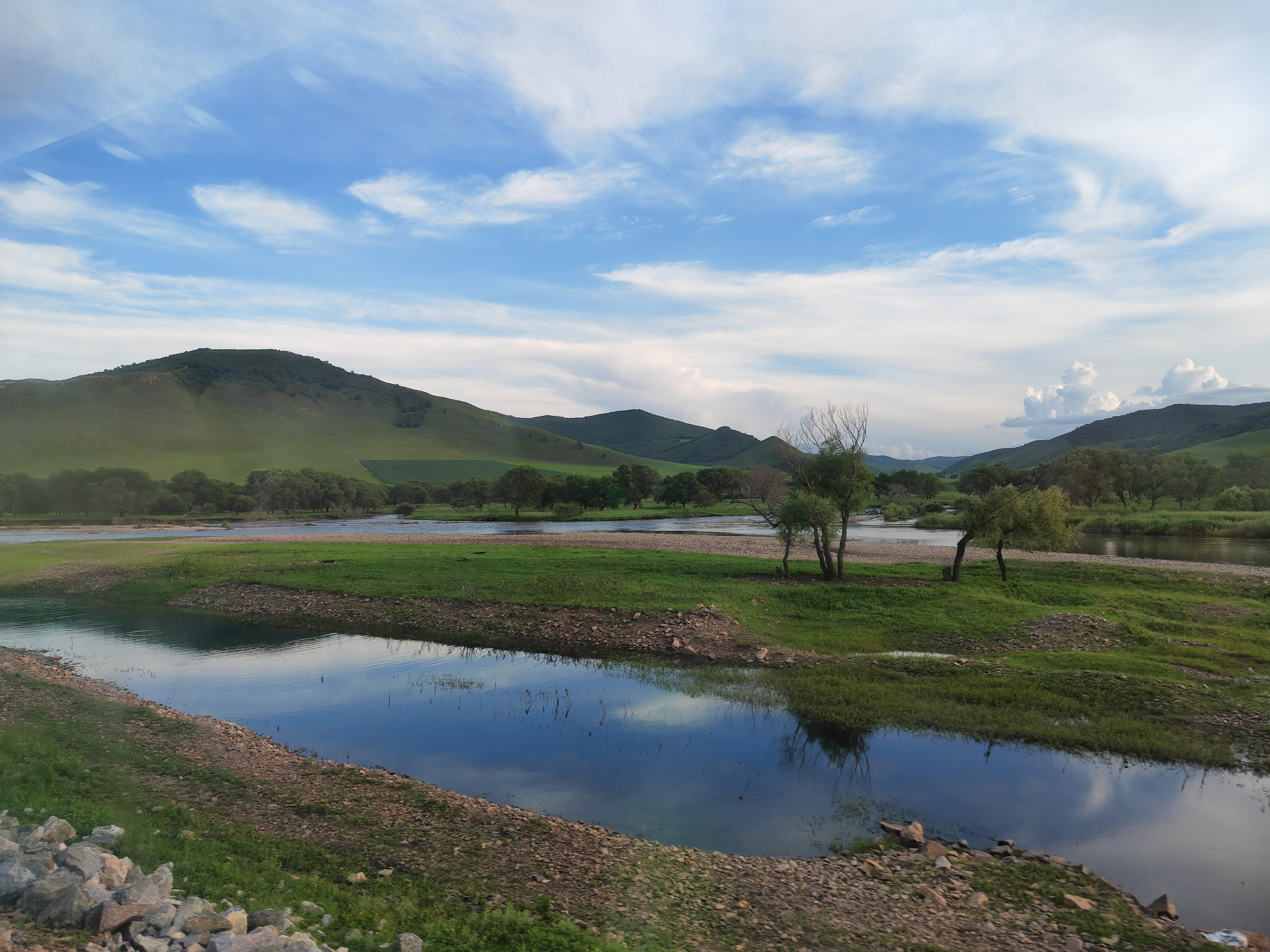

The Taoer (Chinese: 洮儿河) is a river in Northeast China. It is a right tributary of the Nen River. The source of the river is in the Greater Khingan, Inner Mongolia. It flows through Jilin where it joins the Nen River near Da'an.
