= Qitaihe =

Qitaihe 七台河市
- Prefecture-level city
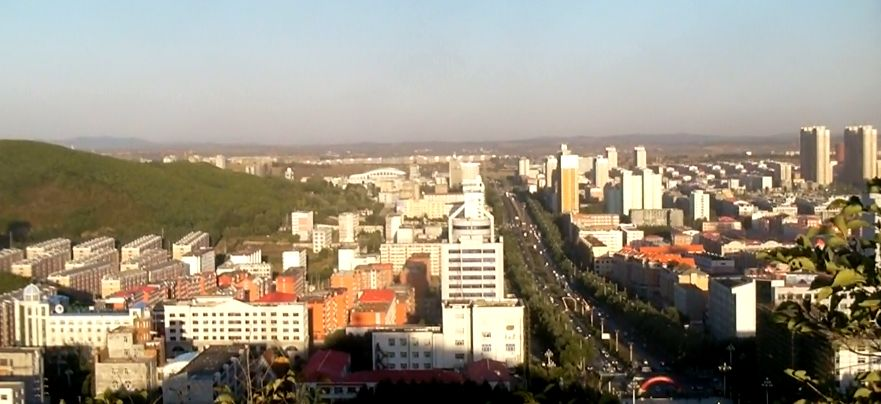
- View east along Xuefu Street

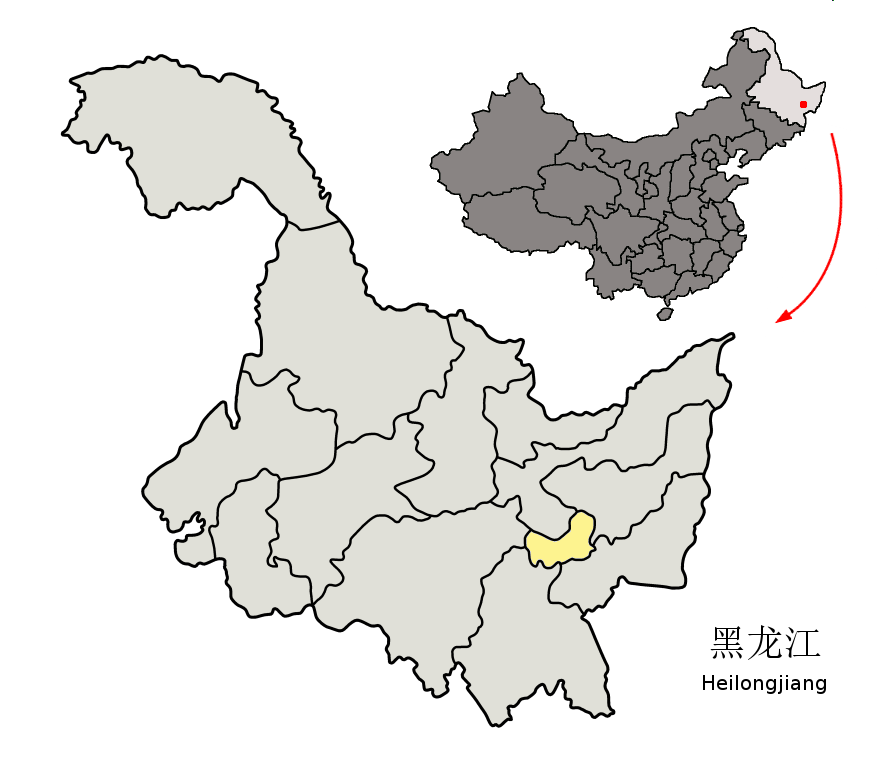
- Location of Qitaihe City (yellow) in Heilongjiang (light grey) and China

- Location of the city centre in Heilongjiang Location in China
- Coordinates (Qitaihe municipal government): 45°46′16″N 131°00′11″E
- Country: People's Republic of China
- Province: Heilongjiang
- County-level divisions: 4
- Established: 1 November 1983
- Municipal seat: Taoshan District

Government
  - Type: Prefecture-level city
  - CPC Qitaihe Secretary: Zhang Xianjun (张宪军)
  - Mayor: Zhang Tao (张涛); Acting

Area
  - Prefecture-level city: 6,221 km^{2} (2,402 sq mi)
- Elevation: 209 m (686 ft)

Population (2010)
  - Prefecture-level city: 920,419
  - Urban: 620,935

GDP
  - Prefecture-level city: CN¥ 21.3 billion US$ 3.4 billion
  - Per capita: CN¥ 24,829; US$ 3,986
- Time zone: UTC+8 (China Standard)
- Zipcode: 154600
- Area code: 0464
- ISO 3166 code: CN-HL-09
- Licence plates: 黑K
- Climate: Dwb
- Website: www.qth.gov.cn

Qitaihe
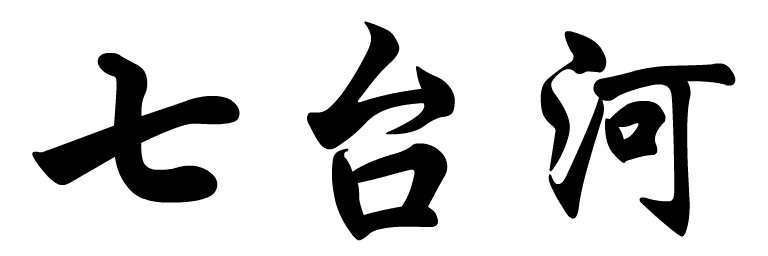
- "Qitaihe", as written in Chinese

Chinese name
- Chinese: 七台河
Transcriptions
Standard Mandarin
- Hanyu Pinyin: Qītáihé

Manchu name
- Manchu script: ᡴᡳᡨᠠᡳᡥᡝ
- Romanization: Kitaihe

Russian name
- Russian: Цитайхэ

Qitaihe (Chinese: 七台河; pinyin: Qītáihé) is a prefecture-level city in eastern Heilongjiang province, China. Covering an area 6,223 km^{2} (2,403 sq mi), it is geographically the smallest prefecture-level division of the province. Qitaihe also has the second smallest population of the cities in Heilongjiang. At the 2010 census, its total population was 920,419, while 620,935 live in the built up area made of 3 urban districts. In 2024, the population of the city will be 726,329, of which the urban population will be 444,058, accounting for 61.1%.

== Administrative divisions ==
Map
Name	Hanzi	Hanyu Pinyin	Population (2010 est.)	Area (km^{2})	Density (/km^{2})
Xinxing District	新兴区	Xīnxīng Qū	236,768	2,003	118
Taoshan District	桃山区	Táoshān Qū	230,293	74	3,112
Qiezihe District	茄子河区	Qiézihé Qū	153,874	1,569	98
Boli County	勃利县	Bólì Xiàn	299,484	2,575	116

== History ==
Qitaihe's history can be stretched back to 3,000 years ago during the Shang and Zhou Dynasties, when it was inhabited by the ancient Sushen group, the ancestors of the Manchu. In 1910, coal resources was found in Qitaihe. However, coal mining industry did not really start until The CPC Committee of Heilongjiang Province ordered Hegang Mining Bureau to take charge of the Extractive industries in Boli County in 1958. Qitaihe began its development. On January 26, 1961, Boli Mining Bureau was established. The CPC Central Committee and State Council approved to establish Qitaihe District (七台河特区) as a pilot of the combination of enterprise management and government administration. In 1970, Qitaihe District was changed into Qitaihe City (county-level), which is under the jurisdiction of Jiamusi. In 1983, Qitaihe was designated a Prefecture-level city, and Boli County was put into Qitaihe's jurisdiction.

== Geography and climate ==
=== Mineral resources ===
Qitaihe is rich in fresh water and minerals including coal, gold and graphite. There are 26 reservoirs in total. The water storage capacity of the city's Taoshan Reservoir is 264 million steres. Qitaihe has a total coal reserve of 5.3 billion tons, ranking third after Shuangyashan and Jixi in Heilongjiang Province.

=== Climate ===
Qitaihe has a monsoon-influenced humid continental climate (Köppen Dwb), with long, bitter, but dry winters, and humid and very warm summers.

Climate data for Qitaihe, elevation 225 m (738 ft), (1991–2020 normals)
Month	Jan	Feb	Mar	Apr	May	Jun	Jul	Aug	Sep	Oct	Nov	Dec	Year
Mean daily maximum °C (°F)	−11.7 (10.9)	−6.9 (19.6)	2.1 (35.8)	12.4 (54.3)	20.2 (68.4)	25.1 (77.2)	27.2 (81.0)	26.1 (79.0)	21.3 (70.3)	12.5 (54.5)	0.0 (32.0)	−10.4 (13.3)	9.8 (49.7)
Daily mean °C (°F)	−16.6 (2.1)	−12.4 (9.7)	−3.1 (26.4)	6.5 (43.7)	14.2 (57.6)	19.5 (67.1)	22.2 (72.0)	21.0 (69.8)	15.3 (59.5)	6.5 (43.7)	−4.7 (23.5)	−14.9 (5.2)	4.5 (40.0)
Mean daily minimum °C (°F)	−21.1 (−6.0)	−17.7 (0.1)	−8.3 (17.1)	0.6 (33.1)	8.3 (46.9)	14.2 (57.6)	17.8 (64.0)	16.7 (62.1)	9.9 (49.8)	1.1 (34.0)	−8.9 (16.0)	−18.9 (−2.0)	−0.5 (31.1)
Average precipitation mm (inches)	6.6 (0.26)	5.8 (0.23)	13.9 (0.55)	28.8 (1.13)	65.7 (2.59)	95.2 (3.75)	116.8 (4.60)	119.0 (4.69)	55.8 (2.20)	29.6 (1.17)	21.8 (0.86)	12.0 (0.47)	571 (22.5)
Average precipitation days (≥ 0.1 mm)	6.3	5.7	8.2	8.7	12.9	14.6	14.9	14.1	9.8	7.3	7.4	8.7	118.6
Average snowy days	9.6	9.0	11.2	5.2	0.2	0	0	0	0.1	2.9	9.9	13.4	61.5
Average relative humidity (%)	69	64	59	53	60	71	78	79	72	61	65	71	67
Mean monthly sunshine hours	138.8	165.3	204.4	199.7	207.7	219.0	216.5	209.8	208.3	173.3	131.0	118.9	2,192.7
Percentage possible sunshine	49	56	55	49	45	47	46	48	56	52	47	44	50
Source: China Meteorological Administration

== Economy ==
Coal mining is an important industry. Qitaihe is the only pilot city for coal recycling in Heilongjiang. The city's GDP topped RMB 23.35 billion in 2009, featuring a growth of 26% over the previous year. Qitaihe is home to Qitaihe Coal Mining Group and Qitaihe No.1 Power Generation Company.

== Transportation ==
The Tumen-Jiamusi Railway and the Boli-Qitaihe Railway connect the city with Mudanjiang, Jiamusi and other cities in Heilongjiang. Jiamusi Airport, Jixi Airport and Mudanjiang Airport, which offer regular flights to other domestic cities in China, are less than two hours away.
