= Forty-Fourth Army (Japan) =

Japanese Fortieth-Fourth Army
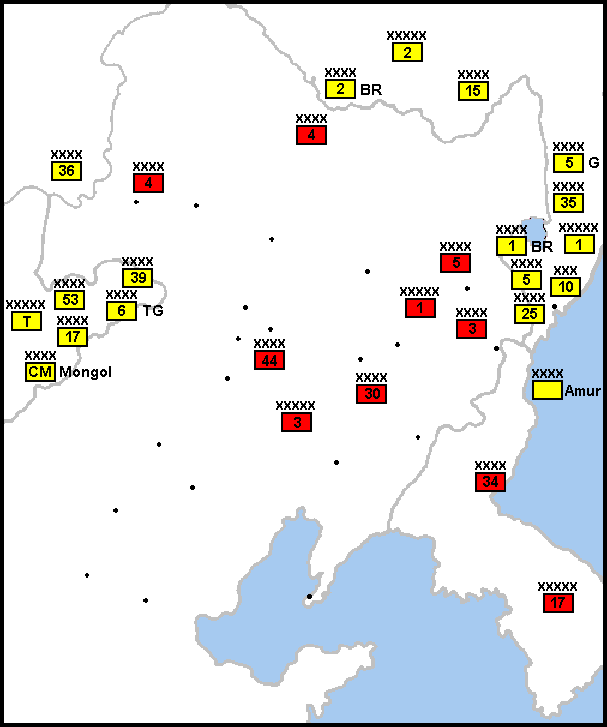
- Position of the 44th Army in 1945
- Active: January 12, 1945 – August 15, 1945
- Country: Empire of Japan
- Branch: Imperial Japanese Army
- Type: Infantry
- Role: Corps
- Garrison/HQ: Mukden, Manchukuo
- Nickname(s): Ensei (遠征, expeditionary)
- Engagements: Soviet invasion of Manchuria

The Japanese 44th Army (第44軍, Dai-yonjyū yon gun) was an army of the Imperial Japanese Army during the final stages of World War II.

== History ==
The Japanese 44th Army was initially raised in July 1941 as the Kwangtung Defense Army (関東防衛軍, Kanto boei gun), an auxiliary force of the Kwantung Army based in the Manchukuo capital of Xinjing for public security and training. As the war situation on the Pacific front grew increasingly desperate for Japan, the Imperial Japanese Army transferred more and more experienced divisions and their equipment out of Manchukuo to other fronts. By early 1945, the vaunted Kwantung Army was largely hollowed out, and indications of a buildup of Soviet Red Army forces on the borders on Mengjiang and Manchukuo were alarming. The Kwantung Defense Army was renamed the Japanese 44th Army on May 30, 1945 and assigned to the Japanese Third Area Army, based in southern Manchukuo. It saw combat against the Soviet Army in Soviet invasion of Manchuria, with combat operations continuing into September, even after the official surrender of Japan. It was officially disbanded at Mukden, with many of its surviving troops becoming Japanese prisoners of war in the Soviet Union.

== List of Commanders ==
=== Commanding Officer ===
	Name	From	To
1	General Tomoyuki Yamashita	17 July 1941	6 November 1941
2	Lieutenant General Tatsumi Kusaba	6 November 1941	21 December 1942
3	Lieutenant General Satoshi Kinoshita	21 December 1942	7 December 1943
4	Lieutenant General Shin Yoshida	7 December 1943	1 March 1945
5	Lieutenant General Yoshio Hongo	1 March 1945	September 1945

=== Chief of Staff ===
	Name	From	To
1	Lieutenant General Yasunori Yoshioka	17 July 1941	1 July 1942
2	Major General Senichi Tasaka	1 July 1942	16 May 1944
3	Major General Hiroshi Tamura	16 May 1944	2 October 1944
4	Major General Nobuyoshi Obata	2 October 1944	September 1945

== Sources ==
- Frank, Richard B (1999). Downfall: The End of the Imperial Japanese Empire. New York: Random House. ISBN 0-679-41424-X.
- Jowett, Bernard (1999). The Japanese Army 1931–45 (Volume 2, 1942–45). Osprey Publishing. ISBN 1-84176-354-3.
- Madej, Victor (1981). Japanese Armed Forces Order of Battle, 1937–1945. Game Publishing Company. ASIN: B000L4CYWW.
- Marston, Daniel (2005). The Pacific War Companion: From Pearl Harbor to Hiroshima. Osprey Publishing. ISBN 1-84176-882-0.
- Glantz, David (2003). The Soviet Strategic Offensive in Manchuria, 1945 (Cass Series on Soviet (Russian) Military Experience, 7). Routledge. ISBN 0-7146-5279-2.
