= Boli County =

Boli County 勃利县
- County
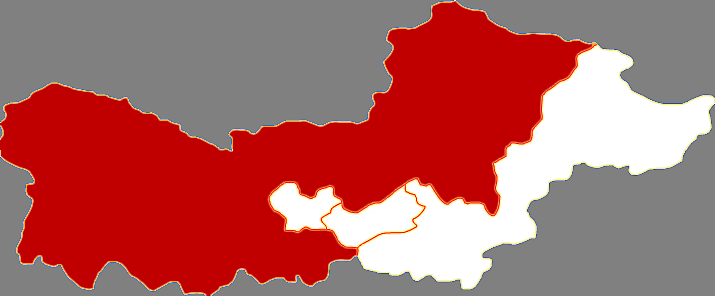
- Location in Qitaihe

- Location in Heilongjiang
- Coordinates: 45°50′N 130°52′E
- Country: People's Republic of China
- Province: Heilongjiang
- Prefecture-level city: Qitaihe
- Township-level divisions: 5 subdistricts 5 towns 5 townships
- County seat: Xinqi Subdistrict (新起街道)

Area
  - Total: 3,962 km^{2} (1,530 sq mi)
- Elevation: 223 m (732 ft)

Population (2004)
  - Total: 370,000
  - Density: 93/km^{2} (240/sq mi)
- Time zone: UTC+8 (China Standard)
- Postal code: 154500
- Area code: 0464

Boli (Chinese: 勃利; pinyin: Bólì) is a county of southeastern Heilongjiang province, People's Republic of China. It is the only county of the prefecture-level city of Qitaihe, the downtown area of which is about 32 kilometres (20 mi) to the east of the county seat.

== Administrative divisions ==
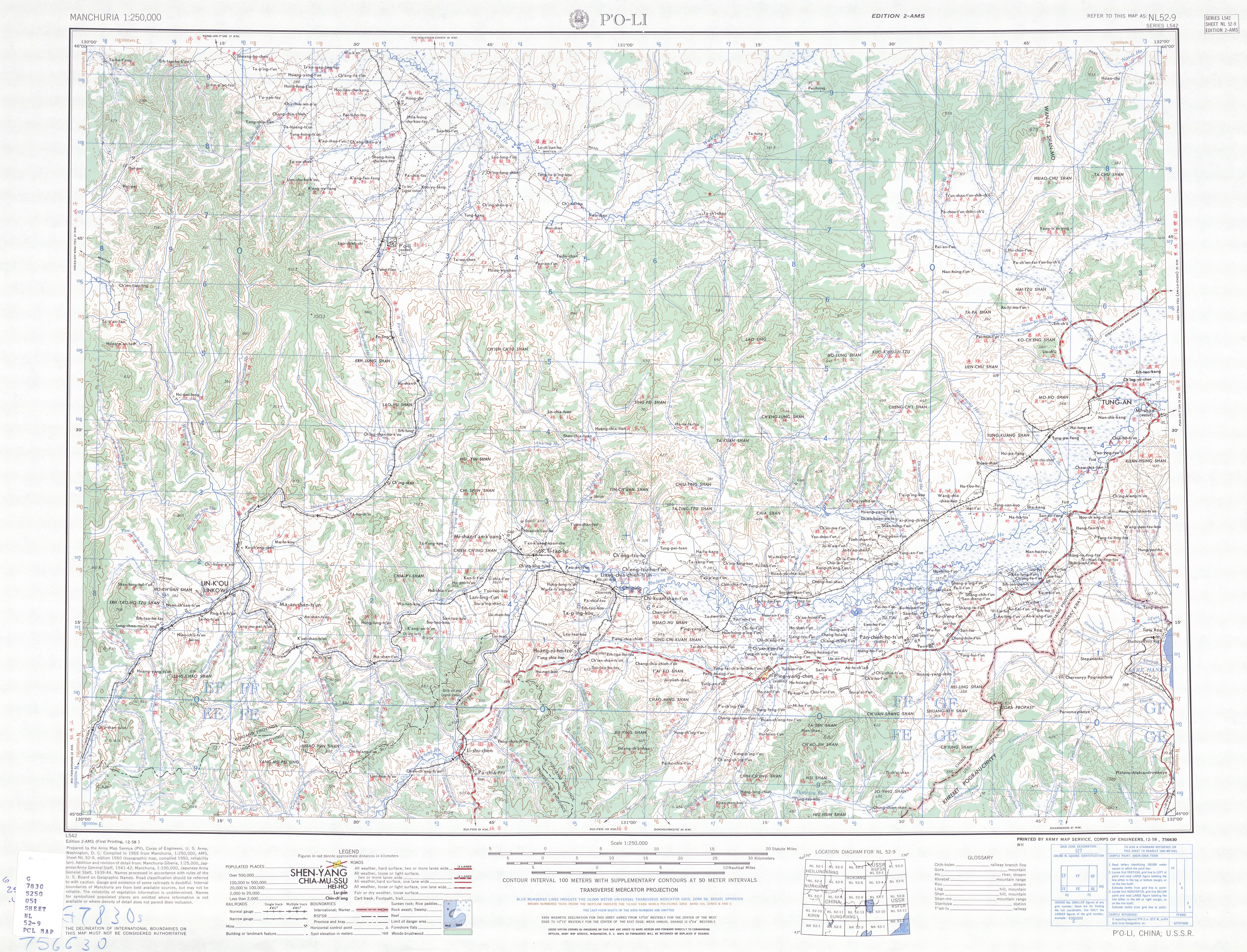
Boli (labelled as P'o-li [sic] 勃利) (1955)

There are five subdistricts, five towns and five townships in the county:

=== Subdistricts ===
- Xinqi Subdistrict (新起街道)
- Xinhua Subdistrict (新华街道)
- Yuanming Subdistrict (元明街道)
- Tiexi Subdistrict (铁西街道)
- Chengxi Subdistrict (城西街道)

=== Towns ===
- Boli (勃利镇)
- Woken (倭肯镇)
- Shuanghe (双河镇)
- Xiaowuzhan (小五站镇)
- Dasizhan (大四站镇)

=== Townships ===
- Qingshan Township (青山乡)
- Yongheng Township (永恒乡)
- Qiangken Township (抢垦乡)
- Xingshu Korean Ethnic Township (杏树朝鲜族乡)
- Jixing Korean and Manchu Ethnic Township (吉兴朝鲜族满族乡)

== Demographics ==
The population of the district was 371,933 in 1999.

== Climate ==
Climate data for Boli, elevation 234 m (768 ft), (1991–2020 normals, extremes 1981–2010)
Month	Jan	Feb	Mar	Apr	May	Jun	Jul	Aug	Sep	Oct	Nov	Dec	Year
Record high °C (°F)	5.8 (42.4)	8.4 (47.1)	19.5 (67.1)	30.4 (86.7)	33.7 (92.7)	37.1 (98.8)	38.6 (101.5)	35.9 (96.6)	31.7 (89.1)	29.5 (85.1)	17.7 (63.9)	7.2 (45.0)	38.6 (101.5)
Mean daily maximum °C (°F)	−11.0 (12.2)	−5.8 (21.6)	2.3 (36.1)	12.8 (55.0)	20.5 (68.9)	25.3 (77.5)	27.5 (81.5)	25.9 (78.6)	21.1 (70.0)	12.4 (54.3)	0.2 (32.4)	−9.3 (15.3)	10.2 (50.3)
Daily mean °C (°F)	−15.6 (3.9)	−10.8 (12.6)	−2.7 (27.1)	7.1 (44.8)	14.6 (58.3)	19.8 (67.6)	22.7 (72.9)	21.1 (70.0)	15.4 (59.7)	7.0 (44.6)	−4.3 (24.3)	−13.6 (7.5)	5.1 (41.1)
Mean daily minimum °C (°F)	−19.8 (−3.6)	−15.7 (3.7)	−7.8 (18.0)	1.5 (34.7)	8.8 (47.8)	14.5 (58.1)	18.1 (64.6)	16.6 (61.9)	10.0 (50.0)	1.8 (35.2)	−8.7 (16.3)	−17.6 (0.3)	0.1 (32.3)
Record low °C (°F)	−33.9 (−29.0)	−30.4 (−22.7)	−21.7 (−7.1)	−9.1 (15.6)	−2.1 (28.2)	4.9 (40.8)	9.6 (49.3)	7.3 (45.1)	−1.9 (28.6)	−12.8 (9.0)	−23.8 (−10.8)	−30.2 (−22.4)	−33.9 (−29.0)
Average precipitation mm (inches)	4.3 (0.17)	2.7 (0.11)	10.3 (0.41)	24.5 (0.96)	56.8 (2.24)	87.5 (3.44)	127.5 (5.02)	107.6 (4.24)	58.4 (2.30)	32.9 (1.30)	13.7 (0.54)	6.3 (0.25)	532.5 (20.98)
Average precipitation days (≥ 0.1 mm)	4.4	3.0	6.2	7.9	12.0	14.3	14.6	14.0	10.0	7.9	5.8	5.0	105.1
Average snowy days	8.2	6.5	10.0	4.8	0.1	0	0	0	0	3.0	9.1	10.4	52.1
Average relative humidity (%)	64	56	51	49	54	66	74	76	67	56	58	64	61
Mean monthly sunshine hours	150.2	175.6	209.8	201.8	219.0	227.8	224.2	218.6	223.8	187.6	156.6	137.3	2,332.3
Percentage possible sunshine	53	60	56	50	47	49	48	51	60	56	56	51	53
Source: China Meteorological Administration
