= Battle of South Guangxi order of battle =

The order of battle for the Battle of South Guangxi by country is as follows:

== Japan ==
21st Army (to Feb. 9th 1940) – Lt. Gen. Rikichi Andō 7]

22nd Army (10 Feb 1940 – 19 Nov 1940,- Army disbanded) – Lt. Gen Seiichi Kuno

- 5th Division – General Hitoshi Imamura (9 Nov 1938 – 9 Mar 1940), Lt. General Aketo Nakamura (9 Mar 1940 – 15 Oct 1940), Lt. General Takuro Matsui (15 Oct 1940 – 11 May 1942) 7]
  - 9th Infantry Brigade
    - 11th Infantry Regiment
    - 41st Infantry Regiment
  - 21st Infantry Brigade – Major Gen. Masao Nakamura
    - 21st Infantry Regiment
    - 42nd Infantry Regiment
  - 5th Mountain Artillery Regiment
  - 5th Cavalry Regiment
  - 5th Engineer Regiment
  - 5th Transport Regiment
- Formosa Mixed Brigade- Major Gen. Sadaichi Shioda [7]
  - 1st Formosa Infantry Regiment
  - 2nd Formosa Infantry Regiment
  - Formosa Artillery Regiment
  - Formosa Military Engineer Regiment

January 1940 reinforcements from Canton

- 18th Division – Lt. Gen. Seiichi Kuno [7]
  - 23rd Infantry Brigade
    - 55th Infantry Regiment
    - 56th Infantry Regiment
  - 35th Infantry Brigade
    - 114th Infantry Regiment
    - 124th Infantry Regiment
  - 18th Mountain Artillery Regiment
  - 22nd Cavalry Battalion
  - 12th Engineer Regiment
  - 12th Transport Regiment
- Guards Mixed Brigade – Major Gen. Takeshi Sakurada [7]
  - 1st Guards Infantry Regiment
  - 2nd Guards Infantry Regiment
  - Guards Cavalry Regiment
  - Guards Field Artillery Regiment (elements)
  - Guards Engineer Regiment (elements)
  - Guards Transport Regiment (elements)

Army Airforce:

- 21st Independent Aviation Corps, IJA – ?
  - Independent 82nd Dokuritsu Hiko Chutai [S. China] – ?
    - Light bomber squadron. (reconnaissance aircraft)
  - Independent 84th Dokuritsu Hiko Chutai [Canton] – Captain Magoji Hara
    - Nakajima Ki-27 (fighter aircraft)

Navy Airforce:

- 5th Fleet – Adm. Nobutake Kondō [7]
  - 2nd Air Sentai – ?
  - Akagi [southern China] (end/04/39 – middle/02/40)
    - Fighter Daitai – Mitsubishi A5M
    - Bomber Daitai – Aichi D1A2
    - Attack Daitai – Yokosuka B4Y1
  - 11th Destroyer Division--Hatsuyuki and Shirayuki
    - Kamikawa Maru – seaplane carrier
    - Chiyoda – seaplane carrier
- 3rd Combined Air Unit
  - 14th Kōkūtai, IJN [based in Nanning from late 12/39] – ?
    - Fighter Daitai – 13 Mitsubishi A5M

Notes:

- Initial landing and advance to Nanning by 5th Division and Taiwan Composite Brigade. Guards Mixed Brigade and the 18th Division were sent as reinforcements from Canton area in January 1940.

After 9 February 1940, the 18th Division was returned to Canton and the 21st Army was disbanded, the forces of the 21st Army came under the control of the Southern China Area Army (Canton) under General Rikichi Andō (10 Feb 1940 – 5 Oct 1940) and General Jun Ushiroku (5 Oct 1940 – 26 Jun 1941). The forces remaining in Guangxi, now subordinate to South China Front Army, became the Japanese Twenty-Second Army under Lt. Gen Seiichi Kuno (10 Feb 1940 – 19 Nov 1940), until the Army was disbanded at the end of the campaign. On June 3, 1940, the Guards Mixed Brigade became the 1st Guards Brigade of the 1st Guards Division. The 2nd Imperial Guards Infantry Regiment under Col. Kunio Osonoe from 1st Guards Brigade was assigned to the Indochina Expeditionary Army in September, 1940. In October 1940, the remainder of 1st Guards Brigade (1st Guard Regiment and support units) joined other Japanese units occupying French Indochina.

== China ==
Generalissimo's HQ in Guilin – Bai Chongxi

- 16th Group Army – Wei Yun-sun *
  - 31st Army – Wei Yun-sun
    - 131st Division
    - 135th Division
    - 188th Division
  - 46th Army – Ho Hsuan
    - 170th Division
    - 175th Division
    - New 19th Division
- 26th Group Army – Cai Tingkai *
  - 1st Sep. Inf. Regts.
  - 2nd Sep. Inf. Regts.
  - 3rd Sep. Inf. Regts.
  - 4th Sep. Inf. Regts.
- 35th Group Army – Teng Lung-kuang
  - 64th Army – Chen Kung-hsia
    - 155th Division
    - 156th Division
- 37th Group Army – Ye Zhao
  - 66th Army – Ye Zhao
    - 159th Division
    - 160th Division
- 38th Group Army – Xu Tingyao
  - 2nd Army – Li Yannian
    - 9th Division
    - 76th Division
  - 5th Army – Du Yuming
    - 200th Division (Mechanized Division) – Du Yuming
      - 598th Infantry regiment (with Soviet trucks)
      - 599th Infantry regiment (with Soviet trucks)
      - 600th Infantry regiment (with Soviet trucks)
    - Armored vehicle regiment (50 BA type armored cars)
    - Armored regiment (70 T-26, 4 BT-5, 18-20 CV-33's)
    - Motorized Artillery regiment (122mm howitzers, 75mm field guns and 45mm AT guns)
    - New 22nd Division
    - 1st Honor Division
  - 9th Army – Kan Li-chu
    - 49th Division
    - 93rd Division
    - 2nd Reserve Division
  - 99th Army – Fu Chung-fang
    - 92nd Division
    - 99th Division
    - 118th Division
  - 36th Army – Yao Chuen
    - 5th Division
    - 96th Division
- 43rd Division
- New 3rd Division
- Kwangsi Pacification HQ
- Artillery Detachment

Air Forces: **

- C A F 2nd Route Force – Colonel Chang Ting-Meng
  - 100 planes
  - 115 planes
  - 3rd Pursuit Group – Huang Panyang
    - 7th Pursuit Squadron – Lu Tian-Long
      - Polikarpov I-15
    - 8th Pursuit Squadron – ?
      - Polikarpov I-15
    - 27th Pursuit Squadron -
      - Gloster Gladiator Mk. I, Polikarpov I-
    - 29th Pursuit Squadron -
      - Gloster Gladiator Mk. I, Polikarpov I-
    - 32nd Pursuit Squadron – Wei Yi-Ging †
      - Gloster Gladiator Mk. I, Polikarpov I-15bis
  - 4th Pursuit Group – Liu Chi-Han
    - 21st Pursuit Squadron – Lo Ying-Teh
      - Polikarpov I-15bis -
    - 22nd Pursuit Squadron – Zheng Shaoyu
      - Polikarpov I-15bis -
    - 23rd Pursuit Squadron – ?
      - Polikarpov I-15bis -
    - 24th Pursuit Squadron – Su Xian-Ren
      - Polikarpov I-16
  - 5th Pursuit Group ?
    - 17th Pursuit Squadron – Captain Cen Zeliu
      - Polikarpov I-15bis, Dewoitine D.510
    - 26th Pursuit Squadron – ?
      - Polikarpov I-16
    - 28th Pursuit Squadron – Major Louie Yim-Qun (reassigned to the 3rd PG on 1 October 1938 - Maj. Chen Ruidian)
      - Gloster Gladiator Mk. I, Polikarpov I-15bis
    - 29th Pursuit Squadron – Captain Ma Kwok-Lim
      - Polikarpov I-15bis
  - 6th Bomber Group – ?
    - 19th Bomber Squadron – ?
      - Tupolev SB-2
  - 18th Pursuit Squadron – Major Yang Yibai
    - Curtiss Hawk III, Curtiss Hawk 75
  - Soviet Suprun Group – K. K. Kokkinaki
    - Polikarpov I-16

Notes:

1. 16th Army Group and 26th Army Group were original defenders of Guangxi. Other units were reinforcements which gradually arrived from Hunan, Guangdong, and Sichuan.

2. On 18 December the Chinese launched a successful counter-offensive against the Japanese in the Guangxi Province. To support the Chinese Guangxi-offensive and direct the air-units the more experienced 1st ARC (Colonel Chang Ting-Meng) temporarily replaced the 2nd ARC (Colonel Xing Zhanfei) at Liuzhou, with the 2nd ARC moving to rear positions at Guilin.

Taking part in the offensive were 115 aircraft of the 3rd, 4th and 5th PGs, 6th BG, 18th PS and one of the Soviet groups.
