= Guards Division (disambiguation) =

Guards Division may refer to one of the following.

- Imperial Guard (Japan)
  - 1st Guards Division (Imperial Japanese Army)
  - 2nd Guards Division (Imperial Japanese Army)
  - 3rd Guards Division (Imperial Japanese Army)
- Germany, during World War I:
  - Guards Cavalry Division (German Empire)
  - 1st Guards Infantry Division (German Empire)
  - 2nd Guards Infantry Division (German Empire)
  - 3rd Guards Infantry Division (German Empire)
  - 4th Guards Infantry Division (German Empire)
  - 5th Guards Infantry Division (German Empire)
  - 1st Guards Reserve Division (German Empire)
  - 2nd Guards Reserve Division (German Empire)
  - Guard Ersatz Division (German Empire)
- Russia:
  - Russian Imperial Guard
    - 1st Guard Cavalry division (Russian Empire)
    - 2nd Guard Cavalry division (Russian Empire)
    - 1st Guards Infantry Division (Russian Empire)
    - 3rd Guard Infantry Division (Russian Empire)
  - Guards unit, of the USSR and post-Soviet states
- United Kingdom:
  - Guards Division of the present-day British Army administrative formation
  - Guards Division (United Kingdom) of the British Army in World War I and briefly at the end of World War II
  - Guards Armoured Division of the British Army in World War II
