= Takeshi Sakurada =

Japanese general (1891–1943)

- 桜田 武
- Born: December 8, 1891; Miyagi, Japan
- Died: September 10, 1943 (aged 51); East China Sea
- Military career
- Allegiance: Empire of Japan
- Branch: Imperial Japanese Army
- Service years: 1913–1945
- Rank: Lieutenant General
- Commands: IJA 5th Division, Imperial Guard, IJA 22nd Army, Army Naval Transport Command
- Conflicts: Second Sino-Japanese War; World War II; Pacific War †

Takeshi Sakurada (桜田 武, Sakurada Takeshi; 8 December 1891 – 10 September 1943) was a lieutenant general in the Imperial Japanese Army during World War II.

== Biography ==
A native of Miyagi Prefecture in northern Japan, Sakurada attended military preparatory schools in Sendai and Tokyo, and graduated from the 25th class of the Imperial Japanese Army Academy in 1913. After graduation, he served as a junior officer with the IJA 29th Infantry Regiment. He graduated from the 35th class of the Army Staff College in November 1921. He subsequently served on the staff of the IJA 10th Division. From August 1925 to August 1928 he served as a staff officer in the Kwantung Army, and later as battalion commander of the IJA 34th Infantry Brigade and instructor at the Army Artillery School.

Before the start of the Second Sino-Japanese War, Sakurada assigned to the staff of the IJA 5th Division in March 1935. He participated in the Battle of Xuzhou and other campaigns in southern China, becoming chief-of-staff of the division from November 1937. In August 1939, he was promoted to major general and transferred to take command of the Guards 1st Brigade. He subsequently commanded the Guards Mixed Brigade from November 1939.

In September 1940, Sakurada was assigned to command the Infantry Group of the IJA 22nd Army for the Invasion of French Indochina. When the unit was disbanded in February 1941, he resumed his post as commander of the Guards Mixed Brigade to July 1941. He then was made commandant if the Morioka Army Reserve Officer School from July 1941, and the Maebashi Army Reserve Officer School from August 1941. However, with the Pacific War, he did not enter the reserves himself, but was promoted to lieutenant general in December 1942 and was assigned command of the Army Naval Transport Headquarters based on Cebu in the Japanese-occupied Philippines. He was killed in action on 10 September 1943, when a transport ship carrying him through the East China Sea was sunk by Allied forces.
