= 2nd Guards Brigade =

2nd Guards Brigade may refer to:

== German ==
- 2nd Guards Cavalry Brigade (German Empire)
- 2nd Guards Artillery Brigade (German Empire)
- 2nd Guards Infantry Brigade (German Empire)

== Others ==
- 2nd Guards Brigade (Croatia)
- 2nd Guards Mixed Brigade (Japan)
- 2nd Guards Brigade (United Kingdom)
