= Asada Nobuoki =

Baron Asada Nobuoki
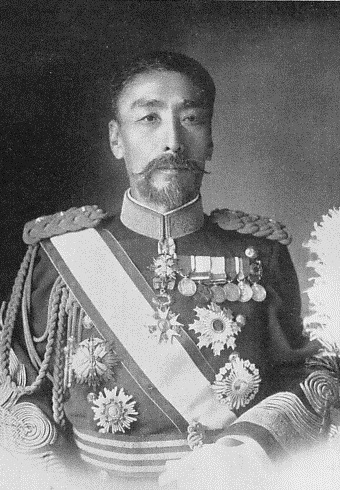
- Native name: 浅田 信興
- Born: November 6, 1851; Kawagoe Domain, Japan
- Died: April 27, 1927 (aged 75) Tokyo, Japan
- Allegiance: Empire of Japan
- Branch: Imperial Japanese Army
- Service years: 1872–1921
- Rank: General
- Conflicts: Satsuma Rebellion; First Sino-Japanese War; Russo-Japanese War
- Awards: Order of the Rising Sun

Baron Asada Nobuoki (浅田 信興; November 6, 1851 – April 27, 1927) was a general in the Imperial Japanese Army.

== Biography ==
Asada was born as the third son of Sakaguchi Akitada, a samurai retainer of the Kawagoe Domain in Musashi Province, and was adopted by Asada Junshin, a senior retainer of the same clan as his heir. He studied artillery under Egawa Hidetatsu, and after the Meiji Restoration, entered the fledgling Imperial Japanese Army Academy. In March 1872, he was commissioned as a lieutenant with the IJA 5th Infantry Battalion. After transferring to the IJA 4th Infantry Brigade in 1877, he was sent to the front lines during the Satsuma Rebellion. In March 1878, he was assigned as an instructor at the Army Academy, following which he joined the staff of the Kumamoto garrison. In March 1884, he was promoted to the rank of major and given command of the IJA 2nd Infantry Regiment. In May 1885, he was assigned to the Imperial Japanese Army General Staff.

From June to September 1885 he was sent to Qing dynasty China as a military attaché. In 1889, he was given command of the IJA 21st Infantry Regiment. He was promoted to lieutenant colonel in June 1891 and reassigned to the staff of the IJA 3rd Division. In November 1894, he was promoted to colonel.

With the First Sino-Japanese War, Asada was assigned as chief of staff of the new IJA 7th Division, which did not see any combat, but was a training division assigned primarily to the defense of Tokyo. Asada was promoted to major general on October 20, 1898, and given command of the IJA 5th Infantry Brigade. During the Russo-Japanese War of 1904–1905, Asada was promoted to lieutenant general and commander of the Imperial Guards Brigade, which distinguished itself at the Battle of Shaho.

After the war, he was assigned the IJA 12th Division at Kurume, Fukuoka in July 1906. He was awarded the Grand Cordon of the Order of the Rising Sun in 1906. He was elevated to the title of baron (danshaku) in the kazoku peerage system in September 1907 for his work during the Russo-Japanese War.

In August 1910, he became commander of the IJA 4th Division at Osaka. In September 1911, he was appointed Inspector-General of Military Training, one of the top positions in the Japanese Army. In 1912, he was promoted to full general.

After serving as a military councilor, he retired from active service in 1921. From 1918 to 1923, Asada was the 7th head of the Dai Nippon Butoku Kai. He died in 1927 at age 77.
