= 1st Guards Division =

1st Guards Division may refer to:

- 1st Guards Airborne Division, Soviet Union
- 1st Guards Cavalry Division, Russian Empire
- 1st Guards Division (Imperial Japanese Army)
- 1st Guards Infantry Division (German Empire)
- 1st Guards Infantry Division (Russian Empire)

== See also ==
- 1st Division (disambiguation)
