= 2nd Guards Mixed Brigade =

2nd Guards Mixed Brigade (Japan)
- Active: 1939–1941
- Country: Empire of Japan
- Allegiance: Emperor of Japan
- Branch: Imperial Japanese Army
- Type: Mixed Brigade
- Part of: Imperial Guards Division
- Garrison/HQ: Hainan
- Engagements: World War II

The 2nd Guards Mixed Brigade was a military unit of the Imperial Japanese Army.

== History ==
After the Imperial Guards Division split in 1939, the 3rd and 4th Guards Infantry Regiments, with the remaining support and service units became the 2nd Guards Mixed Brigade. In 1940 it went to China, stopping in Shanghai before receiving a posting to Hainan Island. In June 1941, the 5th Guards Infantry Regiment and Guards Reconnaissance Regiment joined it there and the brigade became the Imperial Guard Division again.

== See also ==
- List of IJA Mixed Brigades
