= 4th Mixed Brigade =

The 4th Mixed Brigade was a military unit of the Imperial Japanese Army.

== History ==
This Mixed Brigade was a detachment from the 8th Division, in November 1931 to Heilongjiang province to reinforce the Invasion of Manchuria. It participated in the capture of Harbin in February 1932. It rejoined its parent unit when the 8th Division came to Manchuria later that year.

== See also ==
- List of Japanese Mixed Brigades
