= 2nd Guards Division =

2nd Guards Division can refer to:

- 2nd Guards Infantry Division (German Empire)
- 2nd Guards Division (Imperial Japanese Army)
- 2nd Guards Cavalry Division, Russian Empire
- 2nd Guards Motor Rifle Division
- 2nd Guards Infantry Division (Russian Empire)
- 2nd Guards Tank Division, Soviet Union

== See also ==
- 2nd Division (disambiguation)
