= 1st Guards Brigade =

1st Guards Brigade may refer to:

- 1st Guards Brigade (Croatia)
- 1st Guards Brigade (Army of Republika Srpska)
- 1st Guards Infantry Brigade (Imperial Japanese Army)
- 1st Guards Armoured Brigade (Ukraine)
- 1st (Guards) Brigade designation for the British 1st Infantry Brigade at the outbreak of World War I and World War II
- 1st Guards Brigade (United Kingdom)

== See also ==
- 1st Brigade (disambiguation)
