= 1st Guards Infantry Brigade (Imperial Japanese Army) =

- Active: 1867–1939
- Disbanded: 1939
- Country: Empire of Japan
- Allegiance: Emperor of Japan
- Branch: Imperial Guard (Japan)
- Type: Infantry
- Garrison/HQ: Tokyo

The 1st Guards Infantry Brigade was a military unit of the Imperial Guard, and later the Imperial Guards Division. In 1939 it was succeeded by the Guards Mixed Brigade.

== Military Action ==
=== Russo-Japanese war ===
The 1st Guards Brigade was a part of the 1st Guards Division during the Russo-Japanese war. The brigade was commanded by Asada Nobuoki.
