= 24th Mixed Brigade =

The 24th Mixed Brigade was a military unit of the Imperial Japanese Army.

== History ==
This Mixed Brigade was sent by the 12th Division from Japan to the Battle of Shanghai in 1932.

== Organization ==
- 24th Mixed Brigade – ?, 3,000 troops
  - 2nd Battalion / 14th Infantry Regiment
  - 1st Battalion / 24th Infantry Regiment
  - 1st Battalion / 46th Infantry Regiment
  - 1st Battalion / 48th Infantry Regiment
  - 1 Squadron Cavalry
  - 2nd Battalion / 3rd Independent Mountain Gun Regiment (two Batteries)
  - 2nd Company / 18th Engineer Battalion

== See also ==
- Mixed Brigades (Imperial Japanese Army)
- List of Japanese Mixed Brigades
