= 33rd Mixed Brigade =

The Japanese 33rd Mixed Brigade was a military unit of the Imperial Japanese Army.

== History ==
This Mixed Brigade was a detachment of the IJA 10th Division commanded by Major Gen. Nakamura in the Battle of Rehe in the battle along the Great Wall in 1933.

== See also ==
- List of Japanese Mixed Brigades
