= List of IJA Mixed Brigades =

The Japanese Imperial Army had divisional mixed brigades, which were the detachment of a brigade from an infantry division with various divisional support units or units attached from its corps or army. This provided a combined arms force of infantry, artillery, cavalry and other support units.

== List of Japanese Imperial Army Mixed Brigades ==
- Guards Mixed Brigade
- 2nd Guards Mixed Brigade (Japan)
- 4th Mixed Brigade (Imperial Japanese Army) – Manchuria 1931–1932
- 8th Mixed Brigade (Imperial Japanese Army) – Manchuria 1931–1932
- 14th Mixed Brigade (Imperial Japanese Army) – Manchuria 1931–1932
- 15th Mixed Brigade (Imperial Japanese Army)
  - Katayama Detachment – Manchukuo 1939
- 24th Mixed Brigade (Imperial Japanese Army) – Shanghai 1932
- 33rd Mixed Brigade (Imperial Japanese Army) – China 1933
- 39th Mixed Brigade (Imperial Japanese Army) – Manchuria 1931
- Karafuto Mixed Brigade (Imperial Japanese Army) – Sakhalin 1939 – February 1945 (reformed to 88th division)

== See also ==
- List of Japanese Infantry divisions
- List of IJA Independent Mixed Brigades
