= 25th Infantry Regiment (Imperial Japanese Army) =

- Active: May 1888- September 1945
- Country: Empire of Japan
- Branch: Imperial Japanese Army
- Type: Infantry
- Garrison/HQ: Sapporo, Hokkaido
- Engagements: Russo-Japanese War; Siberian Intervention; Nomonhan Incident; Guadalcanal Campaign

The IJA Twenty Fifth Infantry Regiment (第25連隊) was an infantry regiment in the Imperial Japanese Army. It was part of the Imperial 7th Division, the first to be organised under the reorganisation and modernisation program of the Japanese army in the late 19th century. Together with the 26th Infantry Regiment, it formed the 13th Infantry Brigade.

== History ==
The regiment spent its first 50 years garrisoning Sapporo, Hokkaido, although the rest of the division was stationed in Asasikawa. However, it also participated in early conflicts in mainland Asia, such as the Russo-Japanese War and the Siberian Intervention. In 1938 it and the rest of the 7th division were assigned to the Kwantung army in Manchuria, and participated in the Nomonhan Incident. It suffered a 91% casualty rate relieving the inexperienced 23rd Infantry Division from the Red Army, which caused it to spend the next three years in Hokkaido again. The regiment then participated in the Guadalcanal Campaign and was near annihilated. It was disbanded on September 2, 1945 under the terms of the Japanese Instrument of Surrender.

== See also ==
- Organization of the Imperial Japanese Army
- Imperial Japanese Army Uniforms
