= Seiichi Kuno =

Japanese general (1887–1962)

- 久納 誠一
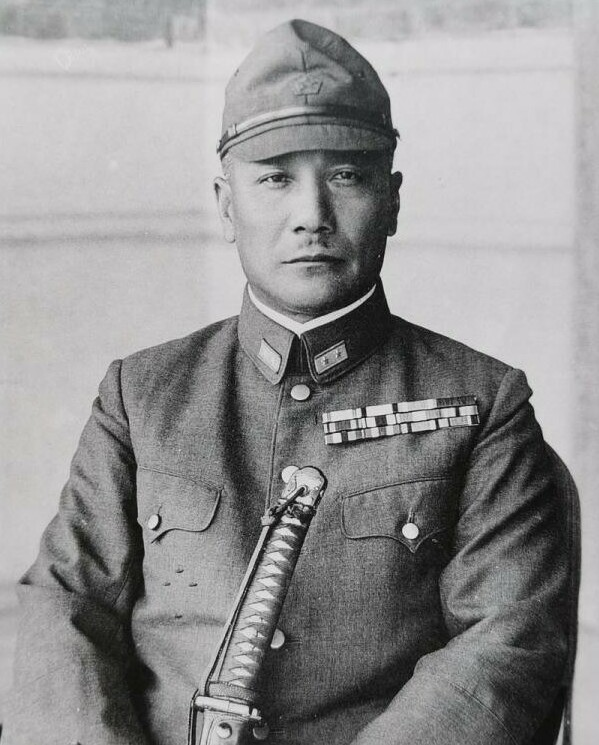
- Born: March 4, 1887; Tokyo, Japan
- Died: March 13, 1962 (aged 75)
- Military career
- Allegiance: Empire of Japan
- Branch: Imperial Japanese Army
- Service years: 1905-1945
- Rank: Lieutenant General
- Commands: IJA 18th Division, IJA 22nd Army
- Conflicts: Second Sino-Japanese War

Seiichi Kuno (久納 誠一, Kunō Seiichi; 4 March 1887 – 13 March 1962) was a lieutenant general in the Imperial Japanese Army in the Second Sino-Japanese War.

== Biography ==
Kuno was a native of Tokyo. He graduated from the 18th class of the Imperial Japanese Army Academy in 1905, and was commissioned as a second lieutenant in the cavalry. He graduated with honors from the 26th class of the Army Staff College in 1914. After serving briefly on the Imperial Japanese Army General Staff, Kuno was assigned as aide-de-camp to Prince Fushimi Sadanaru from 1915-1917. From 1917-1919, he was sent as a military observer to France and with the French Army in Romania during World War I.

After his return to Japan, Kuno served in a number of administrative and staff positions, including that of Secretary to Yamanashi Hanzō, the Governor-General of Korea in 1927.

From 1927-1929, Kuno commanded the IJA 28th Cavalry Regiment. He was instructor at the Army War College from 1929–1932, and at the Cavalry School from 1932-1933. In 1933, he became Chief of Staff of the IJA 8th Division. In 1934, he was awarded the Order of the Golden Kite, 4th class and the Order of the Rising Sun, 3rd class.

Kuno was briefly Commandant of the Cavalry School in 1935, before being appointed commander of the IJA 4th Cavalry Brigade. He was promoted to major general in 1936.

Kuno became Chief of Staff of the Chosen Army in Korea from 1936–1938, and was thus involved in the dispatch of troops without orders from Tokyo in the Manchurian Incident in the early stages of the Second Sino-Japanese War.

Promoted to lieutenant general, from 1938–1940, Kuno commanded the IJA 18th Division, which saw considerable combat during the 1939-40 Winter Offensive. He subsequently commanded the Japanese 22nd Army during the Battle of South Guangxi in 1940. Recalled to Japan in 1940 after the unauthorized invasion of French Indochina, he was forced into retirement from active military service in 1941.

== Bibliography ==
- Ammenthorp, Steen. "Kuno Seiichi, Lieutenant-General". The Generals of World War II.
- Dorn, Frank (1974). The Sino-Japanese War, 1937-41: From Marco Polo Bridge to Pearl Harbor. MacMillan. ISBN 0-02-532200-1.
- Hsu, Long-hsuen; Chang Ming-kai (1971). History of The Sino-Japanese War (1937-1945). Taipei, Taiwan: Chung Wu Publishing. ISBN 0-02-532200-1.
