= Tadamichi Kuribayashi =

Imperial Japanese Army general (1891–1945)

- 栗林 忠道
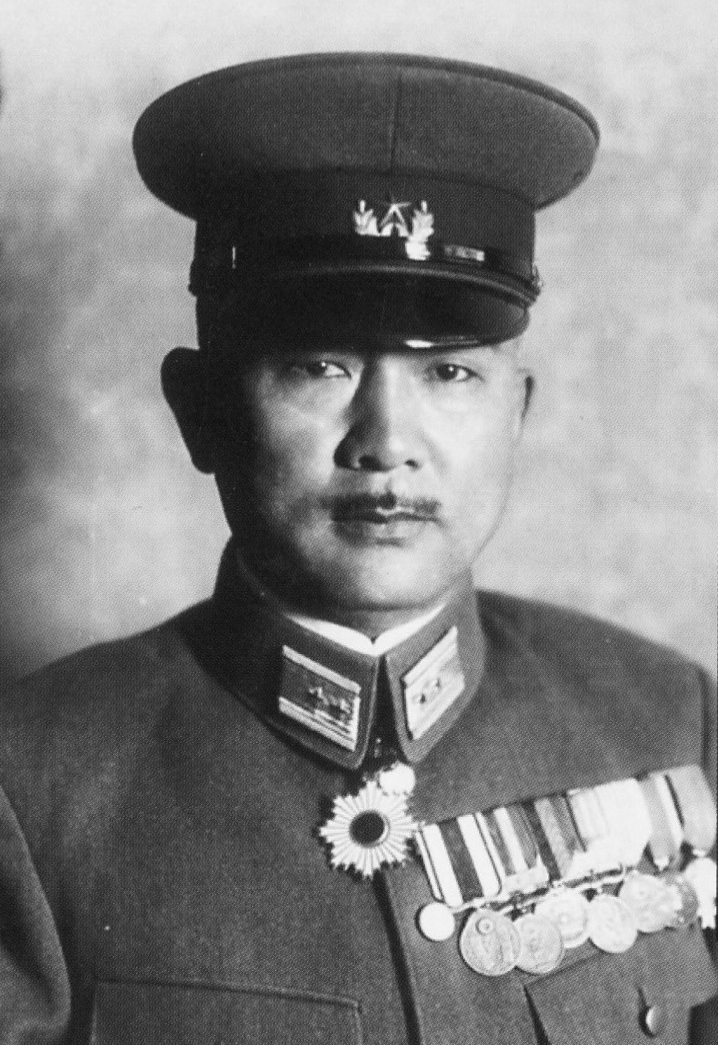
- Kuribayashi in 1943
- Born: 7 July 1891; Nagano, Japan
- Died: c. 26 March 1945 (aged 53); Iwo Jima, Japan
- Education: Imperial Japanese Army Academy; Army War College; Harvard University
- Military career
- Allegiance: Empire of Japan
- Branch: Imperial Japanese Army
- Service years: 1911–1945
- Rank: General
- Units: 1st Cavalry Brigade; 2nd Cavalry Brigade; 2nd Guards Division; 109th Infantry Division
- Conflicts: World War II; Pacific War; Battle of Hong Kong; Battle of Iwo Jima (PKIA)
- Awards: Grand Cordon of the Order of the Rising Sun (1967; posthumous); Grand Cordon of the Order of the Sacred Treasure; Order of the Rising Sun with Gold and Silver Star (2nd class); Order of the Rising Sun, Gold Rays with Neck Ribbon (3rd class)

Tadamichi Kuribayashi (栗林 忠道, Kuribayashi Tadamichi; 7 July 1891 – c. 26 March 1945) was a general in the Imperial Japanese Army, diplomat, and commanding officer of the Imperial Japanese Army General Staff. He is best known for having been the commander of the Japanese garrison at the battle of Iwo Jima.

Even before the battle, General Kuribayashi insisted upon sharing the hardships of his men. He also refused to permit banzai charges, which he regarded as an unnecessary waste of his men's lives. The United States Marine Corps had expected to capture Iwo Jima in five days, but Kuribayashi and his men held out for 36 days. It is believed that Kuribayashi was killed in action while leading his soldiers in a night-attack on American troops, but his body was never identified by the United States military. U.S. Marine Corps General Holland Smith said of Kuribayashi that "Of all our adversaries in the Pacific, Kuribayashi was the most redoubtable."

== Early life ==
Kuribayashi was born in Matsushiro, Nagano, to an established samurai family dating to the Sengoku period. The Kuribayashi family began as land-owning nobles under the Sanada clan, then were members of the Matsushiro Domain during the Edo period. They launched business ventures in silk and banking in the Meiji period but both failed owing to their aristocratic status. By Kuribayashi's birth in 1891, his family were working to rebuild their estate after fires destroyed their property in 1868 and 1881. Kuribayashi's father, Tsurujiro, held jobs in lumber and civil engineering while his mother, Moto, maintained the family farm.

At Matsushiro Higher Elementary School and then Nagano Middle School (now Nagano High School), Kuribayashi excelled academically with a specialty in the English language. He initially sought to become a foreign correspondent; while stationed on Iwo Jima during World War II, he told a reporter that he had explored the possibility of becoming a journalist. Vice Admiral Shigeji Kaneko, a classmate of Kuribayashi at Nagoya, recalled that "he once organized a strike against the school authorities. He just escaped expulsion by a hair. In those days, he was already good in poetry-writing, composition and speech-making. He was a young literary enthusiast."

As a student, Kuribayashi passed examinations for admission to Tōa Dōbun Shoin, a prestigious Japanese college in Shanghai, and the Imperial Japanese Army Academy, ultimately choosing to enroll in the latter. He matriculated at the military academy as a member of its 26th class. After being commissioned as a first lieutenant in cavalry, he then attended the Army War College in Minato, Tokyo, for training in advanced command, graduating second in his class in 1923. As a result of their high academic rank, accomplished students of the college were presented with a guntō by the emperor and earned a unique privilege to study abroad. Kuribayashi chose to study alone in the United States as a military attaché with the 1st Cavalry Division; this was in contrast to most students, who opted for places like Germany or France. He left Japan in March 1928 as a 36-year-old cavalry captain and lodged with a regular family in Buffalo, New York.

Kuribayashi's experience in the United States would distinguish him from other generals in the Imperial Japanese Army. He enrolled in Harvard University and became an involved student there, taking and completing courses in English, American history, and American politics. He also audited courses at the University of Michigan in similar subjects. Throughout his time in the country, Kuribayashi would travel extensively, living in Washington, D.C.; Boston, Massachusetts; Fort Bliss, Texas; and Fort Riley, Kansas, while also making visits to New York City, San Francisco, and Los Angeles. He purchased a Chevrolet automobile, which he used to journey across the country, and was taught by an American officer how to drive. During his time training with the U.S. army at Fort Riley, Kuribayashi befriended Brigadier General George Van Horn Moseley.

Kuribayashi later recalled,

"I was in the United States for three years when I was a captain. I was taught how to drive by some American officers, and I bought a car. I went around the States, and I knew the close connections between the military and industry. I saw the plant area of Detroit, too. By one button push, all the industries will be mobilized for military business."

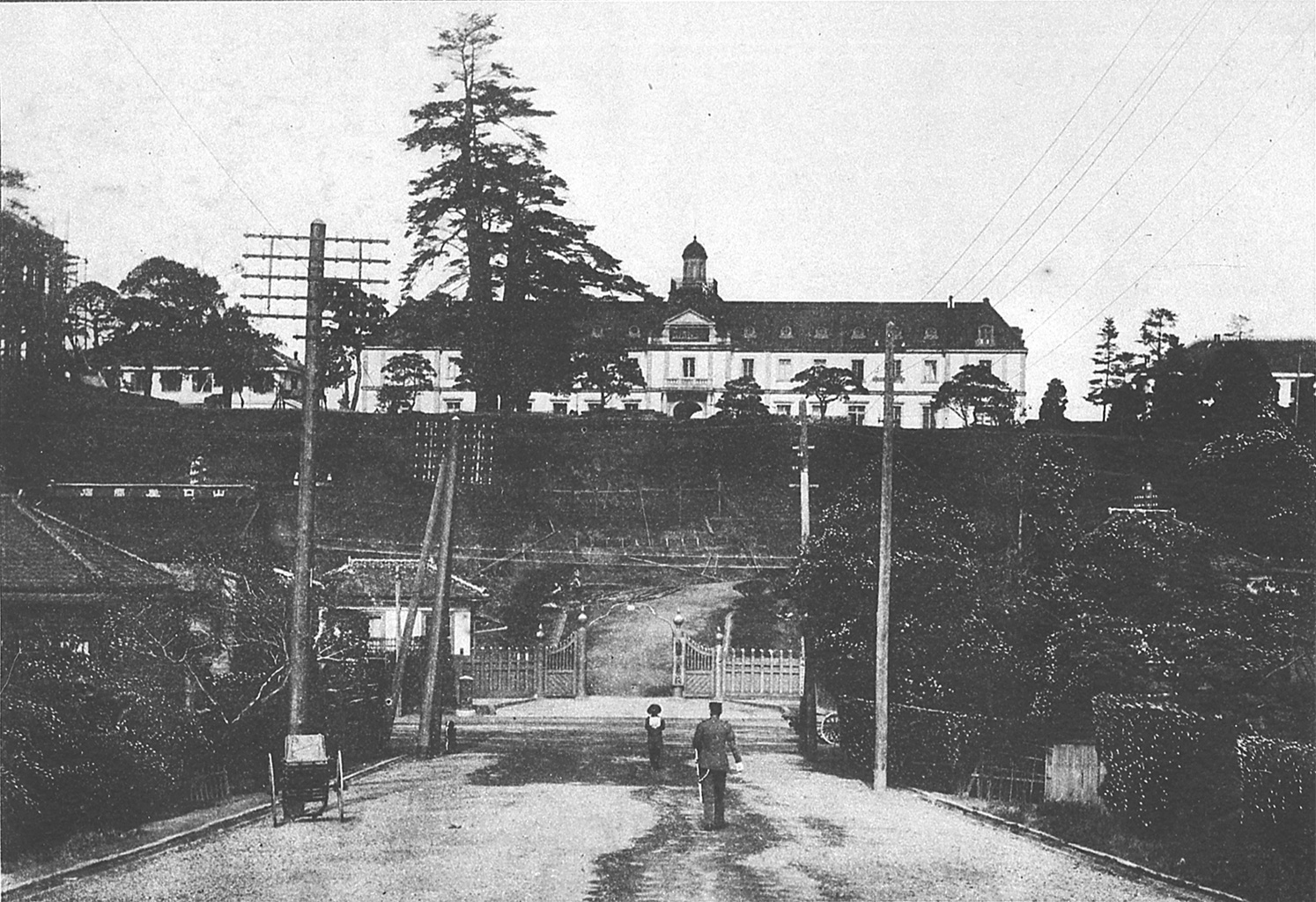
Imperial Japanese Army Academy, Tokyo 1907

According to his son, Taro Kuribayashi,

"From 1928 to 1930, my father stayed in the United States as an exchange officer. In those days, he often gave me, a grammar school boy, printed letters. He always composed easy letters in order to let me read them without any help from others. He used to enclose some sketches with the letters. I have made a book of these picture letters. In the letters are so many scenes – while visiting Boston, he was lying sprawled on the gardens of Harvard University watching a clock tower, in another he is taking a walk in Buffalo, in another, playing with some American children and being invited to the house of Medical Doctor Furukohchi, etc. Throughout his letters, it is clear that my father used to drive in many directions in the United States, studied very hard late at night, and tried to be a gentleman. Also, he used to have many friends in foreign countries."

After returning to Tokyo, Kuribayashi was promoted to the rank of major and appointed as the first Japanese military attaché to Canada. He was promoted to lieutenant colonel in 1933. During his services in the Imperial Japanese Army General Staff in Tokyo from 1933 to 1937, he wrote lyrics for several martial songs. In 1937, he was promoted to colonel, followed by another promotion in 1940 to major general.

During the lead up to the attack on Pearl Harbor, Kuribayashi is known to have repeatedly told his family, "America is the last country in the world Japan should fight."

== Pacific War ==
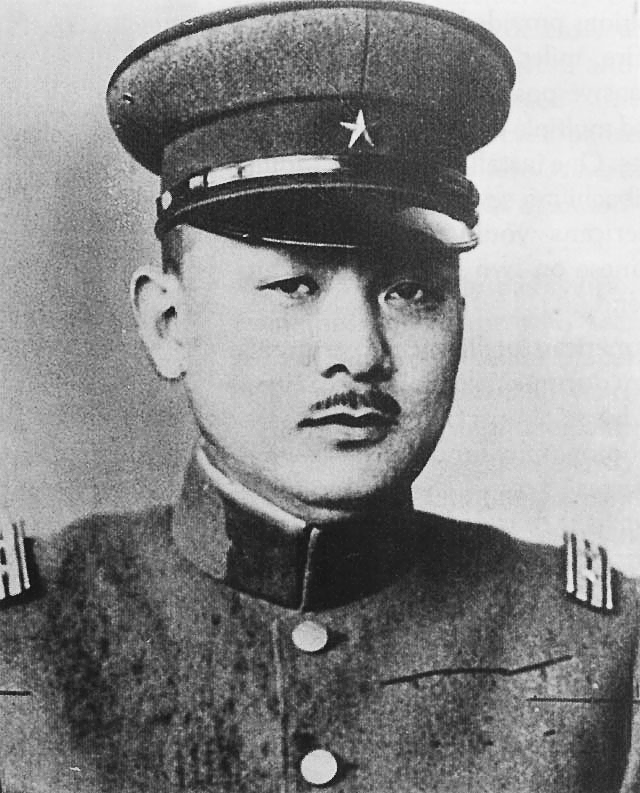
Tadamichi Kuribayashi as a lieutenant colonel, 1933-1937

In December 1941, Kuribayashi was ordered into the field as the Chief of Staff of the Japanese 23rd Army, commanded by Takashi Sakai. Stationed in Guangdong province at the beginning of the war, the 23rd Army was responsible for war crimes during the occupation of China and Hong Kong. As Chief of Staff to Sakai, Kuribayashi helped plan the Invasion of Hong Kong, which was launched on the same morning as the surprise attack on Pearl Harbor.

The 23rd Army's conduct in Hong Kong was characterized by brutality, numerous and widespread war crimes were reported against both Allied servicemen, nurses and civilians. After the war, Sakai was accused of war crimes at the Nanjing War Crimes Tribunal, found guilty of command responsibility for the extrajudicial murder of Chinese civilians and executed by firing squad on 30 September 1946. Kuribayashi however played a limited role in command and control during the invasion itself. He tried to persuade Sakai against court-martialing the commander of the 228th Regiment after the unit had captured Shing Mun Redoubt without orders. Afterwards he was relegated to dealing with diplomatic issues such as the sinking of Soviet vessels. According to a former subordinate, General Kuribayashi regularly visited wounded enlisted men in the hospital, which was virtually unheard of for an officer of the Imperial General Staff.

In 1943, he was promoted to lieutenant general, and reassigned to be commander of the 2nd Imperial Guards Division, which was primarily a reserve and training division. On 27 May 1944, he became commander of the 109th Infantry Division.

Just two weeks later, on 8 June 1944, he received orders signed by Prime Minister Hideki Tojo to defend the strategically located island of Iwo Jima in the Bonin Islands chain. According to Yoshii Kuribayashi, her husband said upon receiving the orders that it was unlikely even for his ashes to return from Iwo Jima.

According to historian Kumiko Kakehashi, it is possible that Kuribayashi was deliberately selected for what was known to be a suicide mission. General Kuribayashi was known for having expressed the belief that Japan's war against the United States was a no win situation and needed to be ended via a negotiated peace. In the eyes of the ultra-nationalists in the Imperial General Staff and in Tojo's cabinet, this had allegedly caused Kuribayashi to be seen as a defeatist.

He was accorded the honor of a personal audience with Emperor Hirohito on the eve of his departure. In a subsequent letter to Yoshii and their children, the general made no mention of meeting the Emperor. He instead expressed regret for failing to fix the draft in the kitchen of their home. He included a detailed diagram so that his son, Taro Kuribayashi would be able to complete the repair and prevent the family from catching cold.

=== Planning for the Battle of Iwo Jima ===
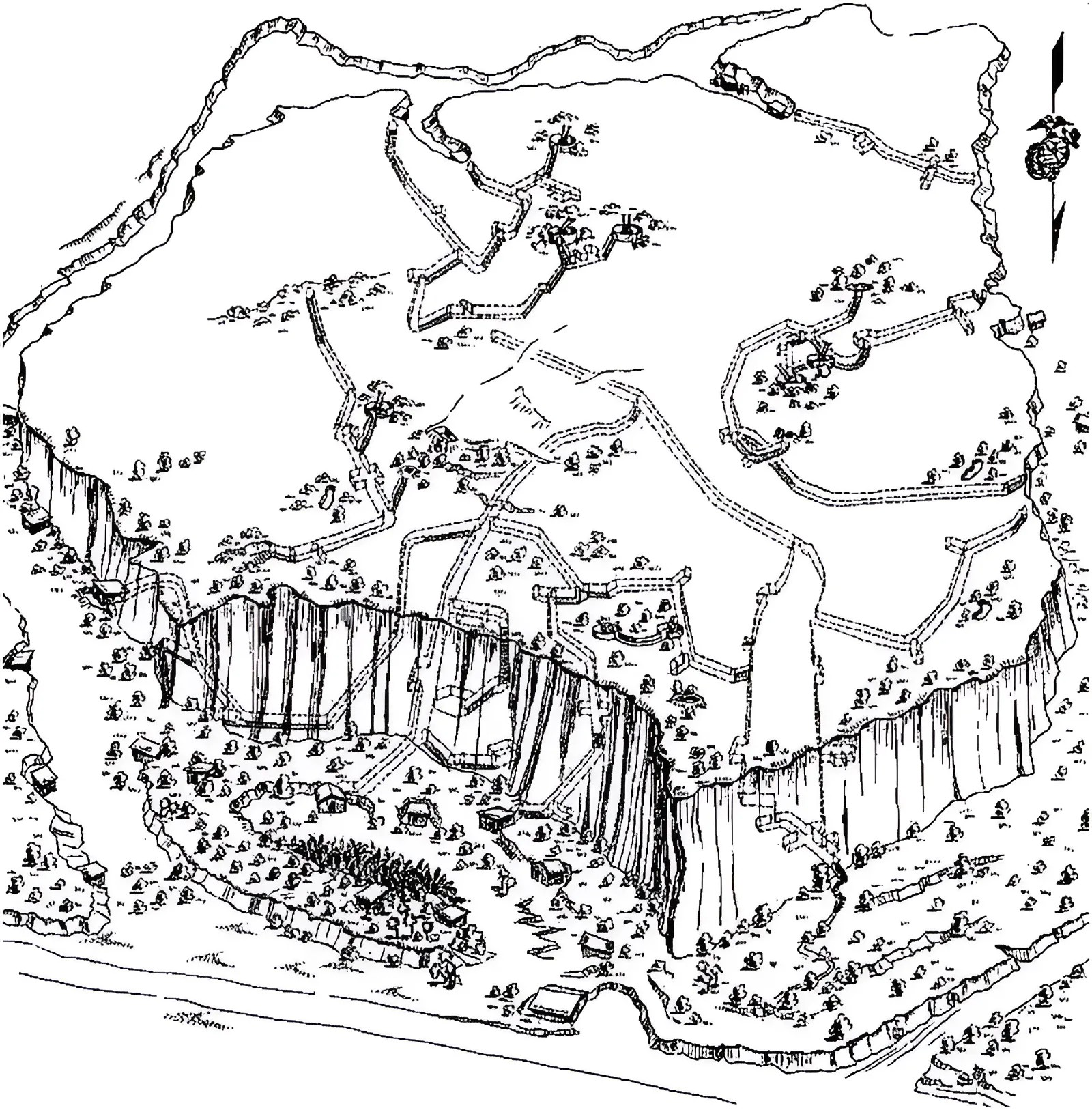
Tunnels on Iwo Jima

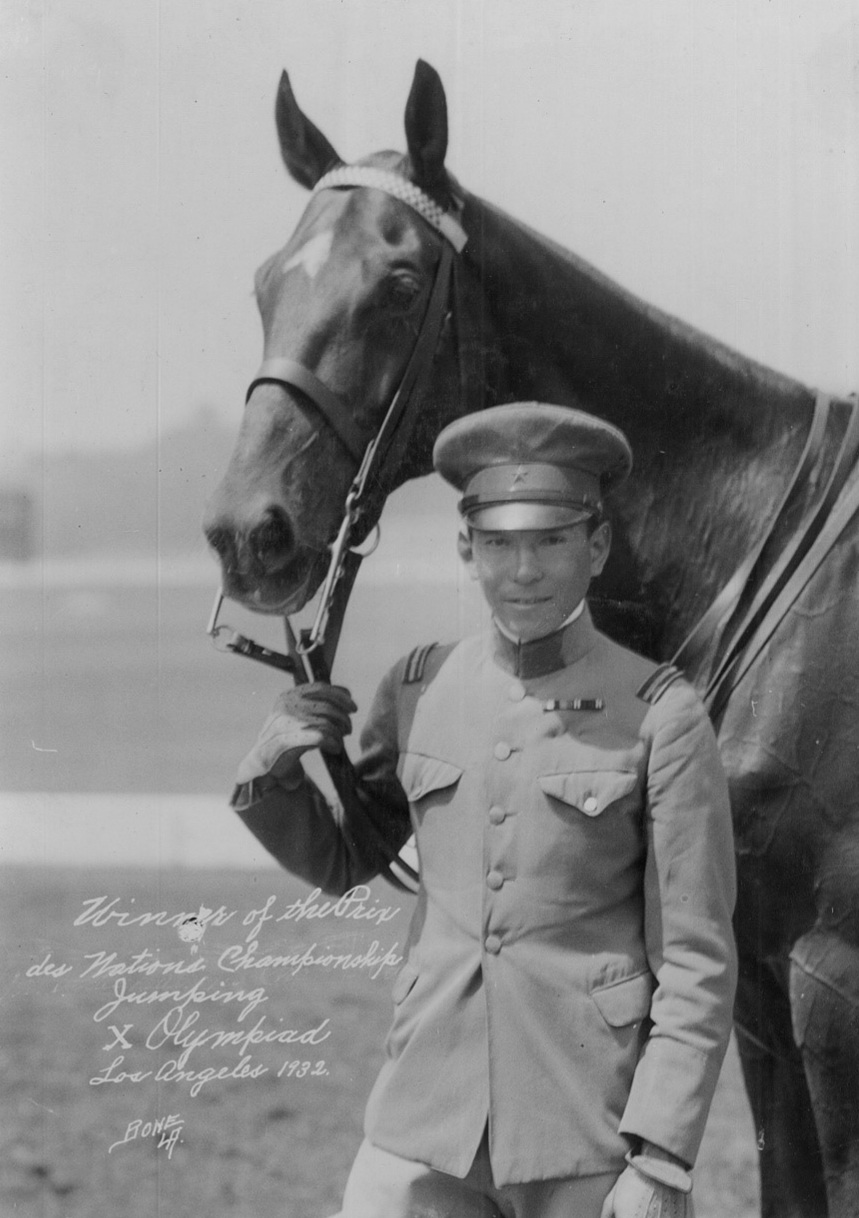
Lieutenant Colonel Baron Takeichi Nishi, an Olympic Gold Medalist at the 1932 Los Angeles Olympics, who was killed in action on Iwo Jima

On 19 June 1944, General Kuribayashi stepped off a plane on Iwo Jima's Chidori airstrip. Meanwhile, the island's garrison was busy digging trenches on the beach. Kuribayashi made a careful survey of the island and ordered his men to construct defenses further inland. Deciding not to seriously contest the projected beach landings, Kuribayashi decreed that the defense of Iwo Jima would be fought almost entirely from underground. His men honeycombed the island with more than 18 kilometers (11 mi) of tunnels, 5,000 caves, and pillboxes. According to his former Chief of Staff, Kuribayashi often told him,

"America's productive powers are beyond our imagination. Japan has started a war with a formidable enemy and we must brace ourselves accordingly."

Kuribayashi recognized that he would not be able to hold Iwo Jima against the overwhelming military forces of the United States. He knew, however, that the loss of Iwo Jima would place all of Japan within range of American strategic bombers. Therefore, he planned a campaign of attrition, by which he hoped to delay the bombing of Japanese civilians and to force the United States Government to reconsider the possible invasion of Japanese home islands.

According to historian James Bradley,

"Americans have always taken casualties very seriously. When the number of casualties is too high, public opinion will boil up and condemn an operation as a failure, even if we get the upper hand militarily. Kuribayashi had lived in America. He knew our national character. That's why he deliberately chose to fight in a way that would relentlessly drive up the number of casualties. I think he hoped American public opinion would shift toward wanting to bring the war with Japan to a rapid end."

Long before the Americans landed, however, Gen. Kuribayashi fully expected to die on Iwo Jima. On 5 September 1944, he wrote to his wife,

"It must be destiny that we as a family must face this. Please accept this and stand tall with the children at your side. I will be with you always."

The Japanese defenders include Private Takeo Abe, who survived the battle and spent the remainder of his life repatriating the remains of his comrades. Private Abe later recalled,

"By the end of 1944, we were forced to spare rations for battle and we foraged around for edible weeds. Suffering from chronic diarrhea, empty stomachs, and lack of water, we dug bunkers in the sand under a merciless sun and constructed underground shelters that were steamy with heat. We used salt water, lukewarm from a well on the beach, for cooking, and saved what little rainwater we could for drinking. But one water-bottle a day was the most we ever had to drink."

On 25 June 1944, Kuribayashi wrote to his family,

"There is no springwater here, so we must do with rainwater. I long for a glass of cold water, but nothing can be done. The number of flies and mosquitoes is appalling. There are no newspapers, no radios, and no shops. There are a few local farms, but no shelters suitable for anything other than livestock. Our soldiers pitch tents or crawl into caves. The caves are stuffy and the heat and humidity are intolerable. I, of course, endure similar living conditions... It is a living hell and I have never experienced anything remotely like it in my entire life."

In order to prepare his soldiers for an unconventional style of fighting, Kuribayashi composed six "Courageous Battle Vows" which were widely reproduced and distributed among his men. They read:

1. We shall defend this island with all our strength to the end.
2. We shall fling ourselves against the enemy tanks clutching explosives to destroy them.
3. We shall slaughter the enemy, dashing in among them to kill them.
4. Every one of our shots shall be on target and kill the enemy.
5. We shall not die until we have killed ten of the enemy.
6. We shall continue to harass the enemy with guerrilla tactics even if only one of us remains alive.

Kuribayashi also composed a set of instructions to the soldiers of the "Courage Division." They read as follows:

Preparations for battle.
1. Use every moment you have, whether during air raids or during battle, to build strong positions that enable you to smash the enemy at a ratio of ten to one.
2. Build fortifications that enable you to shoot and attack in any direction without pausing even if your comrades should fall.
3. Be resolute and make rapid preparations to store food and water in your position so that your supplies will last even through intense barrages.

Fighting defensively.
1. Destroy the American devils with heavy fire. Improve your aim and try to hit your target the first time.
2. As we practiced, refrain from reckless charges, but take advantage of the moment when you've smashed the enemy. Watch out for bullets from others of the enemy.
3. When one man dies a hole opens up in your defense. Exploit man-made structures and natural features for your own protection. Take care with camouflage and cover.
4. Destroy enemy tanks with explosives, and several enemy soldiers along with the tank. This is your best chance for meritorious deeds.
5. Do not be alarmed should tanks come toward you with a thunderous rumble. Shoot at them with anti-tank fire and use tanks.
6. Do not be afraid if the enemy penetrates inside your position. Resist stubbornly and shoot them dead.
7. Control is difficult to exercise if you are sparsely dispersed over a wide area. Always tell the officers in charge when you move forward.
8. Even if your commanding officer falls, continue defending your position, by yourself if necessary. Your most important duty is to perform brave deeds.
9. Do not think about eating and drinking, but focus on exterminating the enemy. Be brave, O warriors, even if rest and sleep are impossible.
10. The strength of each of you is the cause of our victory. Soldiers of the Courage Division, do not crack at the harshness of the battle and try to hasten your death.
11. We will finally prevail if you make the effort to kill just one man more. Die after killing ten men and yours is a glorious death on the battlefield.
12. Keep on fighting even if you are wounded in the battle. Do not get taken prisoner. At the end, stab the enemy as he stabs you."

=== Battle of Iwo Jima ===
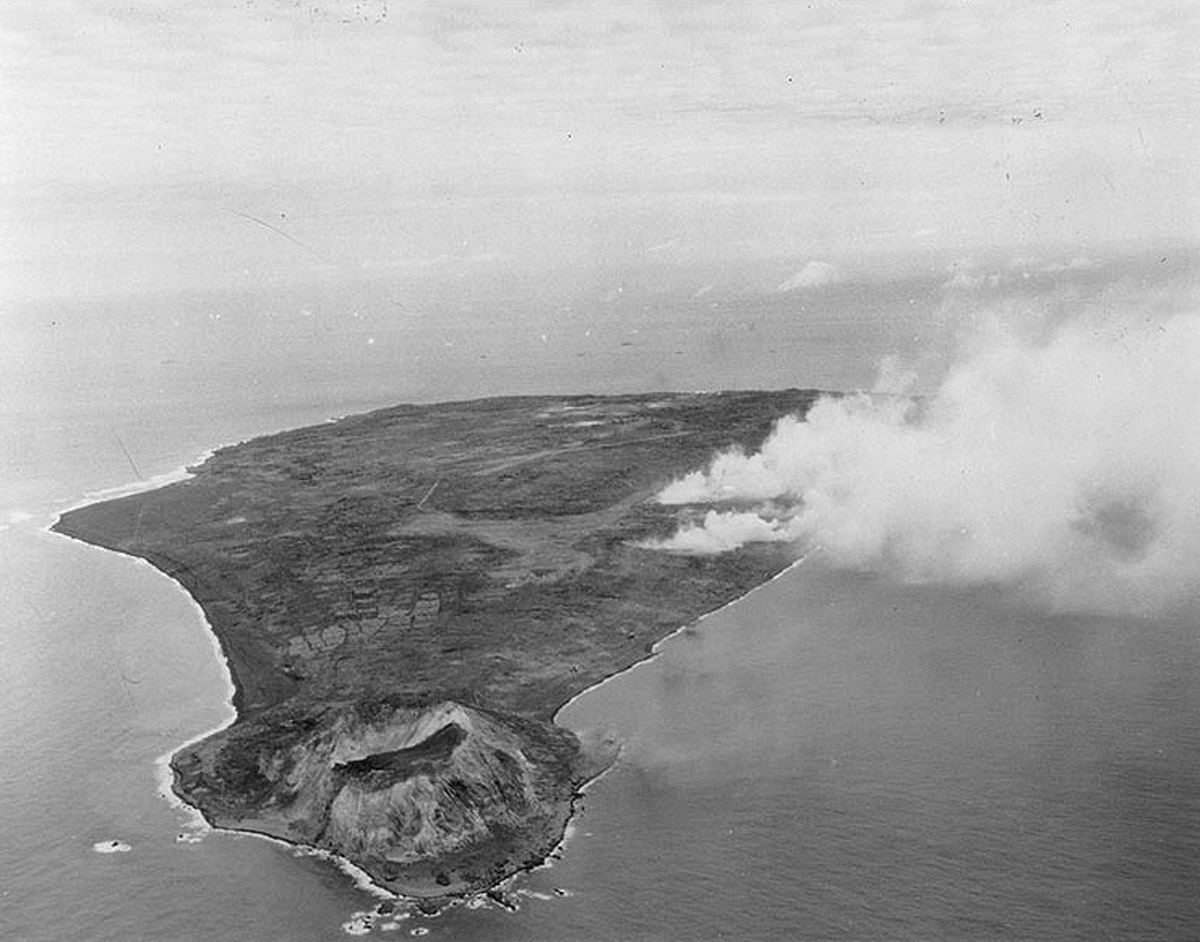
Battle of Iwo Jima (17 February 1945

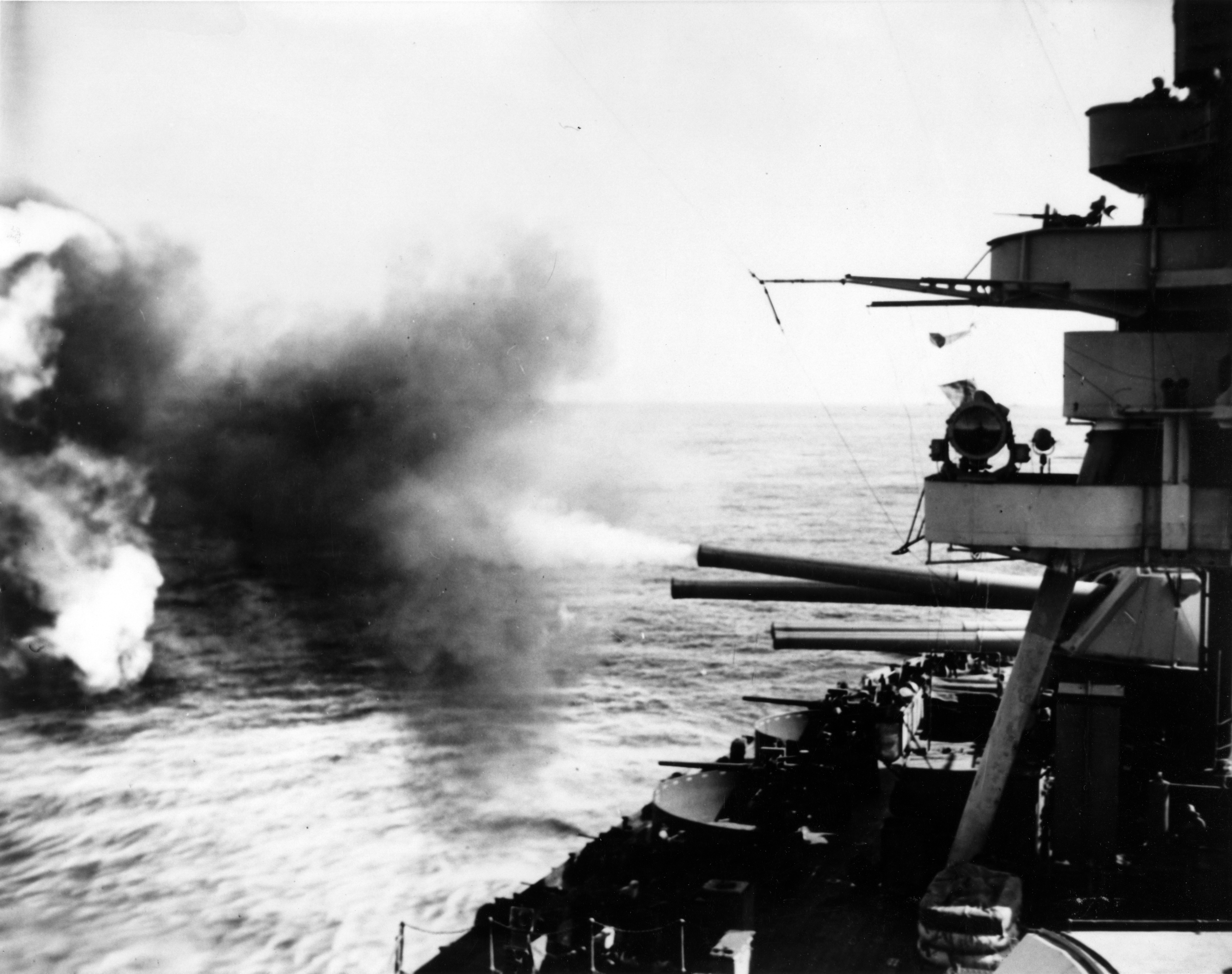
The battleship USS New York firing her 356 mm (14.0 in) main guns on the island, 16 February 1945

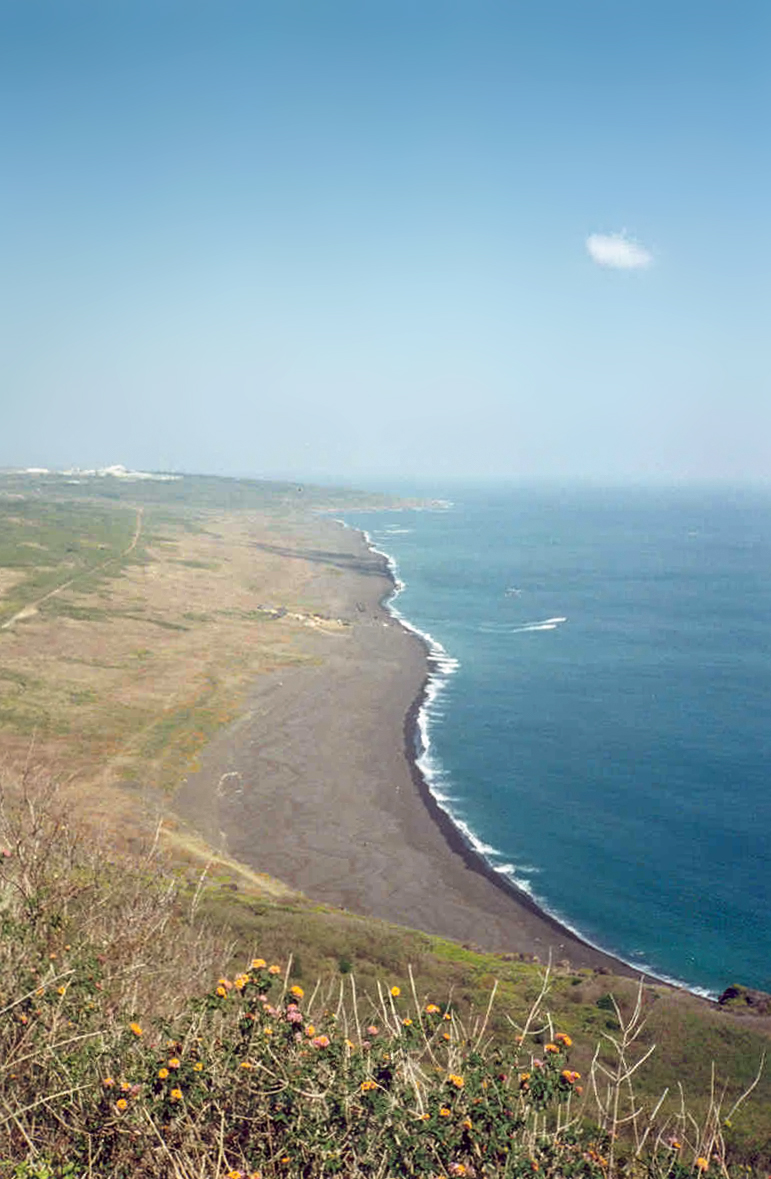
View of the invasion beach from the top of Mount Suribachi, February 2002

On 19 February 1945, the United States Marine Corps landed its first men on the southern shore of the island. In a radically different approach, American officers and men were first allowed to land unmolested and then shelled and machine gunned from underground bunkers. As night fell, Marine Corps General Holland Smith studied reports aboard the command ship USS Eldorado. He was especially stunned that Kuribayashi's men had never attempted a banzai charge. Addressing a group of war correspondents, he quipped,

"I don't know who he is, but the Japanese General running this show is one smart bastard."

According to military historian Shigetoki Hosoki,

"This writer was stunned to find the following comments in the 'Iwo Jima Report,' a collection of memoirs by Iwo Jima survivors. 'The men we saw weighed no more than thirty kilos and did not look human. Nonetheless, these emaciated soldiers who looked like they came from Mars faced the enemy with a force that could not be believed. I sensed a high morale.' Even under such circumstances, the underground shelters that the Japanese built proved advantageous for a while. Enemy mortar and bombing could not reach them ten meters under the ground. It was then that the Americans began to dig holes and poured yellow phosphorus gas into the ground. Their infantry was also burning its way through passages, slowly but surely, at the rate of ten meters per hour. A telegram has been preserved which says, 'This is like killing cockroaches.' American troops made daily advances to the north. On the evening of 16 March, they reported that they had completely occupied the island of Iwo Jima."

Meanwhile, General Kuribayashi had herded the remnants of the Iwo Jima garrisons into a heavily fortified ravine which the Marine Corps dubbed, "The Gorge." Major Yoshitaka Hori, who commanded the Chichi Jima radio station, later recalled,

"General Kuribayashi commanded his battle under candle light without a single rest or sleep, day after day. Radio broadcasts, newspapers, and magazines from Japan encouraged him thoroughly, especially when the old and young men, boys and girls of his native place prayed to God for his victory."

Marine Corps General Graves Erskine sent Japanese American Marines and captured Japanese soldiers to try to persuade Kuribayashi and his men to surrender. Meanwhile, Kuribayashi radioed to Major Hori,

"I have 400 men under my command. The enemy besieged us by firing and flame from their tanks. In particular, they are trying to approach the entrance of our cave with explosives. My men and officers are still fighting. The enemy's front lines are 300 meters from us, and they are attacking by tank firing. They advised us to surrender by loudspeaker, but we only laughed at this childish trick, and we did not set ourselves against them."

On the evening of 23 March 1945, Kuribayashi radioed a last message to Major Hori, "All officers and men of Chichi Jima – goodbye from Iwo." Major Hori later recalled, "I tried to communicate with them for three days after that, but in the end I received no answer."

On 17 March 1945, the General had sent his farewell message to Imperial Headquarters accompanied by three traditional death poems in waka form. All were, according to historian Kumiko Kakehashi, "a subtle protest against the military command that so casually sent men out to die."

General Kuribayashi had written,

"The battle is entering its final chapter. Since the enemy's landing, the gallant fighting of the men under my command has been such that even the gods would weep. In particular, I humbly rejoice in the fact that they have continued to fight bravely though utterly empty-handed and ill-equipped against a land, sea, and air attack of a material superiority such as surpasses the imagination. One after another they are falling in the ceaseless and ferocious attacks of the enemy. For this reason, the situation has arisen whereby I must disappoint your expectations and yield this important place to the hands of the enemy. With humility and sincerity, I offer my repeated apologies. Our ammunition is gone and our water dried up. Now is the time for us to make the final counterattack and fight gallantly, conscious of the Emperor's favor, not begrudging our efforts though they turn our bones to powder and pulverize our bodies. I believe that until the island is recaptured, the Emperor's domain will be eternally insecure. I therefore swear that even when I have become a ghost I shall look forward to turning the defeat of the Imperial Army to victory. I stand now at the beginning of the end. At the same time as revealing my inmost feelings, I pray earnestly for the unfailing victory and security of the Empire. Farewell for all eternity."

He closed the message with three waka poems as follows:

Unable to complete this heavy task for our country
Arrows and bullets all spent, so sad we fall.

But unless I smite the enemy,
My body cannot rot in the field.
Yea, I shall be born again seven times
And grasp the sword in my hand.

When ugly weeds cover this island,
My sole thought shall be the Imperial Land.

=== Death ===
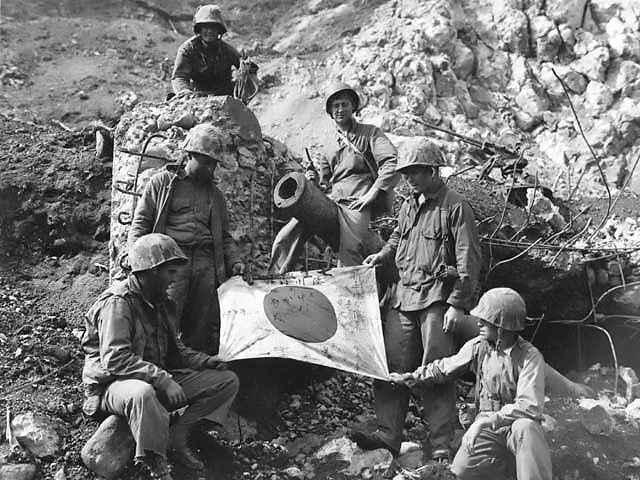
U.S. Marines pose on top of an enemy pillbox with a captured Japanese flag

The exact circumstances of Kuribayashi's death remain a mystery. It is most likely that he was killed in action in the early morning of 26 March 1945, while leading his surviving soldiers in a three-pronged assault against sleeping Marines and Air Force ground crews. Kuribayashi and his men silently slashed tents, bayoneted sleeping men, and lobbed hand grenades. According to the official United States Marine Corps History, "The Japanese attack on the early morning of 26 March was not a banzai charge, but an excellent plan aiming to cause maximum confusion and destruction." The assault climaxed in a hand-to-hand battle to the death between the men of both armies. The General's body could not be identified afterwards for he had removed all officer's insignia in order to fight as a regular soldier.

According to less credible theories, Kuribayashi is alleged to have committed seppuku at his headquarters in the Gorge.

The General's son, Taro Kuribayashi, interviewed several survivors of the Japanese garrison after the war. As a result, he believes that his father was killed in an artillery barrage during the final assault.

According to Taro Kuribayashi,

"My father had believed it shameful to have his body discovered by the enemy even after death, so he had previously asked his two soldiers to come along with him, one in front and the other behind, with a shovel in hand. In case of his death, he had wanted them to bury his body there and then. It seems that my father and the soldiers were killed by shells, and he was buried at the foot of a tree in Chidori village, along the beach near Osaka mountain. Afterwards, General Smith spent a whole day looking for his body to pay respect accordingly and to perform a burial, but in vain."

== Legacy ==
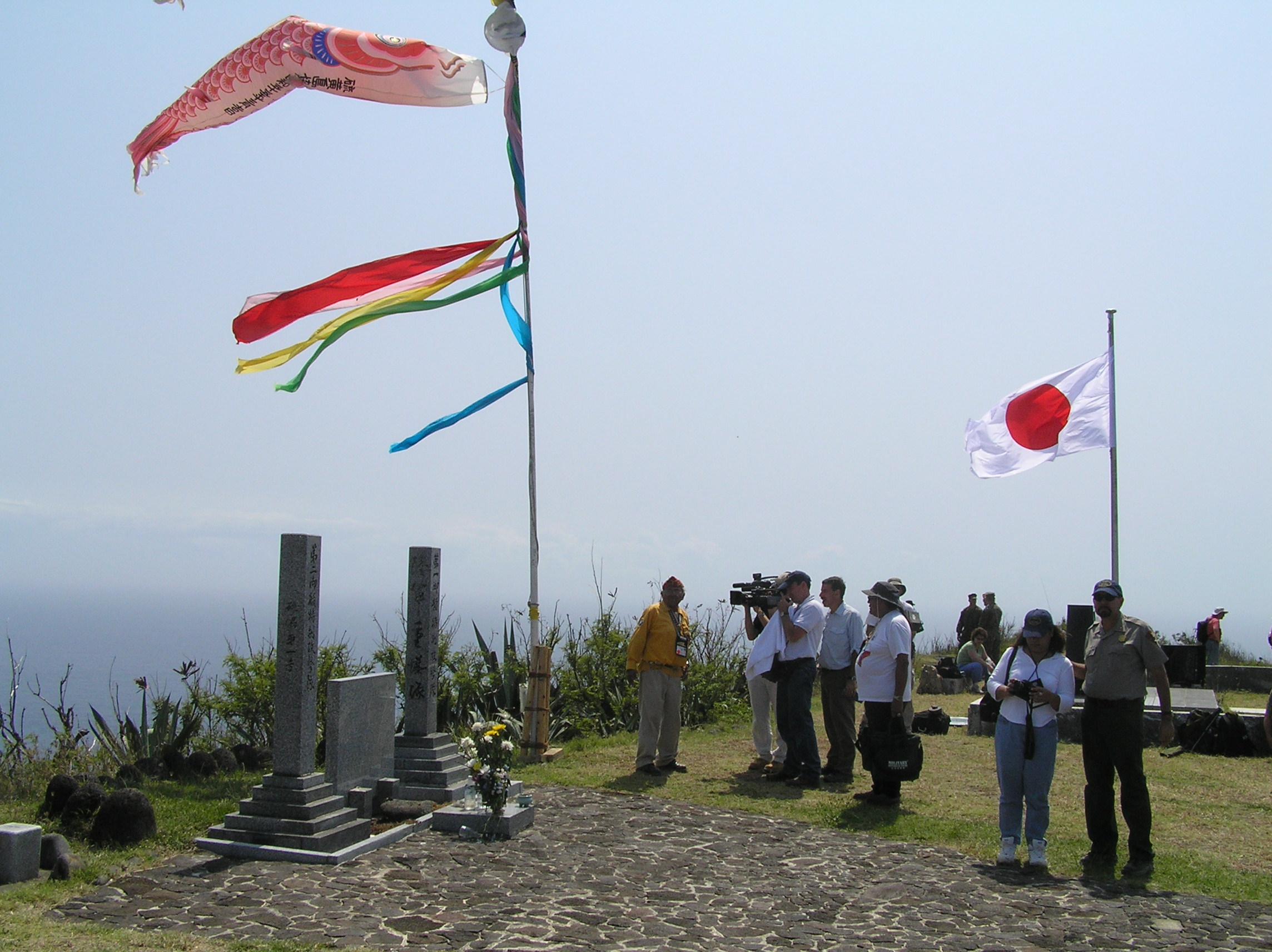
The 60th Anniversary Reunion at the Japanese Memorial, Iwo Jima

The US declared Iwo Jima secure on 26 March 1945, after suffering 26,039 casualties. Only 1,083 of the 22,786 Japanese defenders survived to be captured. A small number of holdouts continued to remain at large, leaving their fortified caves at night in order to steal food from the American garrison. The last two holdouts, Naval machine gunners Yamakage Kufuku and Matsudo Linsoki, surrendered on 6 January 1949.

Yoshii Kuribayashi was only 40 years old when her husband died on Iwo Jima, and she subsequently worked hard to bring up their children without a father. According to their daughter Takako Kuribayashi, "My mother had been brought up as a lady, and even after getting married she had been taken care of by my father. She had never worked in her life before, but she still managed to raise us during the terrible years after the war by doing things like selling cuttlefish out on the street. And more than that, she sent not just my elder brother, but me, a girl, to university."

In 1970, during the lead up to a reunion of Japanese and American veterans of the battle to be held on Iwo Jima, Yoshii Kuribayashi represented Japanese families of war dead at a luncheon in Tokyo with American veterans. In a speech she thanked them for their expressions of friendship and received a standing ovation. She would later attend both the 1985 and 1995 Reunions of Honor hosted on the island.

According to Derrick Wright,

"The name of Gen. Kuribayashi has been accorded a place of honor in postwar Japanese history, alongside that other outstanding commander Adm. Yamamoto. In his autobiography, Coral and Brass, Lt.-Gen. Holland 'Howling Mad' Smith paid him one of his highest tributes: 'Of all our adversaries in the Pacific, Kuribayashi was the most redoubtable.'"

== Personal life ==
Kuribayashi married Yoshii Kuribayashi (1904–2003) on 8 December 1923. Together they had a son and two daughters (Taro, Yoko and Takako).

== In popular culture ==
Kuribayashi became known to an international audience after being portrayed onscreen in the film Letters from Iwo Jima. According to screenwriter Iris Yamashita, "Ultimately, I felt that the many nuances of Tadamichi Kuribayashi came to life onscreen under Clint Eastwood's masterful direction and actor Ken Watanabe's deft portrayal, expressing the perfect sense of the balance of the gentleness and warmth of the family man, combined with the strength, practicality and regality of the commanding officer."

=== Promotions ===
Promotions
Collar insignia	Date
大将, Tai-sho (General)	17 March 1945
中将, Chu-jo (Lieutenant General)	June 1943
少将, Sho-sho (Major General)	March 1940
大佐, Tai-sa (Colonel)	August 1937
中佐, Chu-sa (Lieutenant Colonel)	August 1933
少佐, Sho-sa (Major)	March 1930
大尉, Tai-i (Captain)	August 1923
中尉, Chu-i (First Lieutenant)	July 1918
Commissioned 少尉, Sho-i (Second Lieutenant)	December 1911

== See also ==
- Yoshitaka Shindō – Japanese political figure and grandson of General Kuribayashi.
