= 3rd Guards Division (Imperial Japanese Army) =

- Active: 1944-1945
- Disbanded: 1945
- Country: Empire of Japan
- Branch: Imperial Japanese Army
- Size: Division
- Engagements: World War II

The Imperial Japanese Army's 3rd Guards Division (近衛第3師団, Konoe Dai-san Shidan) was formed in 1944 from the 8th, 9th and 10th Guards Regiments and stayed in Japan to defend the homeland during the Second World War.

3rd Guards Division

- 8th Guards Regiment
- 9th Guards Regiment
- 10th Guards Regiment

== See also ==
- Imperial Guard (Japan)
