= 7th Division (Imperial Japanese Army) =

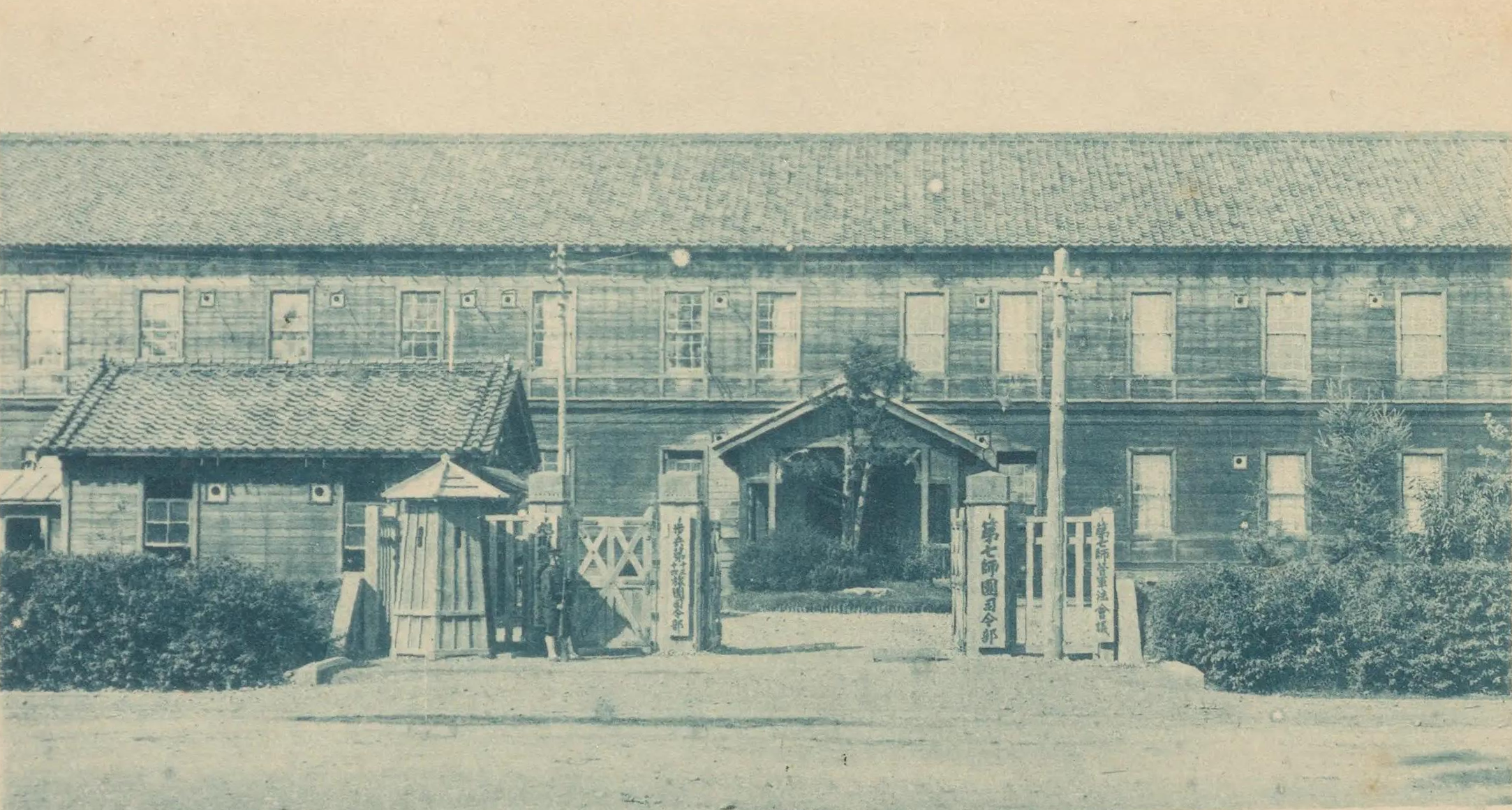
- Headquarter of the 7th Division
- Active: 12 May 1888 – September 1945
- Country: (Empire of Japan) Japan
- Branch: Imperial Japanese Army
- Type: Infantry
- Garrison/HQ: Asahikawa, Hokkaido, Japan
- Nicknames: Bear Division (熊兵団, Kuma-heidan); North-Subduing Division (北鎮部隊, Hokuchin-butai)
- Engagements: Russo-Japanese War: Siege of Port Arthur; Battle of Mukden; Siberian Intervention; Second Sino Japanese War; Soviet–Japanese border conflicts: Battles of Khalkhin Gol; World War II: Aleutian Islands campaign; Japanese occupation of Attu; Guadalcanal campaign; Battle of the Tenaru; Battle of Edson's Ridge; Kokoda Track campaign

Commanders
- Notable commanders: Nagayama Takeshirō; Ueda Arisawa; Uehara Yusaku; Watanabe Jōtarō; Osami Okiie

7th Division (第7師団, Dai-shichi Shidan) was an infantry division in the Imperial Japanese Army. Its call-sign was the Bear Division (熊兵団, Kuma-heidan).

The 7th Division was formed in Sapporo, Hokkaidō on 12 May 1888, as the first new infantry division formed by the reorganization of the Imperial Japanese Army from six regional commands to a divisional command structure. The reorganization was recommended by Prussian military advisor Jakob Meckel. It was responsible for the defence of Hokkaidō, which it divided into four operational areas (Sapporo, Hakodate, Asahikawa and Kushiro). As one of the projects of the Japanese government was to encourage the settlement of Hokkaidō by ex-soldiers, the 7th Division was over-strength, and contained many soldiers originally from other areas of Japan. The territorial division was converted to a field infantry division on 12 May 1896, in the aftermath of the First Sino-Japanese War. On 30 October 1901, most of division's units were transferred to Takasu village in Kamikawa (Ishikari) District, Hokkaido, where previously only the 28th Infantry Regiment was located. After an extensive building project, the division moved to its new headquarters in Takasu on 21 October 1902, and 25 October 1902 the Sapporo military prison was moved to the same location.

== Action ==
=== Russo-Japanese War to Soviet–Japanese border conflicts ===
The 7th Division saw combat during the Russo-Japanese War, where it was assigned to the Siege of Port Arthur, and later to the Battle of Mukden. Assigned to Manchuria from 1917-1919, it also participated in the Siberian Intervention beginning on 6 June 1918. The division returned to Asahikawa, Hokkaido on 5 May 1919.

It was reassigned to Manchuria twice in 1934 and 1936, performing police duties without significant events. In February 1938, the 7th Division was permanently assigned to Kwantung Army, but arrived too late to participate in the Battle of Lake Khasan in July 1938. Parts of it reinforced the 23rd Division during the disastrous Battles of Khalkhin Gol in 1939. By September 1939, the entire division had arrived at the front lines, with the 26th Infantry Regiment being noted in particular for halting an advance by Chinese Communist forces. Because Hokkaido was left mostly undefended, the 7th Division eventually returned to Asahikawa, Hokkaido in August 1940, being subordinated directly to Imperial General Headquarters as part of the strategic reserve. Also in 1940, the 25th Infantry Regiment was transferred to the Sakhalin Mixed Brigade, which became the 88th Division in February 1945. As result, the 7th Division became a triangular division.

=== Pacific War ===
In 1942, despite its specialization in Arctic warfare, the 28th Infantry Regiment of the 7th Division under the command of Kiyonao Ichiki was assigned to invade Midway in the central Pacific. After the Japanese defeat at the Battle of Midway, which caused the cancellation of the invasion of Midway, the regiment was on its way back to Japan when it was rerouted to Guadalcanal in the Solomon Islands in August 1942. Also, a detachment of the 7th Division was part of the Japanese occupation of Attu. At Guadalcanal, the regiment took heavy casualties during the Battle of the Tenaru and the Battle of Edson's Ridge. Of the 2500 men who were sent to the Guadalcanal campaign, only 140 returned alive to Japan.

The remainder of the division remained as the Asahikawa, Hokkaido garrison until March 1944. At that time it was moved to Obihiro in eastern Hokkaido, relieved by the 77th Division at Asahikawa. The infantry regiments fortified the Nakashibetsu, Hokkaido area, building a network of pillboxes stretching from Nemuro to Kushiro. The division was disbanded with the surrender of Japan in September 1945.

== See also ==
- List of Japanese Infantry Divisions
- List of IJA Mixed Brigades

== Reference and further reading ==
- This article incorporates material from the Japanese Wikipedia page 第7師団 (日本軍)
- Madej, W. Victor (1981). Japanese Armed Forces Order of Battle, 1937–1945. Allentown, PA: Game Publishing Company. OCLC 8930220.
- United States War Department; David Isby (Introduction) and Jeffrey Ethell (Afterword) (1991) [1944]. Handbook on Japanese Military Forces. Baton Rouge and London: Louisiana State University Press. ISBN 0-8071-2013-8.
Japanese infantry and armored units in Home Islands, 15 August 1945
