= Twenty-Second Army (Japan) =

Japanese Twenty-Second Army
- Active: February 9, 1940 - November 9, 1940
- Country: Empire of Japan
- Branch: Imperial Japanese Army
- Type: Infantry
- Role: Corps
- Garrison/HQ: Nanning
- Nickname(s): Wa (和, Harmony)
- Engagements: Invasion of French Indochina

The Japanese 22nd Army (第22軍, Dai-nijyuni gun) was a short-lived army of the Imperial Japanese Army during the Second Sino-Japanese War.

== History ==
The Japanese 22nd Army was formed on February 9, 1940 under the Japanese Southern China Area Army, and served as a garrison force for the southern Chinese province of Guangxi. It participated in a number of combat operations during the Battle of South Guangxi.

At the time of the Invasion of French Indochina, its commanding officer, Lieutenant General Seiichi Kuno violated direct orders from Tokyo, and joined in the attack and occupation of portions of Annam, during the Invasion of French Indochina. Due to this insubordination, he was relieved of command, and the Japanese 22nd Army was disbanded on November 9, 1940. Its divisions were reassigned to other areas.

== List of Commanders ==
	Name	From	To
Commanding officer	Lieutenant General Seiichi Kuno	10 February 1940	19 November 1940
Chief of Staff	Lieutenant General Tadaichi Wakamatsu	10 February 1940	19 November 1940
