= Guards Mixed Brigade =

Defunct Imperial Japanese Army unit

The Guards Mixed Brigade was a military unit of the Imperial Japanese Army.

== History ==
In September 1939 the 1st Guards Brigade of the Japanese Imperial Guards Division was split off and transferred to South China to become known as the Guards Mixed Brigade.

The Mixed Brigade took with it the 1st and 2nd Guards Infantry Regiments, the Guards Cavalry Regiment, and about half of the other support and service units. There it defended against the Chinese 1939-40 winter offensive and participated in the later part of the Battle of South Guangxi.

In October 1940, the Guards Mixed Brigade joined other Japanese units occupying French Indochina. In April 1941 it returned to Tokyo, but did not re-join the Imperial Guards Division.

In June 1943 the 1st Guards Division (Imperial Japanese Army) was formed from the Guards Mixed Brigade in Tokyo.

== Organization ==
Structure of the division in 1941:

- Headquarters
- Guards Regiment
- 3rd Guards Regiment
- 4th Guards Regiment
- 5th Guards Regiment
- Guards Field Artillery Regiment
- Guards Reconnaissance Regiment
- Guards Engineer Regiment
- Guards Transport Regiment

== See also ==
- Imperial Guard (Japan)
- List of IJA Mixed Brigades
