= 2nd Guards Division (Imperial Japanese Army) =

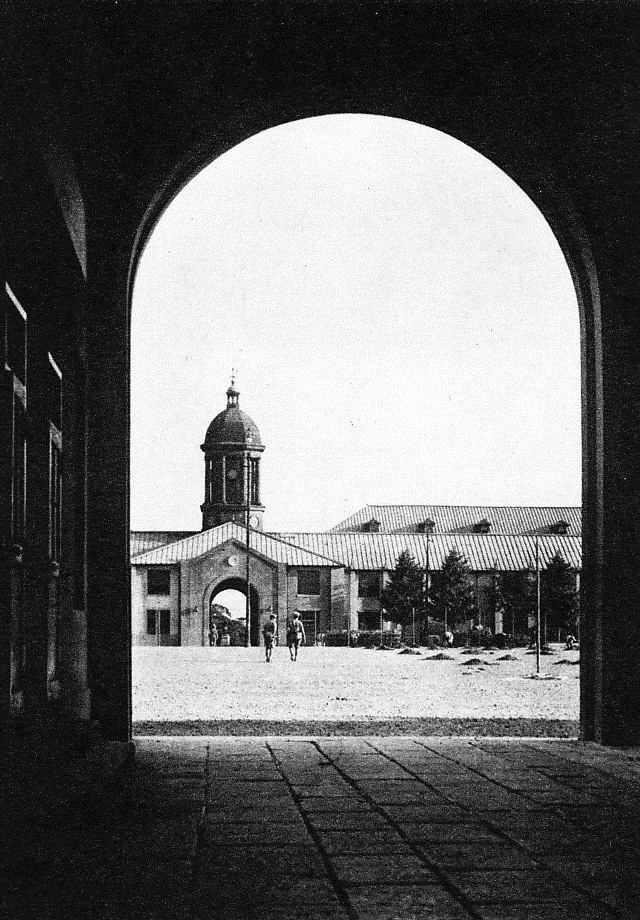
- Barracks of Imperial Guard Divisions circa 1940
- Active: 1943-1945
- Disbanded: 1945
- Country: Japan Empire of Japan
- Branch: Imperial Japanese Army
- Type: Imperial Guard
- Size: Division
- Engagements: World War II

Commanders
- Notable commanders: Tadamichi Kuribayashi

The Imperial Japanese Army's 2nd Guards Division (近衛第2師団, Konoe Dai-ni Shidan) was renumbered from the Imperial Guards Division in June 1943, when the 1st Guards Division was activated.

Its organization was:

2nd Guards Division

- 3rd Guards Infantry Regiment
- 4th Guards Infantry Regiment
- 5th Guards Infantry Regiment
- Guards Recon Regiment
- 2nd Guards Field Artillery Regiment
- 2nd Guards Field Engineer Regiment
- Support units

== See also ==
- Imperial Guard (Japan)
- Hirohara Shrine ‒ Last Shinto shrine in Southeast Asia, built by the 2nd Guards Division.
