= Battle of South Guangxi =

Battle

Coordinates: 23.8055°N 108.9840°E

- Part of the Second Sino-Japanese War
- Li Jishen, Chen Cheng, Zhang Fakui, and other ROC commanders at the Battle of South Guangxi
Date	November 15, 1939 – November 30, 1940 (1 year, 2 weeks and 1 day)
Location	Southern part of Guangxi province in the Republic of China
Result	Japanese withdrawal from Nanning after the successful invasion of French Indochina

Belligerents
China	(Empire of Japan) Japan

Commanders and leaders
(Republic of China (1912–1949)) Bai Chongxi (Republic of China (1912–1949)) Zhang Fakui	(Empire of Japan) Rikichi Andō (Empire of Japan) Seiichi Kuno

Strength
150,000 (initially only 2 understrength army groups, reinforced by 2 army groups, including 200th Division (only mechanised force in NRA)); CAF 100 aircraft	100,000 (5th Division, 18th Division (elements), Guards Mixed Brigade, Taiwan Mixed Brigade); 100 aircraft 2 aircraft carriers 70 warships

Casualties and losses
From 15 November 1939 until 26 February 1940 : (Note: Based on incomplete statistics. See #Chinese casualties); 576 officers and 23,582 soldiers killed 932 officers and 29,630 soldiers wounded 203 officers and 9,366 soldiers missing 45 billion yuan worth of private & public property damage	Chinese Claim : Japanese Army : 23,349 killed or wounded 16 captured Collaborationist Army : 4 officers and 9 soldiers captured Japanese Claims : Until January 1940 : 5th Division : 1,282 killed, 2,800 wounded.; Taiwan Mixed Brigade : 157 killed , 125 wounded.; 18th Division : 10 killed, 52 wounded.; Guards Mixed Brigade : 29 killed, 147 wounded.; In the battle of Binyang (January 27 to February 6, 1940) : 295 killed, 1,307 wounded. Guards Mixed Brigade after the battle of Binyang : In the mopping-up operation at the west side of the Qinning road (February 21 to March 1, 1940) : 1 killed, 6 wounded; In the Jiangnan Operation (March 1 to April 7, 1940) : 21 killed, 44 wounded; In the second operation on the west road (May 27 to June 17, 1940) : 22 killed, 41 wounded; In the battle at the border of French Indochina (June 17 to July 22, 1940) : 5 killed, 6 wounded; Evacuation of Qinning (September 30 to October 27, 1940) : 37 killed, 139 wounded; 5th Division after the battle of Binyang : 42nd Infantry Regiment in the battles near Wutang and Qitang (February 11 to March 27, 1940) : 8 killed, 31 wounded; 9th Infantry Brigade in the battle near Lingshan (March 13 to March 26, 1940) : 26 killed, 108 wounded
- 11,147 civilians killed 2,161 civilians wounded 3,986 civilians missing Total: 17,294 civilians

The Battle of South Guangxi (traditional Chinese: 桂南會戰; simplified Chinese: 桂南会战; pinyin: Guìnán Huìzhàn) was one of the 22 major engagements between the National Revolutionary Army and Imperial Japanese Army during the Second Sino-Japanese War.

In November 1939, the Japanese landed on the coast of Guangxi and captured Nanning. In this battle, the Japanese successfully cut off Chongqing from the ocean, effectively severing foreign aid to China's war efforts by the sea, rendering Indochina, the Burma Road and The Hump the only ways to send aid to China.

The Chinese launched several major offensives that maximized Japanese casualties. A majority of the conflicts occurred in the fighting for Kunlun Pass. With the success of the Vietnam Expedition in September 1940, the Japanese were able to cut China off from Indochina. Now only the Burma Road and The Hump remained, ending the costly necessity of occupying Guangxi. By November 1940, Japanese forces had evacuated from Guangxi except from some coastal enclaves.

== Order of battle ==
On 3 February, Japan boasted they were winning the battle in Guangxi and that to Nanning's north they were going to trap 200,000 enemy troops.

On 5 February China reported recapturing a county to Nanning's east by 50 miles, Yongshun (Wingshun) and claiming to have killed over 2,000 Japanese at Binyang (Pingyang). In the short-term operation of the battle of Binyang from January 27 to February 6, 1940, the Japanese Army claimed 27,041 abandoned enemy corpses and 1,167 POWs while suffering 295 killed and 1,307 wounded. During this time period, excluding units whose casualties were unknown such as the New 19th Division and 175th Division of the 46th Corps, 155th Division of the 64th Corps, 118th Division of the 99th Corps, the New 33rd Division, and the 66th Corps, (Note: According to divisional commander Wang Yan, the 118th Division lost 400 soldiers killed, wounded, or missing during the battle of Binyang.) the Chinese Army reported suffering over 26,400 killed, wounded, or missing from the 2nd, 6th, and 36th Corps, the 156th Division of the 64th Corps, and the 92nd and 99th Divisions of the 99th Corps.

On 15 February China reported they were advancing on Nanning and only 15 miles away from the north of the city and were forcing the Japanese to retreat south.

On 16 February Chinese reported it was 14 miles north.

China reported retaking Lingshan on 29 March.

On October 30, 1940, the Chinese Army recaptured Nanning and claimed victory. In fact, according to General Zhang Fakui, the overall commander of the Fourth War Zone in the battle of Southern Guangxi after the battle of Binyang, while they had fought in a number of battles against the enemy during the occupation of Nanning, the Japanese Army withdrew from the city voluntarily after their invasion of Vietnam. For propaganda purposes, the Chinese Army reported victory every time the enemy withdrew. The Kuomintang was well aware that those were false victories. It was later discovered that the Japanese forces stationed in Nanning were less than a tenth the size of their opponent, but was able to hold their own due to excellent defensive fortifications and communications equipment.

== Chinese casualties ==
The "History of the Anti-Japanese War" recorded the losses of the Chinese Army as 24,158 killed, 30,562 wounded, and 9,569 missing. However, it was noted in the statistical table of casualties that the casualties of the New 33rd Division, Longzhou Teaching Corps (two regiments strong), the four independent regiments under the command of Cai Tingkai, and the headquarters of the 31st Corps in the whole campaign, the 175th Division before the fall of Kunlun Pass, the 46th Corps (excluding the 170th division) and 64th Corps (excluding the 156th division) in the battle of Binyang, and 6,416 additional unspecified killed, wounded, or missing from the 5th Corps were not included in the above statistics. The 66th and 99th Corps were recorded as suffering 4,343 killed, 5,092 wounded, and 909 missing from the whole campaign. However, according to the same source, the two corps (excluding the 118th Division and 160th Division) suffered 5,079 killed, over 6,200 wounded, and over 560 missing in the battle of Kunlun Pass alone. The two corps then went on to participate in the battle of Binyang. The "History of the Anti-Japanese War" recorded the losses of the 2nd Corps as 1,862 killed, 1,497 wounded, and 558 missing. Zhang Fakui reported on February 23 that based on 2nd Corps commander Li Yannian's report, the units directly under the 2nd Corps' headquarters suffered 885 killed, 102 wounded, and 103 missing, the 49th Division suffered 84 officers and 4,520 soldiers casualties, the 76th Division suffered 3,095 killed, 790 wounded, and 756 missing, and the 9th Division suffered 185 killed, 236 wounded, and 673 missing.

According to divisional commander Wang Yan, the 118th Division under the 99th Corps suffered 1,048 killed and 1,304 wounded in the battle of Southern Guangxi. The 5th Corps suffered 32 officers and approximately 1,300 soldiers casualties from January 12 to February 10 which were not included in the statistics of casualties recorded by the "History of the Anti-Japanese War". In the battles of Liutang and Qitang from February 23 to February 25, 1940, the New 33rd Division suffered more than 3,000 casualties.

In the Lingshan breakout in March 1940, the 46th Corps suffered 297 killed or wounded and 931 missing. The 64th Corps also suffered heavy casualties at Lingshan, with the 155th Division losing approximately half of its troops and the 156th Division losing approximately one-third of its troops. A later report recorded the losses of the 155th Division at 13 officers killed and 10 officers wounded with 237 rifles lost and no reported soldiers casualties. The 156th Division suffered 3 officers and 316 soldiers killed, 5 officers and 52 soldiers wounded, and 3 officers and 32 soldiers missing with 7 rifles lost. The Southern Route 1st Guerilla Command also suffered heavy casualties in the battle of Lingshan in mid-March 1940. The 131st Division of the 31st Corps was surrounded between Suilu and Sile from late March to early April 1940 and suffered considerable casualties. By then, its strength had been reduced to one-third.

Japanese forces advanced from the Yong-Long highway in early June, engaging with elements of the 135th and 188th Divisions of the 31st Corps. In this action, the 135th Division lost two-thirds of two of its battalions and the 188th Division suffered more than 200 casualties. From June 17 to July 4, 1940, excluding the regiment of the 135th Division garrisoned at Shangsi, the 131st and 135th Divisions of the 31st Corps suffered 116 killed, 116 wounded, and 268 missing in the Longzhou Operation. The 403rd Regiment of the 135th Division defending Shangsi bore the brunt of the attack during the Longzhou Operation and lost two-thirds of its troops. In the Fourth War Zone's offensive at Guangxi in October 1940, the Chinese Army suffered over a thousand casualties.

In the Jiangnan Operation from March 1 to April 7, 1940, the Guards Mixed Brigade was reported to have engaged with 11,960 Chinese troops and claimed 2,042 abandoned enemy corpses and 35 POWs and the 9th Infantry Brigade was reported to have engaged with approximately 11,000 Chinese troops and claimed 1,336 abandoned enemy corpses and 114 POWs. In the "Second Operation on the West Road" from May 27 to June 17, 1940, the Guards Mixed Brigade was reported to have engaged with 5,170 Chinese troops and claimed 1,049 abandoned enemy corpses and 14 POWs. In the battle at the border of French Indochina from June 17 to July 22, 1940, the Guards Mixed Brigade claimed approximately 200 abandoned enemy corpses from the 403rd Regiment of the 135th Division in Shangsi County along with the 188th, 175th, and 170th Divisions. In the Qinning evacuation operation from September 30 to October 27, 1940, the Guards Mixed Brigade claimed to have killed 1,329 Chinese troops and captured 12.

== See also ==
- Air Warfare of WWII from the Sino-Japanese War perspective

== Sources ==
- Hsu Long-hsuen, Chang Ming-kai (1972). History of The Sino-Japanese War (1937–1945). Translated by Wen Ha-hsiung (2nd ed.). Taipei, Taiwan Republic of China: Chung Wu Publishing. pp. 311–318, 325–327, map 18.
  - Map 18
- Perry–Castañeda Library Map Collection, China 1:250,000, Series L500, U.S. Army Map Service, 1954- . Topographic Maps of China during the Second World War.
  - These two maps cover the area where most of the fighting went on in the Guangxi campaign:
  - Lai-Pin nf49-1, has the Kunlun Pass just above where the road from Nanning enters the map:
  - Nanning nf49-5
