= Imperial Guard (Japan) =

Japanese protection force for the Emperor and Imperial Family

The Imperial Guard of Japan has been two separate organizations dedicated to the protection of the Emperor of Japan and the Imperial Family, palaces and other imperial properties. The first was the Imperial guard divisions (Konoe Shidan), a quasi-independent elite branch of the Imperial Japanese Army, which was dissolved shortly after World War II. The current organization is the Imperial Guard Headquarters (Kouguu-Keisatsu Hombu; lit. Imperial Palace Police Headquarters), a civilian law enforcement organization that is part of the National Police Agency.

== Imperial Guard of the Imperial Japanese Army ==
Imperial Guard
- 近衛師団
- Active: 1867–1945
- Disbanded: 1945
- Country: Empire of Japan
- Type: Imperial guard
- Size: 3 Divisions; 10 Regiments
- Garrison/HQ: Tokyo
- Engagements: Satsuma Rebellion; Sino-Japanese War; Russo-Japanese War; World War I World War II

Commanders
- Notable commanders: Yamagata Aritomo, Ōyama Iwao, Prince Kan'in Kotohito, Hajime Sugiyama, Hideki Tojo, Yasuji Okamura, Shunroku Hata, Tadamichi Kuribayashi, Tomoyuki Yamashita, Masaharu Homma

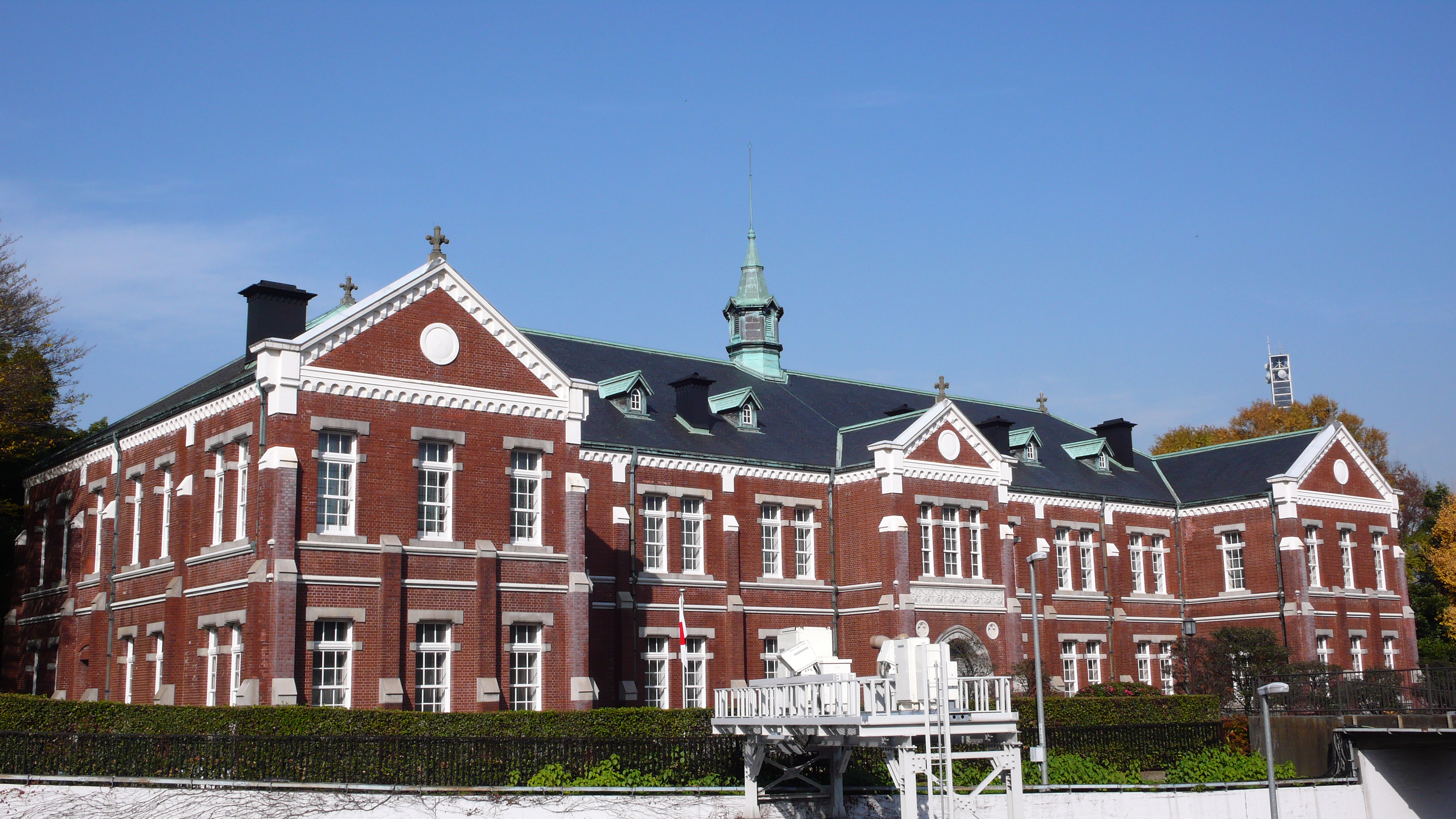
Former Imperial Guard Headquarters, now the National Museum of Modern Art Crafts Gallery.

The Imperial Guard of the Imperial Japanese Army was formed in 1867. It became the foundation of the Imperial Japanese Army after the Emperor Meiji assumed all the powers of state during the Meiji Restoration. The Imperial Guard, which consisted of 12,000 men organized and trained along French military lines, first saw action in the Satsuma Rebellion. It was organized into the 1st Guards Infantry Brigade, which had the 1st and 2nd Regiments. The 3rd and 4th Regiments belonged to the 2nd Guards Infantry Brigade.

By 1885 the Imperial Japanese Army consisted of seven divisions, one of which was the Imperial Guard. A division consisted of four regiments containing an HQ and two battalions each. The Imperial Guard division was based in Tokyo and was recruited on national lines; officers were also drawn nationally.

After the Russo-Japanese War in 1905, a second Guard Brigade was formed from indigenous Formosans. In 1920 the Guards Cavalry Regiment, Guards Field Artillery Regiment, Guards Engineer Battalion, and Guards Transport Battalion, plus other Guards service units were raised, adding to the overall order of battle of the force. From 1937 to 1939 the Guards Engineer Battalion was expanded into a regiment as was the Guards Transport Battalion.

=== Pacific War ===
In September 1939, the division was split into the 1st and 2nd Guards Brigades.

The 1st Guards Brigade, which contained the 1st and 2nd Guards Infantry Regiments, the cavalry regiment, and half of the support units, was transferred to South China. Here it became known as the Mixed Guards Brigade. In October 1940, it joined other Japanese units occupying French Indo-China. In April 1941 the Mixed Guards Brigade returned to Tokyo but it did not rejoin the Imperial Guards Division.

The 2nd Guards Brigade, which contained 3rd and 4th Guards Regiments, also went to China. In 1940, it went to Shanghai before being posted to Hainan Island. In June 1941, the 5th Guards Infantry Regiment joined the 2nd Guards Brigade becoming the Imperial Guard Division again. It later saw action in the Battles of Malaya and Singapore with Tomoyuki Yamashita's 25th Army.

In May 1943, all designated Imperial Guard units were renamed again. The Mixed Guards Brigade in Tokyo became the 1st Guards Division (which now consisted of the 1st, 2nd, 6th Guard Regiments) and the Imperial Guard Division became the 2nd Guards Division. The 3rd Guards Division, which never left Japan, was formed in 1944. It consisted of the 8th, 9th and 10th Guards Regiments. Sources do not agree if there ever was a 7th Guard Regiment.

All military Imperial Guard Divisions were dissolved at the end of World War II.

=== War crimes ===
In Japanese-occupied Malaya and Singapore, the Guard Division was involved in several notorious war crimes such as the Parit Sulong Massacre and the Sook Ching massacre. Lt Gen. Takuma Nishimura, who was sentenced to life imprisonment by a British military court in relation to the Sook Ching killings, was later convicted of war crimes by an Australian Military Court in relation to the Parit Sulong massacre. He was executed by hanging on June 11, 1951.

=== Organization ===
- 1st Guards Division (近衛第1師団, Konoe Dai-ichi Shidan)
- 2nd Guards Division (近衛第2師団, Konoe Dai-ni Shidan)
- 3rd Guards Division (近衛第3師団, Konoe Dai-san Shidan)

=== Uniform ===
Until 1939, the Cavalry of the Imperial Guard wore a French-style parade uniform consisting of a dark-blue tunic with red Brandenburg braiding, a red kepi and red breeches. The red kepi had a white plume with a red base. Prior to the general adoption of khaki by the Japanese Army during the Russo-Japanese War (1904–1905), an all-white linen uniform had been worn in hot weather.

The Infantry of the Imperial Guard wore a dark blue uniform with white leggings for both parade and service wear until 1905. It was distinguished from that of the line infantry by a red band and piping on the peaked service cap (instead of yellow). Officers wore a dark blue tunic with 5 rows of black mohair froggings and dark blue breeches with a red stripe down each seam.

Following the adoption of a khaki service dress, the Guard Infantry wore this on all occasions, although officers retained the blue and red uniform for certain ceremonial occasions when not parading with troops.

In the field, the army's standard khaki uniform was worn by all Imperial Guard units from 1905 to 1945. Guard units were distinguished by a wreathed star in bronze worn on the headgear, in contrast to the plain five pointed star worn by other units.

=== Gallery ===
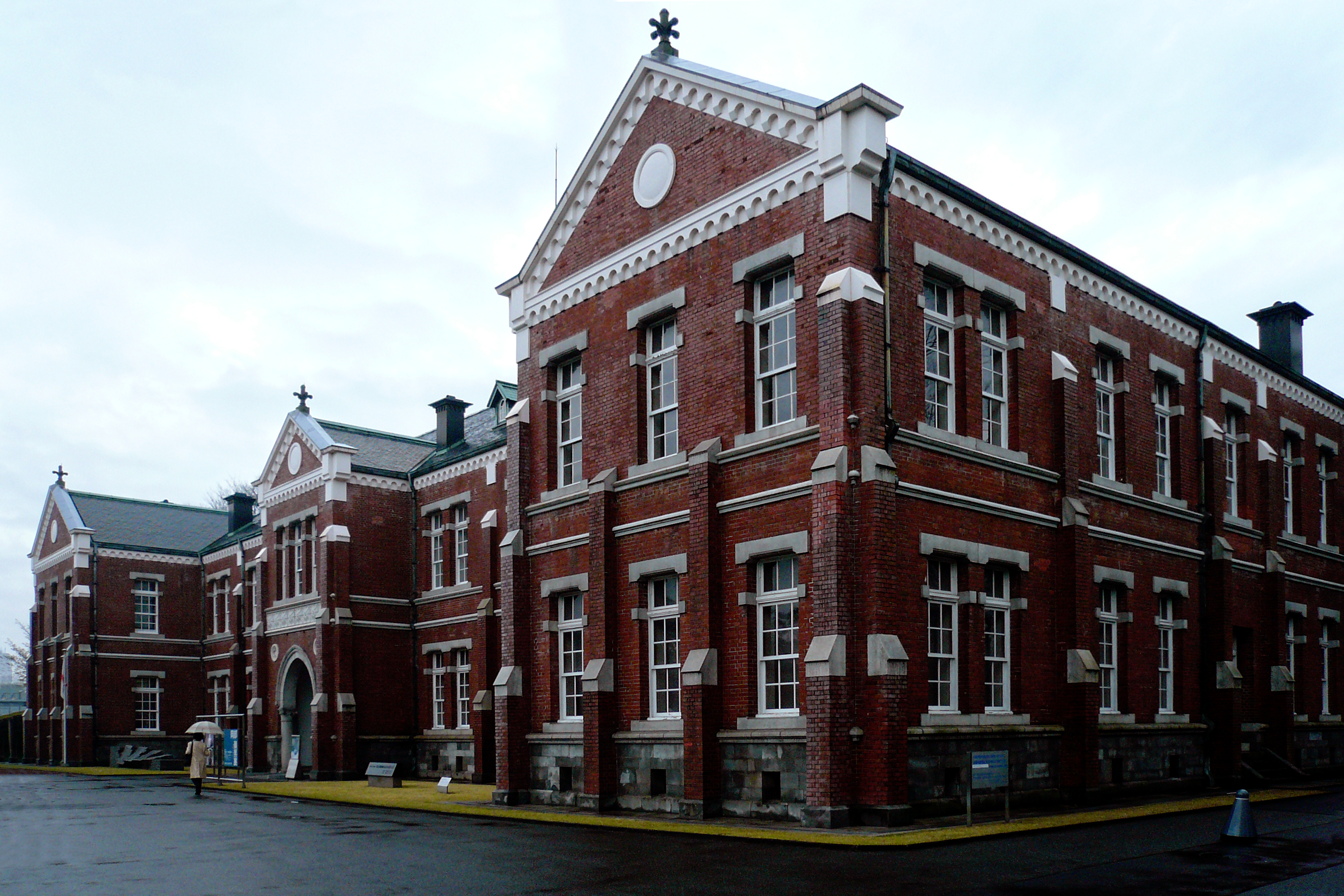
Original headquarters of the Japanese Imperial Guard, now part of the National Museum of Modern Art, Tokyo

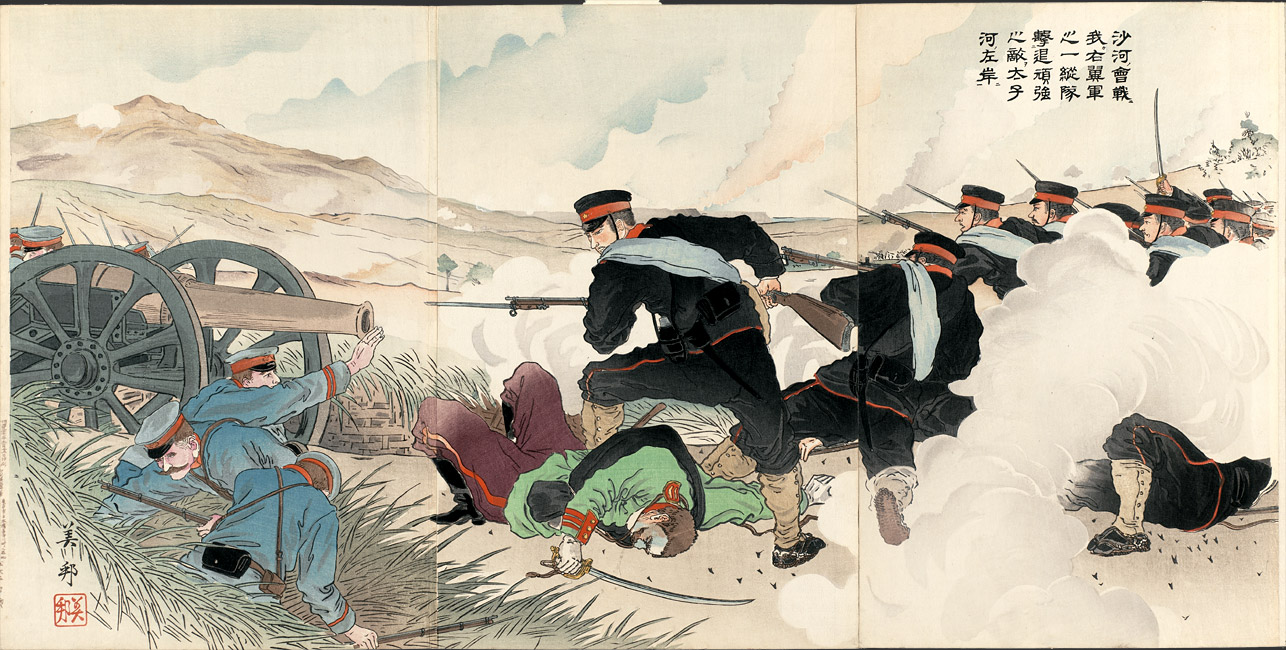
An ukiyo-e print of the Imperial Guard driving back Russian infantry at the Battle of Shaho during the Russo-Japanese War in 1904

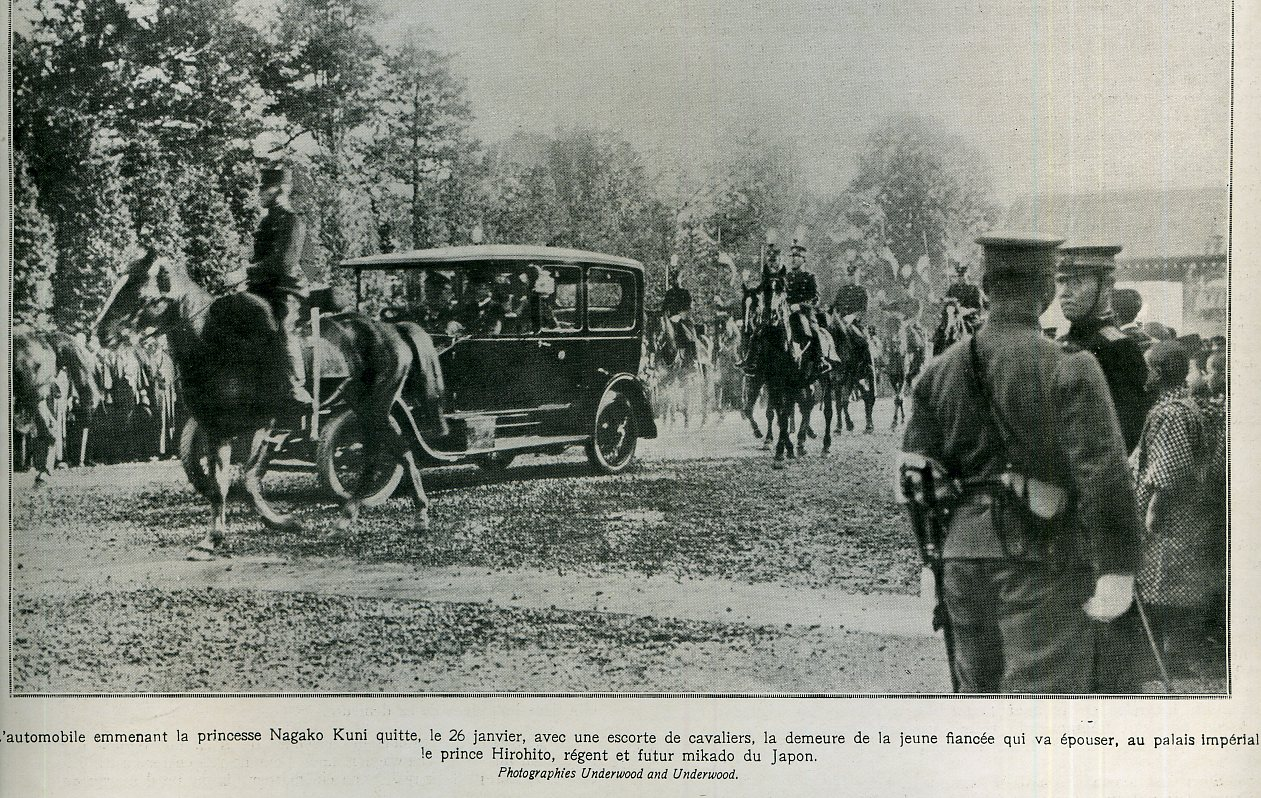
Mounted Imperial Guards wearing the dark blue dress uniform at Emperor Hirohito's wedding in 1924

== Imperial Guard Headquarters ==
Imperial Guard Headquarters Kōgū-Keisatsu Honbu 皇宮警察本部
- 5–3 paulownia crest
- Abbreviation: IGH

Agency overview
- Formed: January 1, 1947 (as the Imperial Guard Bureau of the TMPD)
- Preceding agency: Imperial Police (皇宮警察, Kōgū-Keisatsu)
- Employees: 936 people (896 of them are palace guards)
- Annual budget: 8,366,559 thousand yen per year (FY 2018)

Jurisdictional structure
- Operations jurisdiction: Japan
- Specialist jurisdiction: Protection of international or domestic VIPs, protection of significant state assets

Operational structure
- Overseen by: National Police Agency
- Headquarters: Tokyo
- Agency executives: Masato Ushijima, Director (Imperial Palace supervision); Nobuhiro Kato, Deputy Director General (Imperial Palace Supervision)
- Units: List: Security department, escort department, police department

After the disbandment of the Imperial Guard divisions, their missions were merged into the Imperial Police (皇宮警察, Kōgū-Keisatsu), a civilian law enforcement branch of the Ministry of the Imperial Household. In 1947, it was reorganized into the Imperial Guard Bureau (皇宮警察部, Kōgū-Keisatsu-bu) of the Tokyo Metropolitan Police Department, and then transferred to the National Rural Police (国家地方警察, Kokka Chihō Keisatsu Honbu). After being renamed several times, it became the Imperial Guard Headquarters (皇宮警察本部, Kōgū-Keisatsu Honbu) in 1949. With the total reconstruction of the Japanese police systems in 1954, it became a part of the National Police Agency.

At present, it consists of over 900 security police personnel who provide personal security for the Emperor, Crown Prince and other members of the Imperial Family, as well as protection of imperial properties, including the Tokyo Imperial Palace, Kyoto Imperial Palace, Katsura Imperial Villa, Shugakuin Imperial Villa (both in Kyoto), Shosoin Imperial Repository in Nara, as well as Hayama Imperial Villa and Nasu Imperial Villa.

The Imperial Guard maintains a 14-horse mounted police unit for use by guards of honour at state ceremonies. In addition to their security duties, the Imperial Guard is responsible for fire-fighting within the grounds of the Palace, and maintains fire engines and trained staff for this.

The NPA Imperial Guards wear a dark blue or a blue-grey police uniform with white gloves while on duty with peaked caps for public duties activities. They also wear white pistol belts, lanyards, helmets, boot laces or leggings. They carry police rank insignia in their shoulder boards.

The Imperial Guard stepped up their efforts to protect the Imperial Family after the assassination of Shinzo Abe in 2022.

=== Overview ===
The Imperial Guard Police is responsible for ensuring the safety of Emperor Naruhito, Empress Masako, Emperor Emeritus Akihito, Empress Emerita Michiko, and all members of the Imperial Family. The guards provide close personal protection, escorting, and protection, not only at the Imperial Palace and its residences, but also during the royal members travel both within Japan and overseas.

In addition, to ensure the security of the Imperial Palace, the Akasaka Estate, various imperial villas, the Kyoto Imperial Palace, the Shōsōin Repository, and other facilities, security and guard operations are conducted mainly in the following one metropolis, one prefecture-level city, and four prefectures including:

- Tokyo
  - Tokyo Imperial Palace
  - Akasaka Estate
  - Tokiwamatsu Imperial Villa
  - Takanawa Imperial Residence
- Tochigi Prefecture
  - Nasu Imperial Villa
  - Imperial Ranch
- Kanagawa Prefecture
  - Hayama Imperial Villa
- Shizuoka Prefecture
  - Suzaki Imperial Villa
- Kyoto Prefecture
  - Kyoto Imperial Palace
  - Ōmiya Palace
  - Sento Imperial Palace
  - Katsura Imperial Villa
  - Shugakuin Imperial Villa
- Nara Prefecture
  - Shōsōin Repository

When foreign dignitaries visit Japan as state guests and enter the Imperial Palace, or when ambassadors enter the Imperial Palace for the presentation of credentials, the Imperial Guard Police provides escort duties. These escorts may include mounted units and large motorcycles with sidecars.

A unique feature of the Imperial Guard Police is that it is the only police force in Japan that also performs firefighting duties, carrying out both fire suppression in the event of an emergency and preventive measures to ensure fires do not occur. As a result, it operates fire engines known as "keibō-sha" (firefighting and disaster-response vehicles), which feature white bodies with red stripes. These vehicles are deployed at guard stations such as Sakashita, Fukiage, Akasaka, and Kyoto.

The organization also includes, The Imperial Guard Academy, which provides the necessary education and training for Imperial Guard officers, the Imperial Guard Police Band, and the Imperial Guard Police Special Security Unit.

In the fiscal year of 2009, the position of Director of the Administration Department was abolished, and the post of Deputy Director-General was established.

The authorized personnel strength of the Imperial Guard Police Headquarters is defined by the Regulations on the Authorized Strength of the National Police Agency. As of April 1, 2020, the organization consisted of 972 personnel, comprising 932 Imperial Guard officers and 40 administrative officers and other staff.

In 2021, the Imperial Guard Police appointed its first female Senior Superintendent.

Each year in late January, the Imperial Guard Police holds a New Year Ceremony at the East Gardens of the Imperial Palace. The ceremony typically involves approximately 11 units and around 260 personnel, including motorcycle units and mounted units. The ceremony was canceled in 2021, and 2022, due to the COVID-19 pandemic. On January 20, 2023, it was held for the first time in three years. This occasion marked the first time since the establishment of the Imperial Guard Police that both the Emperor and Empress attended the ceremony, since Emperor Naruhito last attendance in 1986.

=== History ===
In January 1947, the Imperial Guard Police was transferred from the Imperial Household Ministry to the Home Ministry and was renamed the Imperial Guard Police Department of the Tokyo Metropolitan Police Department. At this time, the official title of personnel was changed from “Imperial Guard Police Officer” to “Imperial Guard Officer”, and close-protection duties (側近護衛) were transferred to the Board of Chamberlains.

In March 1948, with the enforcement of the former Police Law, the organization was transferred to the National Rural Police Headquarters and was designated as the Imperial Guard Police Office (皇宮警察府, Kōgū Keisatsufu). At this point, responsibility for close-protection duties (側近護衛) was again assumed. In June of the same year, the organization was renamed the Imperial Guard Police Bureau (皇宮警察局, Kōgū Keisatsukyoku).

In December 1948, Imperial Guard officers (皇宮護衛官) were designated as Special Judicial Police Officers giving them the authority to conduct criminal investigations. In January 1949, the organization became the Imperial Guard Police Headquarters, an external bureau of the National Rural Police Headquarters.

In August 1951, the duty system of the Imperial Guard Police was changed to a work schedule of a three-shift duty system. In December 1952, the Imperial Guard Police Band was established. In June 1953, the Imperial Guard Police School was established.

In July 1954, with the enforcement of the current Police Law, the organization became the Imperial Guard Police Headquarters as an affiliated agency of the National Police Agency.

In June 1960, the position of Jiei-kan (侍衛官; commander responsible for directing side-guard / close-protection operations) was established, and the Tokiwamatsu Guard Station was abolished.

In April 1973, a Security Department (護衛部) was established within the Imperial Guard Police Headquarters.

In December 1977, permanent protection was extended to Imperial Family members other than those of the Inner Court.

In August 1992, the duty system of the Imperial Guard Police was changed to a four-shift duty system.

On April 26, 2011, in the Aftermath of the 2011 Tōhoku earthquake and tsunami, which resulted from the Tōhoku earthquake, that occurred on March 11 of the same year, a patrol unit named the “Imperial Guard Police Himawari Unit” (皇宮警察ひまわり隊; “Himawari” meaning “Sunflower”) was organized and dispatched to disaster-affected areas of the Tōhoku region. This marked the first instance of activity conducted outside the jurisdiction of the Imperial Guard Police in its history.

=== Organization ===
The organization of the Imperial Guard Police Headquarters consists of 2 departments and 10 divisions, 4 Guard Stations, and the Imperial Guard Academy. The duties of the Imperial Guard Police Headquarters are organized into three main divisions: the Protection Division, the Security Division, and the Police Administration Division.

- Imperial Guard Police Superintendent General)
- Imperial Guard Police Senior Superintendent)
- Chief Inspector
  - Police Affairs Division (personnel, salaries, public relations, Imperial Guard Police Band)
  - Inspection Division (planning, inspection, information management)
  - Accounting Division (budget, facilities, repairs)
  - Education and Welfare Division (general education, arts training, welfare, mutual aid matters)
  - Mounted Protection Unit
- Security Department
  - 1s Security Division (security planning, investigations)
    - (Permanent) Special Security Unit
  - 2nd Security Division (quick reaction force, disaster prevention and relief, communications, estate security)
- Protection Department
  - First Protection Division (protection of Their Majesties the Emperor and Empress; protection of state guests)
  - Second Protection Division (protection of Their Imperial Highnesses the Crown Prince and Crown Princess, protection of other members of the Imperial Family)
  - Emperor Emeritus Protection Division (protection of Their Majesties the Emperor Emeritus and Empress Emerita)
- Sakashita Guard Station
  - Sakashita Gate Security Police Substation
  - Tomedame Security Police Substation
  - Yagurashita Security Police Substation
  - Tōnosaka Security Police Substation
  - Kitsunezaka Security Police Substation
- Fukiage Guard Station
  - Sotoniwa East Gate Security Police Substation
  - Inui Gate Security Police Substation
- Akasaka Guard Station
  - Akasaka Imperial Residence Main Gate Security Police Substation
  - Samega-mon Security Police Substation
  - South Gate Security Police Substation
- Kyoto Guard Station
  - Kenrei Gate Security Police Substation
  - North Gate Security Substation
  - Shugakuin Imperial Villa Imperial Guard Police Substation
  - Katsura Imperial Villa Imperial Guard Police Substation
  - Shōsōin Imperial Guard Police Substation
- Imperial Guard Academy

=== Duties ===
- Protection Division

The Protection Division is responsible for ensuring the personal safety of members of the Imperial Household, including the Emperor and Empress, the Emperor Emeritus and Empress Emerita, and other members of the Imperial Family. Protection is provided not only while they are at the Imperial Palace or other imperial residences, but also during outings, attendance at ceremonies, and participation in various official events.

Imperial guard officers require not only advanced security capabilities, but also a wide range of abilities such as horse riding, skiing, tennis, martial arts, archery, kendo, and the ability to communicate in foreign languages. These skills are developed through ongoing education, training, and drills. During visits by foreign heads of state or ambassadors to the Imperial Palace, protection is provided using mounted units and sidecars.

- Security Division

The Security Division and the Guard Stations are responsible for the security of the Imperial Palace, the Akasaka Estate, the Kyoto Imperial Palace, the Ōmiya and Sento Imperial Palaces, the Katsura and Shugakuin Imperial Villas, the Shōsōin Repository, imperial villas, and other related facilities. Their duties include planning and implementing security for events such as the Emperor’s Birthday and New Year general public audiences and garden parties, as well as deploying and maintaining security equipment and materials.

- Police Administration Division

The Police Administration Division supports the operations of the Imperial Guard Police by managing duty schedules, recruitment, personnel administration, education, budgeting, and welfare, ensuring that the organization operates efficiently and effectively. Its staff coordinate the organization as a whole while also working to create a safe and practical environment for frontline officers.

Within the division, the Imperial Guard Police Band is responsible for performing at Imperial events such as garden parties, as well as at national police music concerts and lunchtime concerts in the East Gardens of the Imperial Palace, contributing to the public-relations activities of the Imperial Guard Police.

- Special Security Unit

The Special Security Unit, attached to the First Security Division, primarily handles ceremonial guard duties at the Imperial Palace main gate, during the entry of state guests, and at other official events. It is also responsible for rapid deployment in response to emergencies like security incidents, and possesses capabilities to respond to incidents involving firearms or other weapons. The unit serves as the core response team for incidents within the Imperial Palace and related facilities. From 2022, the unit’s capabilities were further strengthened by selecting personnel with specialized skills in explosives, firearms countermeasures, and counter-terrorism against weapons of mass destruction (NBC), enhancing both the structure and operational functions of the unit.

=== Gallery ===
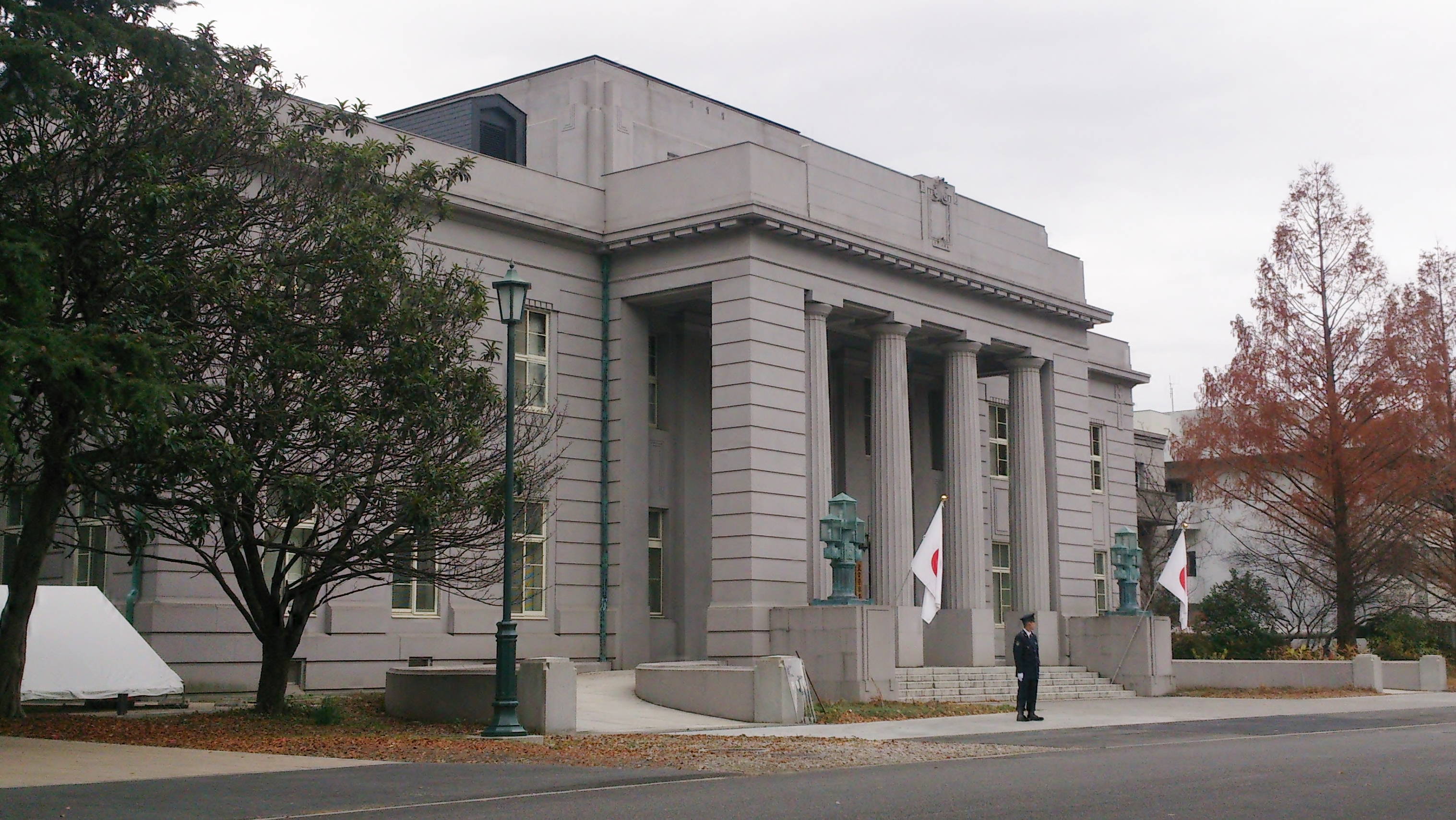
Imperial Guard Headquarters building, Tokyo

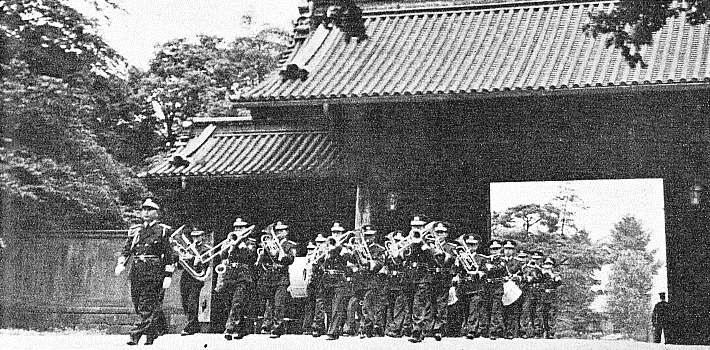
An Imperial Guard Music Band marching through Tokyo in the 1950s

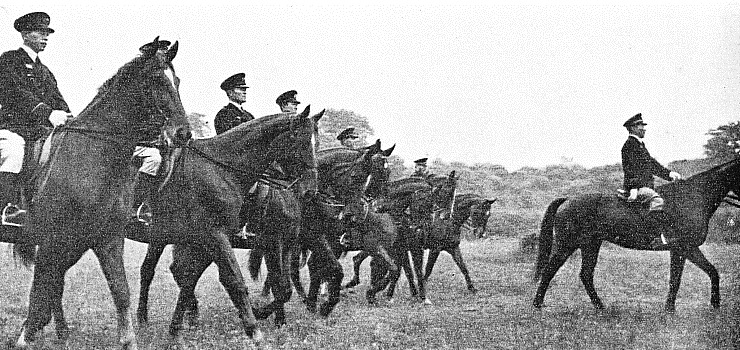
Mounted Imperial Guard police officers in the 1950s

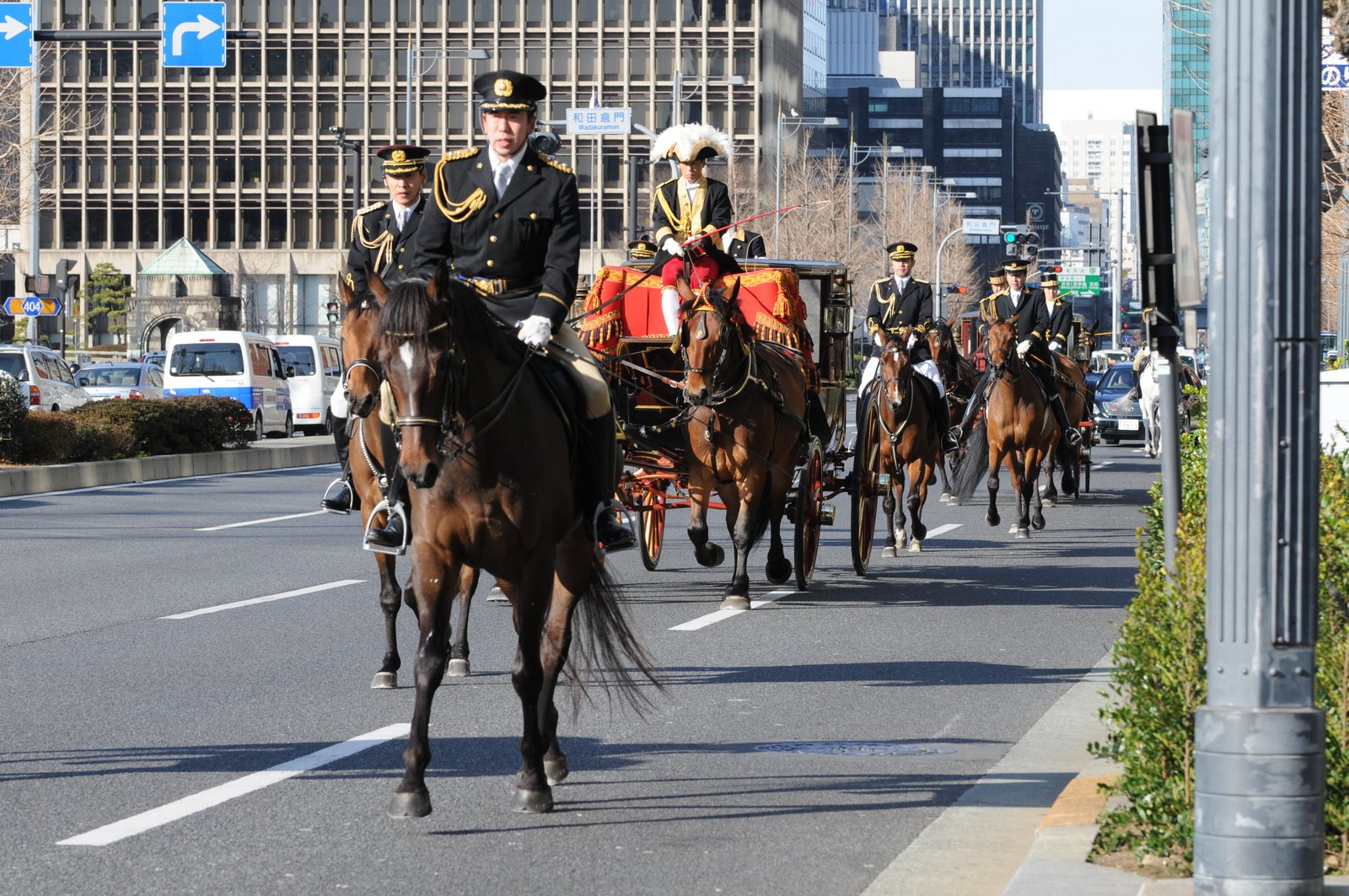
Mounted Imperial Guards during a presentation of credentials ceremony

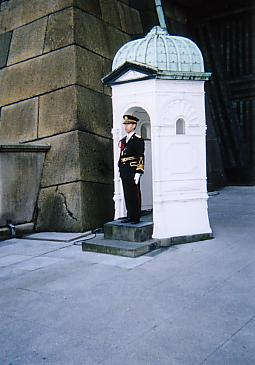
An Imperial Guard sentry at the Seimon Ishibashi bridge outside the Imperial Palace, Tokyo

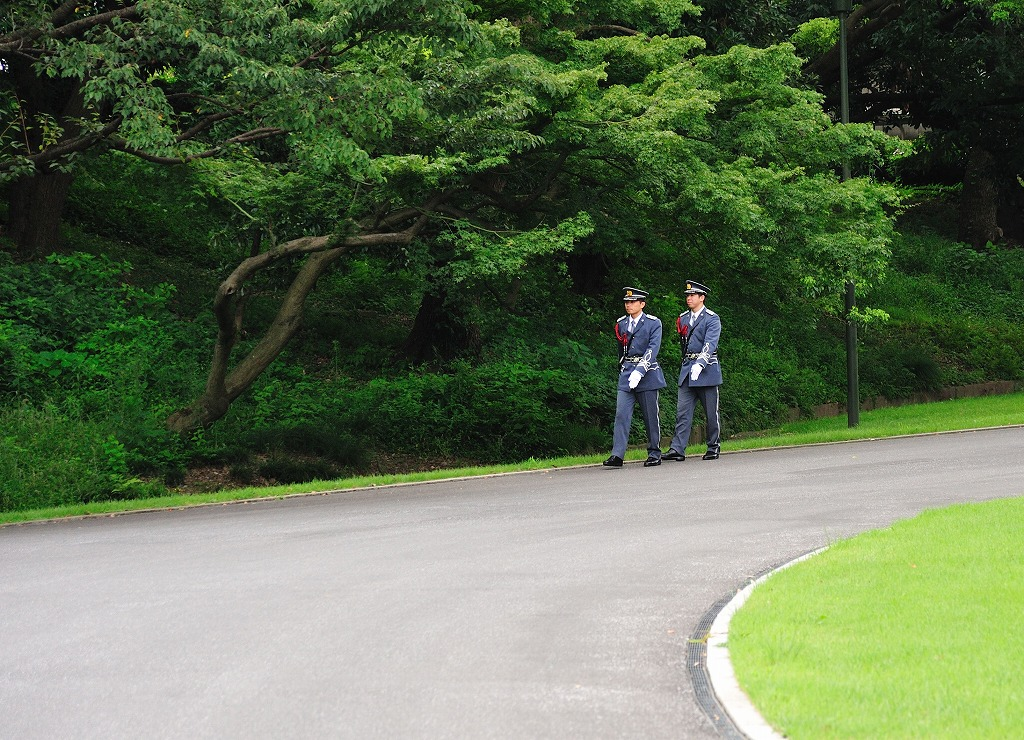
Modern Imperial Guards at the Imperial Palace, Tokyo

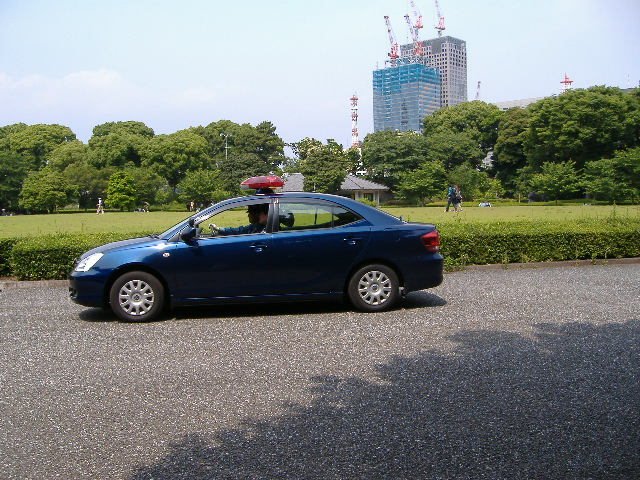
Imperial Guards in a patrol car within the gardens of the Imperial Palace, Tokyo

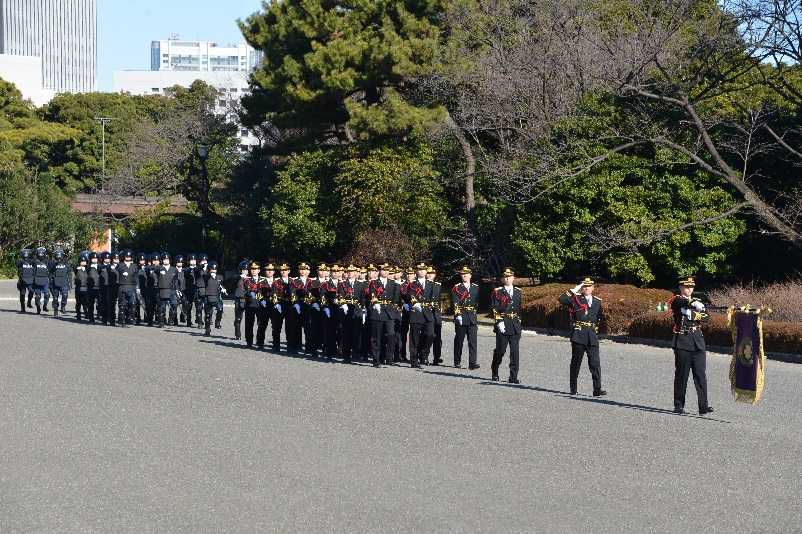
Special Security Unit (特別警備隊, Tokubetsu keibi tai) of the Imperial Guard Headquarters

== See also ==
- Manchukuo Imperial Guards
- List of army units called "guards"
- Akazonae
