= 1st Guards Division (Imperial Japanese Army) =

- 近衛第1師団
- Active: 1943-1945
- Disbanded: 1945
- Country: Empire of Japan
- Branch: Imperial Japanese Army
- Size: Division
- Garrison/HQ: Tokyo, Japan
- Engagements: World War II

The Imperial Japanese Army's 1st Guards Division (近衛第1師団, Konoe Dai-ichi Shidan) was formed from the Guards Mixed Brigade in June 1943 and a new Guards Regiment, the 6th, was added, with the 1st Guards Cavalry Regiment, 1st Guards Field Artillery Regiment, 1st Guards Engineer Regiment and 1st Guards Transport Regiment, and other support units.

Based in Tokyo, Japan until the end of World War II.

== See also ==
- Imperial Guard (Japan)
