= Mixed Brigades (Imperial Japanese Army) =

IJA Mixed Brigades
- Active: 1937–1945
- Country: Empire of Japan
- Branch: Japanese Imperial Army
- Type: Brigade
- Role: Garrisoning occupied territories
- Part of: IJA divisions
- Engagements: Second Sino-Japanese War; World War II

The Mixed Brigade was one of the military units of the Imperial Japanese Army. The IJA had two types of Mixed Brigades.

== Mixed Brigades ==
The first type was known as Mixed Brigade. This was the detachment of an infantry brigade from an IJA Infantry Division with various Divisional support units or sometimes units attached from its Corps or Army. This provided a combined arms force of infantry, artillery, cavalry and other support units.

== Independent Mixed Brigades ==
The second type was the Independent Mixed Brigade. These were detachments made of various units detached from other units or independent support units formed together in a brigade.

The first two of these Independent Mixed Brigades, formed by the Kwantung Army in the 1930s was the IJA 1st Independent Mixed Brigade and the IJA 11th Independent Mixed Brigade. These brigades were organized in unique manners and one of them, the 11th, was later formed into the IJA 26th Division.

Later a series of IJA Independent Mixed Brigades were formed for the purpose of garrisoning the large territories of China captured in the early phase of the Second Sino-Japanese War.

== See also ==
- List of Japanese Infantry divisions
