= Swatow Operation order of battle =

The following units and commanders fought in the Swatow Operation, June 21–27, 1939, of the Second Sino-Japanese War.

== Japan ==
=== Imperial Japanese Army ===
21st Army Commander: Lieutenant General Rikichi Ando

- Goto Task Force Commander: Major General Juro Goto
  - Goto Task Force:
    - 132nd Infantry Brigade
      - 137th Infantry Regiment: Colonel Takashi Mori
      - 161st Infantry Regiment (excluding 1st Battalion): Colonel Tadao Inui
      - Independent 10th Mountain Gun Regiment (excluding 3rd Battalion)
  - Attached Units:
    - Independent 70th Infantry Battalion: Major Jitaro Oda
    - 1 Tankette Platoon, Independent 11th Tankette Company
    - 1 Radio Platoon
    - 1 Railway Platoon, 2nd Railway Regiment
    - Rivercrossing Material Company, 6th and 21st Divisions
    - Military Police Detachment, 21st Army
  - Landing Work Force:
    - 1 Engineer Company, Independent 10th Engineer Regiment
    - Independent 14th Engineer Regiment (excluding 1 Company)
    - Roadstead Command Headquarters
    - 8th Division 12th Land Transport Unit (excluding two squads)
    - 1 Maritime Transport Squad, 11th and 21st Divisions
    - Detachment, Ship Communications Unit

=== Imperial Japanese Navy ===
5th Fleet Commander: Vice Admiral Kondo Nobutake

- Surface Units:
  - 9th Squadron
  - 5th Torpedo Squadron
  - 12th Minesweeper Unit
  - 21st Minesweeper Unit
  - 45th Destroyer Division
- Air Units:
  - 3rd Combined Naval Air Group
    - 24 land-based bombers
    - 9 reconnaissance seaplanes
  - Seaplane Tender Chiyoda
  - 9 reconnaissance seaplanes
  - Canton Aircraft Unit
    - 1 flying boat
    - 1 reconnaissance seaplane
- Land Units:
  - Sasebo 9th Special Naval Landing Force: Commander Hisayuki Soeda
- Other auxiliary vessels

Notes:

- Goto Task Force was built around the 132nd Infantry Brigade detached from 104th Division from 21st Army in Canton, in South China.
- 5th Fleet Naval force strength: *[1]
  - 40+ ships
  - 10+ motorboats

== China ==
Local defenders:

- #? Brigade - Hua Chen-chung
- Local Militia - ?
- 2nd Peace Preservation Regiment
- 4th Peace Preservation Regiment
- 5th Peace Preservation Regiment
- Training Regiment

Later reinforcements:

- 5th Reserve Division - ?
- 1st Advance Column - ?
