= Guangdong Operation order of battle =

Below is the order of battle for the Canton Operation, October to December 1938 during the Second Sino-Japanese War.

== Imperial Japanese Army ==
21st Army - Lt. Gen. Motoo Furusho [8]

- 5th Division - Lt. Gen. Rikichi Ando [8]
  - 9th Infantry Brigade
    - 11th Infantry Regiment
    - 41st Infantry Regiment
  - 21st Infantry Brigade
    - 21st Infantry Regiment
    - 42nd Infantry Regiment
  - 5th Field Artillery Regiment
  - 5th Cavalry Regiment
  - 5th Engineer Regiment
  - 5th Transport Regiment
- 18th Division - Lt. Gen. Seiichi Kunou [8]
  - 23rd Infantry Brigade
    - 55th Infantry Regiment
    - 56th Infantry Regiment
  - 35th Infantry Brigade
    - 114th Infantry Regiment
    - 124th Infantry Regiment
  - 22nd Cavalry Battalion
  - 18th Mountain Artillery Regiment
  - 12th Military Engineer Regiment
  - 12th Transport Regiment
- 104th Division - Lt. Gen. Toshio Miyake [8]
  - 107th Infantry Brigade
    - 108th Infantry Regiment
    - 170th Infantry Regiment
  - 132nd Infantry Brigade
    - 137th Infantry Regiment
    - 161st Infantry Regiment
  - 104th Field Artillery Regiment
  - 104th Cavalry Regiment
  - 104th Engineer Regiment
  - 104th Transport Regiment

Forces directly under 21st Army:

- 3rd Independent Machinegun Battalion (独立機関銃第三大隊)
- 6th Independent Machinegun Battalion (独立機関銃第六大隊)
- 21st Independent Machinegun Battalion (独立機関銃第二十一大隊)
- 11th Independent Light Armored Car Company (独立軽装甲車第十一中隊)
- 51st Independent Light Armored Car Company (独立軽装甲車第五十一中隊)
- 52nd Independent Light Armored Car Company (独立軽装甲車第五十二中隊)
- 111th Mountain Artillery Regiment (山砲兵第百十一聯隊)
- 10th Independent Mountain Artillery Regiment (独立山砲兵第十聯隊)
- 1st Heavy Field Artillery Brigade (野戦重砲兵第一旅団)
- 2nd Mortar Battalion (迫撃第二大隊)
- 21st Mortar Battalion (迫撃第二十一大隊)
- 11th Independent Heavy Siege Artillery Battalion (独立攻城重砲兵第十一大隊)
- 1st Independent Heavy Mortar Battalion (独立臼砲第一大隊)
- 2nd Independent Heavy Mortar Battalion (独立臼砲第二大隊)
- 3rd Division's 6th and 7th Field Anti-Aircraft Batteries (第三師団第六、第七野戦高射砲隊)
- 3rd Division's 8th and 9th Field Anti-Aircraft Batteries (第三師団第八、第九野戦高射砲隊)
- 1st Division's 6th and 8th Field Anti-Aircraft Batteries (第一師団第六、第八野戦高射砲隊)
- 5th Division's 2nd Field Anti-Aircraft Battery (第五師団第二野戦高射砲隊)
- 20th Division's 2nd Field Anti-Aircraft Battery (第二十師団第二野戦高射砲隊)
- 1st Independent Balloon Company (独立気球第一中隊)
- 15th Independent Engineer Regiment (独立工兵十五聯隊)
- 8th Signal Communication Unit (第八通信隊)
- 6th Field Meteorological Unit (第六野戦気象隊)
- 3rd Field Survey Unit (第三野戦測量隊)

4th Flight Group - Major Gen. Tomo Fujita [8][2] (Formed on September 19, 1938, under the 21st Army)

- 64th Hiko Sentai - Major Tamiya Teranishi,[2][3] (Base: Ertaokou 8/38 – 11/38)
  - 1st Chutai - Captain Mitsugu Sawada
    - Nakajima Ki-27 fighter aircraft
  - 2nd Chutai - Captain Tsuguroku Nakao
    - Kawasaki Ki-10 fighter aircraft
    - Nakajima Ki-27 fighter aircraft
- 27th Hiko Sentai - ? [2][3]
  - 1st Chutai - ?
    - Light bomber - ?
- 31st Hiko Sentai - ? (Base: Canton 11/38 – ) [2][3]
  - Light bomber unit.
- 1st Aviation Corps (reconnaissance aircraft)[2]
- 94th Flight Group [2]
- 97th Flight Group [2]
- 3rd Flying Field Squadron [2]
- 1st Field Operation Flying Field team.[2]

Notes:

- 21st Army formed on September 19, 1938, and attacks Guangzhou October 12, 1938. [2]

== Tactical Organization of the 21st Army ==
21st Army

- Oikawa Detachment (及川支隊)
  - 9th Infantry Brigade (Detached from 5th Division)
    - 11th Infantry Regiment
  - 5th Engineer Regiment (Detached from 5th Division)
    - 1st Company
  - Forces under Oikawa Detachment:
    - 52nd Independent Light Armoured Car Company
    - 10th Independent Mountain Artillery Regiment (1 Battalion)
      - 1st Battalion
    - 15th Independent Engineer Regiment
- 18th Division
  - 23rd Infantry Brigade
    - 55th Infantry Regiment
    - 56th Infantry Regiment
  - 35th Infantry Brigade
    - 114th Infantry Regiment
    - 124th Infantry Regiment (Detached except for 3rd Battalion)
      - 3rd Battalion
  - 22nd Cavalry Battalion
  - 18th Mountain Artillery Regiment
  - 12th Military Engineer Regiment
  - 12th Transport Regiment
  - Forces under 18th Division:
    - 3rd Independent Machinegun Battalion
    - 21st Independent Machinegun Battalion
    - 11th Independent Light Armoured Car Company
    - 51st Independent Light Armoured Car Company
    - 111th Mountain Artillery Regiment
    - 2nd Mortar Battalion
    - 2nd Independent Heavy Mortar Battalion
- 104th Division
  - 107th Infantry Brigade (108th Infantry Regiment remained in Manchuria)
    - 170th Infantry Regiment
  - 132nd Infantry Brigade (161st Infantry Regiment remained in Manchuria)
    - 137th Infantry Regiment
  - 104th Field Artillery Regiment (2 Battalions remained in Manchuria)
  - 104th Cavalry Regiment (1 Battalion remained in Manchuria)
  - 104th Engineer Regiment
  - 104th Transport Regiment
  - Forces under 104th Division:
    - 124th Infantry Regiment (Detached from 18th Division, 2 Battalions)
      - 1st Battalion
      - 2nd Battalion
    - 6th Independent Machinegun Battalion
    - 5th Field Artillery Regiment (1 Battalion)
      - 2nd Battalion
    - 10th Independent Mountain Artillery Regiment (2 Battalions)
      - 2nd Battalion
      - 3rd Battalion
    - 21st Mortar Battalion (1 Company)
      - 1st Company
    - 11th Independent Heavy Siege Artillery Battalion
- 5th Division
  - 9th Infantry Brigade
    - 41st Infantry Regiment
  - 21st Infantry Brigade
    - 21st Infantry Regiment
    - 42nd Infantry Regiment
  - 5th Field Artillery Regiment (2 Battalions)
    - 1st Battalion
    - 3rd Battalion
  - 5th Cavalry Regiment
  - 5th Engineer Regiment (Except for 1st Company)
  - 5th Transport Regiment
  - Forces under 5th Division:
    - 21st Mortar Battalion (3 Companies)
      - 2nd Company
      - 3rd Company
      - 4th Company
    - 1st Independent Heavy Mortar Battalion
    - 3rd Division's 8th Field Anti-Aircraft Battery
- 21st Army Direct Control
  - 1st Heavy Field Artillery Brigade
  - 3rd Division's 6th, 7th and 9th Field Anti-Aircraft Batteries
  - 1st Independent Balloon Company

== Imperial Japanese Navy ==
5th Fleet - Vice Admiral Kōichi Shiozawa (塩澤中将)

- 9th Cruiser Division - Vice Admiral Kōichi Shiozawa (塩澤中将)
  - Cruiser Myōkō (妙高) (Flagship)
  - Light Cruiser Tama (多摩)
- 10th Cruiser Division - Rear Admiral Seiichiro Fujimori (藤森少将)
  - Light Cruiser Tenryū (天龍)
  - Light Cruiser Tatsuta (龍田)
- 8th Cruiser Division - Rear Admiral Jisaburo Ozawa (小澤少将)
  - Light Cruiser Kinu (鬼怒)
  - Light Cruiser Yura (由良)
  - Light Cruiser Naka (那珂)
- 2nd Torpedo Squadron
  - Light Cruiser Jintsū (神通)
  - 8th Destroyer Division
    - Destroyer Amagiri (天霧)
    - Destroyer Yūgiri (夕霧)
    - Destroyer Asagiri (朝霧)
  - 12th Destroyer Division
    - Destroyer Shirakumo (白雲)
    - Destroyer Murakumo (叢雲)
    - Destroyer Shinonome (東雲)
    - Destroyer Usugumo (薄雲)
- 5th Torpedo Squadron
  - Light Cruiser Nagara (長良)
  - 16th Destroyer Division
    - Destroyer Fuyō (芙蓉)
    - Destroyer Asagao (朝顔)
    - Destroyer Karukaya (刈萱)
  - 23rd Destroyer Division
    - Destroyer Kikuzuki (菊月)
    - Destroyer Mochizuki (望月)
    - Destroyer Mikazuki (三日月)
    - Destroyer Yūzuki (夕月)
- First Carrier Division
  - Aircraft Carrier Kaga (加賀)
  - 29th Destroyer Division
    - Destroyer Oite (追風)
    - Destroyer Hayate (疾風)
- Second Carrier Division
  - Aircraft Carrier Sōryū (蒼龍)
  - Light Aircraft Carrier Ryūjō (龍驤)
  - 30th Destroyer Division
    - Destroyer Mutsuki (睦月)
    - Destroyer Mochizuki (望月)
    - Destroyer Kisaragi (如月)
    - Destroyer Yayoi (弥生)
- Second Base Force
- 14th Air Group
- Takao Air Group
- Seaplane Tender Chitose (千歳)
- Seaplane Tender Kamikawa Maru (神川丸)
- 3rd Destroyer Division
  - Destroyer Shimakaze (島風)
  - Destroyer Shiokaze (汐風)
  - Destroyer Nadakaze (灘風)
- 1st Gunboat Division
  - Special Gunboat Shuri Maru (首里丸)
  - Special Gunboat Nagatoshiyama Maru (長壽山丸)
  - Special Gunboat Nagashiroyama Maru (長白山丸)
- 1st Combined Air Group
- Additional Units:
  - 11th Minesweeper Division
    - Minesweeper No. 16 (掃十六)
    - Minesweeper No. 14 (掃十四)
    - Minesweeper No. 15 (掃十五)
    - Minesweeper No. 13 (掃十三)
    - Minesweeper No. 18 (掃十八)
    - Minesweeper No. 17 (掃十七)

== China ==
Canton Area Defense October 1938 [1]

4th Route Army - Yu Han-mou [1]

- 62nd Army - Chang Ta
  - 151st Division - Mo His-teh
  - 152nd Division - Chen Chang
- 63rd Army - Chang Jui-kuei
  - 153rd Division - Chang Jui-kuei
  - 154th Division - Liang Shih-chi
  - 182nd Division - Li Zhen
- 65th Army - Li Chen-chiu
  - 156th Division - Li Chiangi
  - 157th Division - Huang Tao
  - 158th Division - Tseng Yu-chiang
- 9th Separate Brigade - Li Chen-liang
- 20th Separate Brigade - Chen-liang
- 2nd Separate Regiment - ?
- Humen Fortress Command - Chen Tse
- Chen Chongfan’s Artillery Brigade - Chen Chongfan
- A Tank Battalion from Canton Tank Corps - ?
- Anti-Aircraft Gun Battalion - ?
- Tax Police Division - Sun Liren

Navy[1]

- River Defense Command - ?
  - Haimen Fortress
  - Pearl River flotilla
    - Shao-ho
    - Hai-chou
    - Hai-hu
    - Hai-ou

Airforce[1] Kwang tung Air Defense command - ? (3 x 75mm AA batteries, 20 lesser caliber AA batteries, 4 searchlights )

- 41st AAA Regt.
  - 1 battery ? mm (Humen Fortress)
  - ?
- 45th AAA Regt.
  - 2 76.2mm AA batteries (Canton)
  - ?
- 3rd Searchlight detachment
  - 4 searchlights

== Sources ==
[1] Hsu Long-hsuen and Chang Ming-kai, History of The Sino-Japanese War (1937–1945) 2nd Ed., 1971. Translated by Wen Ha-hsiung, Chung Wu Publishing; 33, 140th Lane, Tung-hwa Street, Taipei, Taiwan Republic of China.

[3] Sino-Japanese Air War 1937-45

[4] Madej, W. Victor Japanese Armed Forces Order of Battle, 1937-1945 [2 vols] Allentown, PA: 1981

March 1938

- 2nd Carrier Division
  - RYUJO (CF Toshihiko Odawara)
    - F 9 Mitsubishi A5M
    - DB 15 D1A1
  - SORYU
    - F 18 A5M & A4N1
    - DB 27 DA2
    - TB 12 B4Y1
