= Japanese invasion of French Indochina order of battle =

This is the order of battle for the Japanese invasion of French Indochina (22–26 September 1940) during World War II.

== Japan ==
=== Army ===
5th Division – Lt. Gen. Aketo Nakamura [1]

- 9th Infantry Brigade
  - 11th Infantry Regiment
  - 41st Infantry Regiment
- 21st Infantry Brigade
  - 21st Infantry Regiment
  - 42nd Infantry Regiment
- 5th Mountain Artillery Regiment
- 5th Cavalry Regiment
- 5th Engineer Regiment
- 5th Transport Regiment

Indochina Expeditionary Army – Maj. Gen. Takuma Nishimura [1]

- Indochina Expeditionary Infantry Group – Maj. Gen. Takeshi Sakurada
- 2nd Imperial Guards Infantry Regiment – Col. Kunio Osonoe
- Indochina Expeditionary Tank Unit (14th Tank Regiment)
- Indochina Expeditionary AA Gun Unit
- Signal Unit and others

Army Air Force

- 1st Hikodan Headquarters
  - 59th Sentai
  - 90th Sentai
  - ground service units
- 3rd Hikoshidan Headquarters
  - 18th I F Chutai
  - 60th Sentai
  - ground service units

=== Navy ===
2nd Fleet

- Destroyer Squadron 3
  - CL Sendai
  - Destroyer Divisions 12 and 20 with DD Nenohi

IJN airforce: [4]

- Carrier Hiryū
  - Fighter daitai – Mitsubishi A5M
  - Bomber daitai – Aichi D1A2
  - attack daitai – Yokosuka B4Y1
- Seaplane tender Kamikawa Maru
  - 4 Type 94 Kawanishi E7K2 “Alf” reconnaissance float biplanes
  - 8 Type 95 Nakajima E8N2 “Dave” reconnaissance float biplanes

Japanese warships and transports carrying Expeditionary Force lying off Haiphong in the Gulf of Tonkin.

== Vichy France ==
=== Army ===
Hanoi – Général de Corps d'Armée Maurice Martin

Haiphong

- shore defenses

Lang Son sector

- 2nd Brigade – Général de brigade Germain Mennerat
  - five battalions of infantry:
    - I/3rd Régiment de Tirailleurs Tonkinois (RTT)
    - II/5th Régiment Ėtranger d'Infanterie (REI)
    - I/9th Régiment d'Infanterie Coloniale (RIC)
    - ?
    - ?
  - a group of tanks,
  - a group of 75 mm artillery
  - a battery of 155 mm artillery

That Khe – 1 company of II/3rd Régiment de Tirailleurs Tonkinois (RTT)
Nam Quam – 2 companies of II/3rd Régiment d'Infanterie Coloniale (RIC)
Chima – 1 Platoon of a company of II/3rd Régiment de Tirailleurs Tonkinois (RTT)
Loc Binh – bulk of a company of II/3rd Régiment de Tirailleurs Tonkinois (RTT)
Na Dzuong – elements of 9th Régiment d'Infanterie Coloniale (RIC)

All told, about 5000 troops representing elements of 3rd Régiment de Tirailleurs Tonkinois, 9th Régiment d'Infanterie Coloniale, and 5th Régiment Étranger d'Infanterie.

Reserves:

- IV/3rd Régiment de Tirailleurs Tonkinois (RTT) – to counterattack toward Dong Dang
- "fresh battalions" – Lang Giai and Lang Nac barring the route from Lang Son to Hanoi

=== Air Force ===
This French aerial order of battle is based on Christian-Jacques Ehrengardt, "Ciel de feu en Indochine, 1939–1945", Aéro Journal, 29, 1 (2003), pp. 4–26, augmented by Claude d'Abzac-Epezy, L'Armée de l'air de Vichy, 1940–1944 (Service historique de l'Armée de l'air, 1997). The exact number of Potez 25 is unknown; there were around seventy. Three Potez 63 destined for China were also requisitioned in Haiphong.

- 41st Autonomous Air Group (groupe aérien autonome)
  - 1st Observation Squadron (escadrille d'observation) at Pursat — Potez 25
  - 2nd Bombardment Squadron (escadrille de bombardement) at Tong — four Farman 221
- 42nd Autonomous Air Group
  - 1st Observation Squadron at Pursat — Potez 25
  - 2nd Bombardment Squadron at Biên Hòa— six Potez 542
- Mixed Air Group (groupe aérien mixte) 595
  - 1st Observation Squadron at Bạch Mai — Potez 25
  - 2nd Fighter Squadron (escadrille de chasse) at Bach Mai — twelve Morane-Saulnier 406
- Mixed Air Group 596
  - 1st Observation Squadron at Tourane — Potez 25
- Southern Base Command (Commandement des bases du Sud)
  - 1st Squadron at Cat Lai — ten Loire 130, two CAMS 37, two CAMS 55

In addition to the above forces under the Air Force, the seaplanes of the navy in Indochine were concentrated at Bãi Cháy into a new section:

- Seaplane Section of the Navy (Section d'hydravions de la Marine, SHM) — one Loire 130, two Potez 452, four Gourdou-Leseurre 832

== Sources ==
- Vichy Indo-China vs Japan, 1940
- Sino-Japanese Air War 1937 – 1945
- Lacroix, Eric & Wells II, Linton (1997). Japanese Cruisers of the Pacific War. Annapolis, Maryland: Naval Institute Press. p. 210. ISBN 0-87021-311-3.
