= 21st Independent Mixed Brigade =

Imperial Japanese Army formation

- Active: 1941–43
- Country: Japan
- Branch: Imperial Japanese Army
- Size: Three infantry battalions
- Engagements: World War II: New Guinea campaign

The 21st Independent Mixed Brigade (21st IMB) was an infantry brigade of the Imperial Japanese Army raised during World War II. Formed in January 1941 in Osaka, Japan, the brigade consisted of a single infantry regiment and support elements. It undertook occupation duties in Indochina before being sent to Malaya and then Rabaul. In late 1942, the brigade was sent to take part in the Battle of Buna–Gona in New Guinea. It was withdrawn to Rabaul, and then Japan, in June 1943. Elements of the brigade were converted into other formations and the formation ceased to exist in July 1943.

== History ==
The 21st IMB was established to be used in the occupation of French Indochina. It was formed in Osaka, Japan, from the 170th Infantry Regiment, which was detached from the 140th Division in January 1941. Its commander was Major General Yamagata Tsuyuo. It consisted of a single, three battalion infantry regiment, which was unique amongst the other Japanese mixed brigades. In addition, it was supported by a company of tanks, a field hospital, anti-aircraft company, signals, a mountain artillery regiment and engineers. In total it consisted of about 3,700 troops. This was much smaller than the 1st to 20th IMBs, which had been established between 1937 and 1940 to occupy Japanese-held areas of China and had a strength of about 4,900 officers and men.

Commencing in May 1942, the brigade undertook occupation duties in Hanoi following the Japanese invasion of French Indochina, as part of the Southern Army. This was followed by a move to Malaya and then Rabaul at the end of the year, although the brigade's motor transport remained in Indochina. The 21st IMB arrived at Rabaul on 22 November; at this time it had not seen combat.

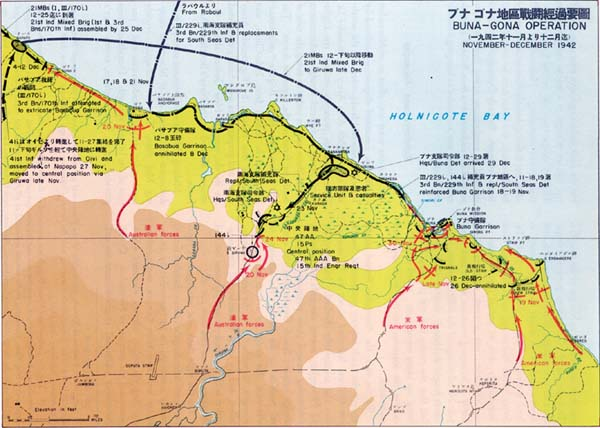
Map depicting the movements of Japanese forces, including the 21st IMB

At Rabaul, the brigade came under operational control of the 8th Area Army and it was subsequently tasked with reinforcing Japanese troops in the Buna–Gona area, in New Guinea. After leaving their horses in Rabaul, the movement was undertaken aboard several destroyers, and was carried out over the course of several trips in late November and early December, which were severely disrupted by Allied air attack. Some elements of the brigade were lost during the reinforcement movement including the barge carrying the 170th Infantry Regiment's commander and its regimental flag. Consequently, the brigade's troops were scattered over several areas (the Mambare River, the Kumusi, Giruwa), before concentrating around Napapo, to the west of Gona.

In New Guinea, the brigade's commander assumed control of all 18th Army (less the South Seas Detachment) units around Buna, Giruwa, and Basabua, joining with the 41st Infantry Regiment to form the Buna Detachment. The 21st IMB then fought against the US troops advancing from Buna to the west during the Battle of Buna–Gona. The brigade took heavy casualties during the subsequent fighting. Around January 1943, the Japanese began evacuating Giruwa and elements of the brigade, totalling about 270 troops, withdrew to the Kumusi River.

While the I and III Battalions of the 170th Infantry Regiment served in New Guinea, the regiment's II Battalion was deployed to Wake Island and was eventually subsumed into the 13th Infantry Regiment. By June 1943, the brigade was withdrawn to Rabaul and then ordered to return to Japan; its armoured, artillery and anti-aircraft elements were re-designated as independent units and dispersed, while the brigade was disbanded in July 1943. The brigade's commander was subsequently reassigned to a garrison unit in Kyoto.

== See also ==
- Independent Mixed Brigades (Imperial Japanese Army)
