= Jūrō Gotō =

Japanese Major-General

- 後藤 十郎
- Born: November 2, 1887; Yamagata, Japan
- Died: May 25, 1984 (aged 96)
- Education: Imperial Japanese Army Academy
- Military career
- Allegiance: Empire of Japan
- Branch: Imperial Japanese Army
- Service years: 1907–1945
- Rank: Major general
- Units: 15th Infantry Brigade; IJA 2nd Division; IJA 104th Division; 4th Depot Division
- Commands: Sendai Regimental District; 16th Infantry Regiment; Tsushima Fortress; 132nd Infantry Brigade; IJA 21st Army; Kofu Regimental District; Kofu Area Command
- Conflicts: Second Sino-Japanese War; Canton Operation; Swatow Operation; 1939–1940 Winter Offensive; World War II

Jūrō Gotō (後藤 十郎, Gotō Jūrō; November 2, 1887 – May 25, 1984) was a major general in the Japanese Imperial Army in the Second Sino-Japanese War.

== Biography ==
A native of Yamagata Prefecture, Gotō was a graduate of the 19th class of the Imperial Japanese Army Academy in 1907.

From 1934 to 1935, Gotō was commander of the Sendai Regimental District, then was commander of the 16th Infantry Regiment of 15th Infantry Brigade, IJA 2nd Division until 1937.

At the start of the Second Sino-Japanese War, Gotō commanded the Tsushima Fortress until 1938, when he was promoted to major general and appointed commander of the 132nd Infantry Brigade of the IJA 104th Division. Gotō was involved in the IJA 21st Army Canton Operation in southern China. He commanded the 21st Army forces in the landings of the Swatow Operation in June 1939. His division fought to defend the Canton region during the Chinese 1939-40 Winter Offensive.

In 1940, Gotō was recalled to Japan, and attached to the 4th Depot Division. He went into the reserves and retired the same year. In 1941, Gotō was recalled and placed in command of the Yokohama Regimental District until 1942. In 1945, he was made commander of the Kofu Regimental District and Kofu Area Command in Yamanashi Prefecture.

== Sources ==
=== Books ===
- Dorn, Frank (1974). The Sino-Japanese War, 1937–41: From Marco Polo Bridge to Pearl Harbor. MacMillan. ISBN 0-02-532200-1.
- Madej, W. Victor (1981). Japanese Armed Forces Order of Battle, 1937–1945. Allentown, PA: The Marine Corps Association.
