= General Martin =

General Martin may refer to:

- Alfred Martin (Indian Army officer) (1853–1926), British Indian Army lieutenant general
- Augustus Pearl Martin (1835–1902), Massachusetts Militia brigadier general
- Charles Martin (Oregon politician) (1863–1946), U.S. Army major general
- Charles Irving Martin (1871–1953), U.S. Army major general
- Claude Martin (1735–1800), British East India Company major general
- Corey Martin (fl. 1990s–2020s), U.S. Air Force major general
- Donna W. Martin (fl. 1980s–2020s), U.S. Army major general
- Edward Fowell Martin (1875–1950), Australian Army brigadier general
- Frederick Martin (general) (1882–1954), U.S. Army Air Force major general
- Glen W. Martin (1916–1994), U.S. Air Force lieutenant general
- Gregg F. Martin (born 1956), U.S. Army major general
- Gregory S. Martin (born 1948), U.S. Air Force general
- J. S. S. Martin (1888–1973), Indian Medical Service major general
- Jack Martin (basketball) (1922–2015), Texas Air National Guard brigadier general
- James Fitzgerald Martin (1876–1958), British Army major general
- James Green Martin (1819–1878), Confederate States Army brigadier general
- John L. Martin Jr. (1920–2009), U.S. Air Force major general
- John Donelson Martin (1830–1862), Confederate States Army acting brigadier general
- Joseph Martin (general) (1740–1808), Virginia Militia brigadier general in the American Revolutionary War
- Joseph M. Martin (born 1962), U.S. Army general
- Kalfie Martin (1910–2000), South African Air Force lieutenant general
- Maurice Martin (general) (1878–1952) French Army general
- Michael E. Martin (fl. 1990s–2020s), U.S. Air Force major general
- Thaddeus J. Martin (born 1956), U.S. Air Force major general
- Theodore D. Martin (born 1960), U.S. Army lieutenant general
- William Franklin Martin (1863–1942), U.S. Army brigadier general
- William T. Martin (1823—1910), Confederate States Army major general

== See also ==
- Mark S. Martins (born c. 1960), U.S. Army brigadier general
- Attorney General Martin (disambiguation)
