= 170th Regiment =

170th Regiment may refer to:

- 170th Infantry Regiment (Imperial Japanese Army)
- 170th New York Infantry Regiment, Union Army
- 170th Ohio Infantry Regiment, Union Army
