= Rikishi (disambiguation) =

A rikishi is a sumo wrestler.

Rikishi may also refer to:

- Rikishi (wrestler) (born 1965), American professional wrestler
- Rikichi Andō (1884–1946), general in the Imperial Japanese Army and 19th and final Japanese Governor-General of Taiwan from 30 December 1944 to October 1945
