= Indochina Expeditionary Army =

- Active: September 7, 1940 - July 5, 1941
- Country: Empire of Japan
- Branch: Imperial Japanese Army
- Type: Infantry
- Role: Army Corps
- Engagements: Invasion of French Indochina

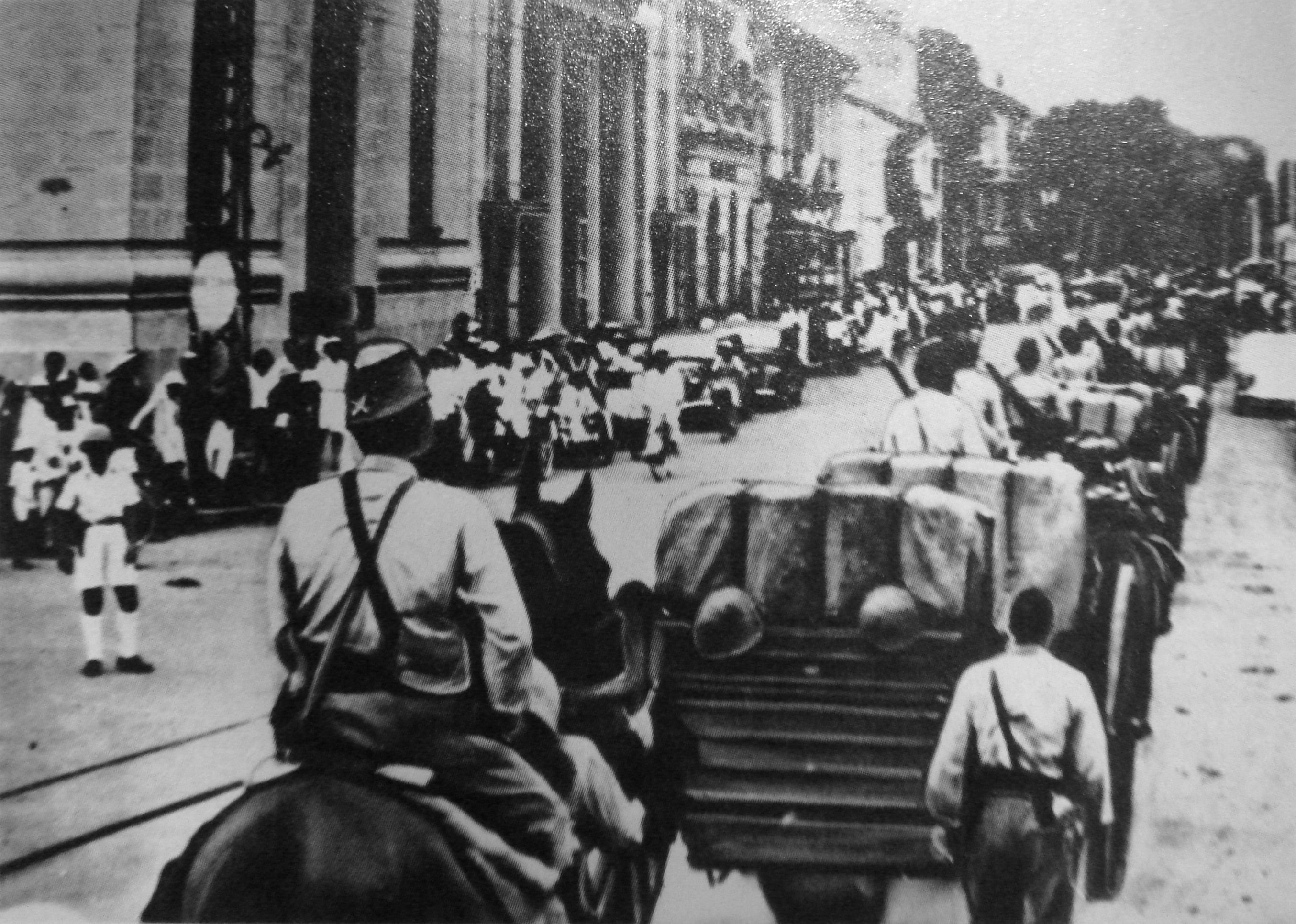
Japanese troops entering Saigon, c 1941

The Indochina Expeditionary Army (印度支那派遣軍, Indoshina Hakengun) was an amphibious army corps of the Imperial Japanese Army formed on September 7, 1940 to coordinate the invasion and occupation of French Indochina during the Second Sino-Japanese War. It was supported by a contingent from the Imperial Japanese Navy's IJN 5th Fleet and naval aircraft from the aircraft carrier Hiryū and air bases on Hainan Island.

== History ==
Imperial General Headquarters deemed that control of Vichy-controlled French Indochina would make the Japanese blockade of China much more effective and would hasten the collapse of the Kuomintang government of China. Japan began pressuring the Vichy government to close the railway between Haiphong and Yunnan on September 5, the Southern Expeditionary Army Group organized the amphibious Indochina Expeditionary Army under its command to coordinate a joint operation with the Japanese 5th Infantry Division of the Japanese Southern China Area Army.

On September 22, Japan and Vichy Indochina signed an accord which granted basing and transit rights, but limited the number of Japanese troops which could be stationed in Indochina to 6,000, and limited the total number of troops that could be in the colony at any given time to 25,000. Within a few hours of the agreement, the 5th Division crossed the border at three places, closed in on the railhead, and the Battle of Lang Son ensued. Vichy France protested the breach of the agreement on September 23, but the Indochina Expeditionary Army, supported by the Imperial Japanese Navy, began sorties on the following morning on Haiphong in the Gulf of Tonkin. Japanese forces landed on September 26, and captured the city of Hanoi by evening.

After the operation was completed, the Indochina Expeditionary Army was officially disbanded on July 5, 1941.

== See also ==
- Indochina Expedition order of battle
- Invasion of French Indochina

== Commanders ==
	Name	From	To
Commanding officer	Major General Takuma Nishimura	7 September 1940	5 July 1941
Chief of Staff	Major General Isamu Cho	7 September 1940	5 July 1941

== Literature ==
- Hsu Long-hsuen and Chang Ming-kai, History of The Sino-Japanese War (1937–1945) 2nd Ed., 1971. Translated by Wen Ha-hsiung, Chung Wu Publishing; 33, 140th Lane, Tung-hwa Street, Taipei, Taiwan Republic of China. Pg. 317
- Jowett, Bernard (1999). The Japanese Army 1931-45 (Volume 2, 1942-45). Osprey Publishing. ISBN 1-84176-354-3.
- Madej, Victor (1981). Japanese Armed Forces Order of Battle, 1937-1945. Game Publishing Company. ASIN: B000L4CYWW.
- Marston, Daniel (2005). The Pacific War Companion: From Pearl Harbor to Hiroshima. Osprey Publishing. ISBN 1-84176-882-0.
