= 104th Division (Imperial Japanese Army) =

- Active: 1937–1945
- Country: Empire of Japan
- Branch: Imperial Japanese Army
- Type: Infantry
- Size: 25000
- Garrison/HQ: Osaka
- Nickname: Phoenix division
- Engagements: Battle of Lake Khasan; Canton Operation; Operation Ichi-Go

Commanders
- Notable commanders: Kisaburo Hamamoto

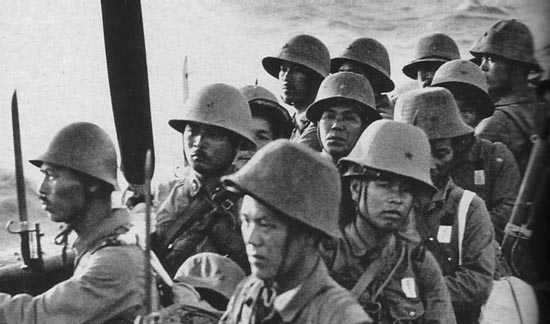
Men of the 104th Division, 137th Regiment, during the Swatow Operation, June 1939

The 104th Division (第104師団, Dai-hyakuyon Shidan) was an infantry division of the Imperial Japanese Army. Its call sign was the Phoenix Division (鳳兵団, Ootori Heidan). It was formed 16 June 1938 in Osaka as a B-class square division. The nucleus for the formation was the 4th division headquarters. The division was originally subordinated to the Northern China Area Army.

== History ==
Originally the 104th division was sent for the escalating Battle of Lake Khasan on Soviet border, but the battle was finished 11 August 1938. Therefore, the 104th division was attached to 21st Army on 19 September 1938 and sailed from Dalian on 4 October 1938. It arrived in Daya Bay on 12 October 1938. The 137th Infantry Regiment then landed and proceeded inland to isolate Hong Kong, as part of the large-scale Canton Operation. Afterwards, the main garrison of the 104th Division was established in Conghua District. On 9 February 1940 the 21st Army was dissolved and the 104th Division was reassigned to the Southern China Area Army.

The 104th Division was reassigned to the 23rd Army in January 1941, and simultaneously lost the 170th Infantry Regiment, becoming a triangular division. The detached regiment was converted into the 21st Independent Mixed Brigade which was eventually sent to participate in the Invasion of Southern French Indochina.

After a long garrison service in Guangzhou, the 104th Division participated in Operation Ichi-Go, capturing Zhaoqing on 16 September 1944, Wuxuan County on 4 November 1944 and Xiangzhou County on 6 November 1944. Also, it captured Huizhou on 15 January 1945 and Haifeng County on 18 January 1945. Until the surrender of Japan on 15 August 1945, the 104th Division built coastal fortifications along the Daya Bay – Haifeng County – Lufeng – Huizhou line. The 161st Infantry Regiment and 104th Transport Regiment were concentrated at Daya Bay. The 108th Infantry Regiment was at Dongguan. It was moved to the port of Taiping, Perak by 16 February 1946. The 137th Infantry Regiment was garrisoned at Haifeng County, and was moved to Humen Town port on 19 February 1946. The 104th Artillery Regiment was located on the southern outskirts of Huizhou, but was transferred on 18 February 1946 to Dongguan. The 104th Engineer Regiment was in Huizhou.

The division departed from Humen Town port between 28 March and 2 April 1946, and arrived at Uraga, Kanagawa between 6 and 19 April 1946. The dissolution of the 104th Division was complete by 23 May 1946.

From the time it was organized until its return to Japan in April 1946, a total of 1,936 troops of the 104th Division died from all causes and another 97 troops went missing in South China.

== See also ==
- List of Japanese Infantry Divisions
- Independent Mixed Brigades (Imperial Japanese Army)

== Notes ==
- This article incorporates material from Japanese Wikipedia page 第104師団 (日本軍), accessed 16 June 2016
