= Yu Hanmou =

Chinese National Revolutionary Army general

- 余漢謀
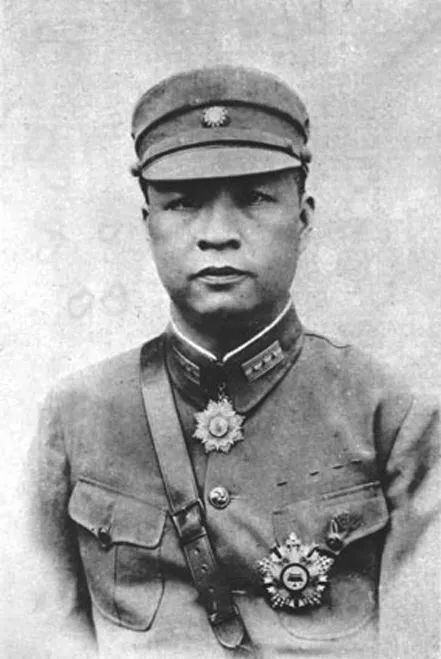

2nd Commander-in-Chief of the Republic of China Army
- In office 13 May 1948 – 9 February 1949
- President: Chiang Kai-shek; Li Zongren
- Preceded by: Gu Zhutong
- Succeeded by: Zhang Fakui

Personal details
- Born: 22 September 1896 Gaoyao, Guangdong, Qing dynasty
- Died: 27 December 1981 (aged 85) Taipei, Taiwan
- Awards: Order of the Sacred Tripod; Order of the Cloud and Banner

Military service
- Allegiance: Republic of China
- Branch/service: (Republic of China (1912–1949)) National Revolutionary Army
- Rank: Colonel general
- Battles/wars: Warlord Era; Guangdong-Guangxi War; Northern Expedition; Second World War; Second Sino-Japanese War; Canton Operation; Swatow Operation; Operation Ichi-Go; Chinese Civil War; Encirclement campaigns (in Jiangxi); Long March; Fall of Hainan
Yu Hanmou
- Traditional Chinese: 余漢謀
- Simplified Chinese: 余汉谋
Transcriptions
Standard Mandarin
- Hanyu Pinyin: Yú Hànmóu
- Bopomofo: ㄩˊㄏㄢˋㄇㄡˊ
- Wade–Giles: Yü^{2} Han^{4}-mou^{2}
Yue: Cantonese
- Jyutping: Jyu^{4} Hon^{3}-mau^{4}
Southern Min
- Tâi-lô: Û Hàn-bôo

Yu Hanmou (Chinese: 余漢謀; 22 September 1896 – 27 December 1981) was a Chinese National Revolutionary Army general during the Second Sino-Japanese War and the Chinese Civil War.

== Biography ==
Yu was born in Gaoyao, Guangdong in 1896. He graduated from the Baoding Military Academy in 1919. He joined the Kuomintang during this period. He served during the Encirclement campaigns against the Chinese communists during the 1930s, and was promoted to lieutenant general in 1936. During the war with Japan, he commanded the defense of Guangdong in the Canton Operation and the 1939-40 Winter Offensive. While Guangzhou was lost to the Japanese, Yu's forces were able to defeat the Japanese in northern Guangdong. Later in 1944 until the end of the war, he commanded the 7th War Area, participating in Operation Ichi-Go.

Yu was promoted to general in 1946, and later to commander-in-chief of the Republic of China Army in 1949. In 1949, during the final months of the Chinese Civil War, his forces were defeated by the Chinese communists in Guangdong, with only Hainan Island being under Nationalist control. Yu later led the Nationalist evacuation from Hainan to Taiwan in May 1950. There, he served as a strategic advisor and was promoted to colonel general in 1965. He died of cancer in Taipei in 1981.
