= Swatow Operation =

1939 Second Sino-Japanese War operation

Coordinates: 23.3388°N 116.7120°E

- Part of the Second Sino-Japanese War and the interwar period
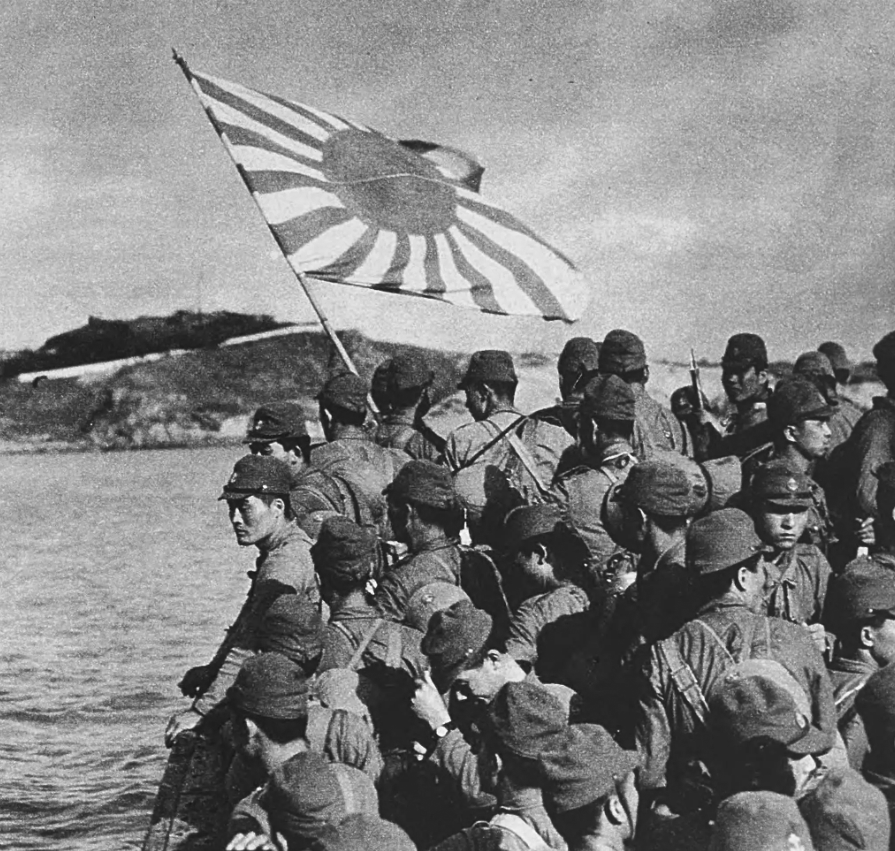
- Troops of the Sasebo 9th SNLF shortly before landing in Swatow, June 21 1939
Date	June 21–27, 1939 (6 days)
Location	Shantou city in the Republic of China
Result	Japanese victory
Territorial changes	Japanese forces occupied Shantou and Chaozhou

Belligerents
Japan	China

Commanders and leaders
(Empire of Japan) Nobutake Kondō (Empire of Japan) Jūrō Gotō	(Republic of China (1912–1949)) Hua Chen-chung

Units involved
Imperial Japanese Navy; Imperial Japanese Army	National Revolutionary Army Ground Forces

Strength
43,000	13,669 (Note: Includes the 9th independent brigade and Security Corps; Excludes the 3rd battalion of the 627th regiment of the 9th independent brigade; Excludes the 6th reserve division and 1st advance column)

Casualties and losses
Japanese newspaper claim : In the capture of Shantou : 22 killed 44 wounded; In the capture of Chaozhou : 15 killed 70 wounded	Chinese claim: 754 killed 477 wounded 1,258 missing Japanese newspaper claim : In the capture of Shantou : 600 killed 98 POWs; In the capture of Chaozhou : 659 killed

The Swatow Operation (June 21–27, 1939; Chinese: 潮汕戰鬥) was part of a campaign by Japan during the Second Sino-Japanese War to blockade China in order to prevent it from communicating with the outside world and importing needed arms and materials. Control of Swatow and its harbour would provide a base to make the blockade of Guangdong province more effective.

== Order of Battle ==
Main Article: Swatow Operation order of battle

=== Japan ===
==== Imperial Japanese Army ====
21st Army Commander: Lieutenant General Rikichi Ando

- Goto Task Force Commander: Major General Juro Goto
  - Goto Task Force:
    - 132nd Infantry Brigade
      - 137th Infantry Regiment: Colonel Takashi Mori
      - 161st Infantry Regiment (excluding 1st Battalion): Colonel Tadao Inui
      - Independent 10th Mountain Gun Regiment (excluding 3rd Battalion)
  - Attached Units:
    - Independent 70th Infantry Battalion: Major Jitaro Oda
    - Landing Work Force
    - Other small units

==== Imperial Japanese Navy ====
5th Fleet Commander: Vice Admiral Nobutake Kondo

- Surface Units:
  - 9th Squadron
  - 5th Torpedo Squadron
  - 12th Minesweeper Unit
  - 21st Minesweeper Unit
  - 45th Destroyer Division
- Air Units:
  - 3rd Combined Naval Air Group
  - Seaplane Tender Chiyoda
  - Canton Aircraft Unit
- Land Units:
  - Sasebo 9th Special Naval Landing Force: Commander Hisayuki Soeda
- Other auxiliary vessels

== Invasion of Swatow ==
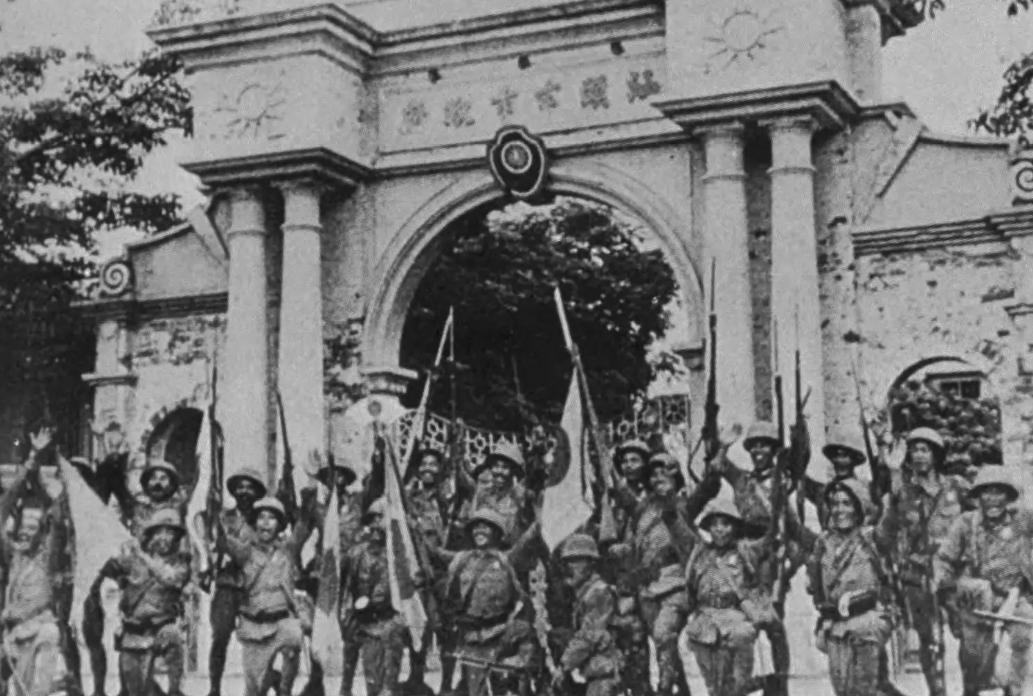
Troops of the Goto Task Force celebrate after capturing Swatow, circa June 22 1939.

On June 6 1939, the Imperial General Headquarters ordered the capture of Swatow. The Goto Detachment stationed in Huangpu, was made the Army's invading force and on June 14 boarded transports to Magong where they would carry out training for the operation. The invasion force left Magong on June 20 and on June 21 at 1 AM invaded Swatow's harbor.

At 02:20 AM, the Independent 70th Infantry Battalion (minus the 3rd Company) attacked Dahao Island (達濠島) south of Swatow, landing on the island's east bank. The battalion eliminated some of the island's defenders before occupying the bank opposite to Swatow.

The main invasion force, consisting of roughly one battalion from the 137th Infantry Regiment and the Independent 70th Infantry Battalion's 3rd Company landed near Xinjin Port (新津港) and drove away a platoon of Chinese defenders. The main force continued towards the eastern sector Swatow City, climbing the Xixi River (西溪河) and successfully landed in Fuzhou (浮洲) at 8:30 AM.

After 5 AM, landing craft carrying a diversionary force made of the 161st Infantry Regiment's 3rd Battalion began their advance towards the mouth of Han River. The battalion had been ordered to move up the river and capture Anbu (菴埠)—a vital chokepoint on the Chaochow – Swatow Railway which would cut off the defender's retreat. Shortly after at 5:20 AM, the Sasebo 9th Special Naval Landing Force began landing on Mayu Island situated in the bay between Swatow and Dahao Island. Encountering minor resistance, the Special Naval Landing Forces swept the island for the enemy and any of their facilities. Just before 6 AM they located the mine control post and severed the power to it.

Under the cover of Navy patrol boats, the 161st Infantry Regiment's 3rd Battalion proceeded up the Han River and its tributaries as the sun rose. At around 10 AM the battalion reached the south end of Anbu and attempted to land but was met with determined resistance from the Chinese defenders. The situation grew chaotic as enemy bullets flew around their landing craft, but Japanese aircraft came to their rescue, bombing the defenders and providing covering fire which allowed the battalion to complete their landing by around 10:30 AM.

Chinese troops from the 9th Independent Brigade continue to resist the 3rd Battalion's advance in to Anbu, but an assault from the Battalion's 9th Company on the right flank managed to break into the city. After 11 AM the battalion had moved from offense to sweeping the city for any remaining resistance. In the afternoon while the battalion continued their sweep, a Chinese sniper concealed in trees spotted the 9th Company's Commander and struck him with a fatal shot to the heart. In total the 3rd Battalion's assault on Anbu resulted in three dead and around 30 more wounded.

While this occurred, the main invasion force pushed towards the rear of Swatow and crushed any resistance they met. By the evening they had advanced two kilometers east of Swatow and completed their sweep of the city by the early hours of June 22, considering the city to be completely secured.

== Advance to Chaozhou ==
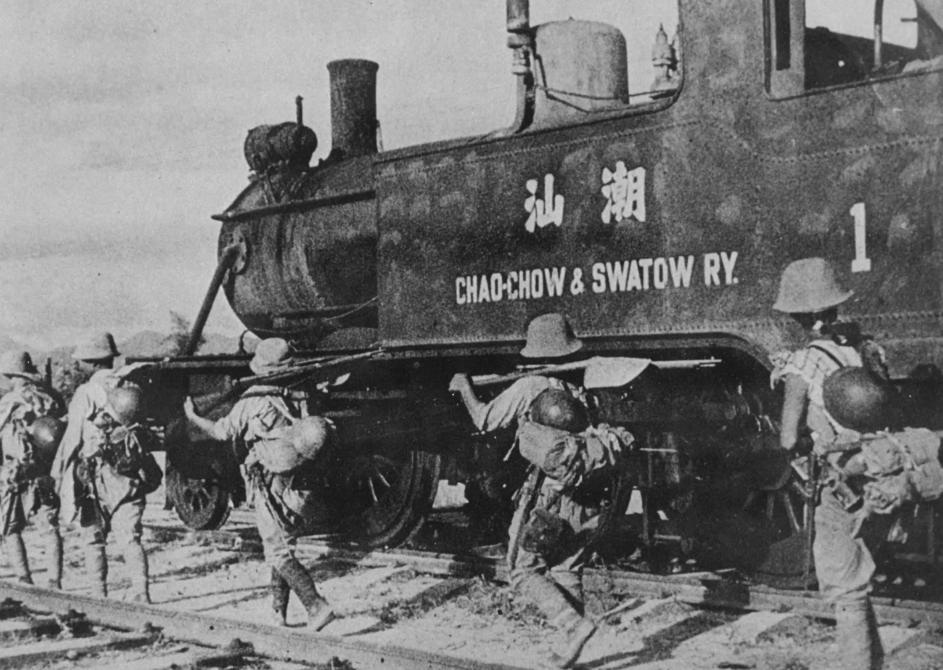
Japanese soldiers advance past an abandoned locomotive on the way to Chaozhou

Just after the Goto Task Force had departed Huangpu for Swatow, they had received information that some 3000-4000 of the enemy was massing west of the city and quickly moving to reinforce it. In response, on June 17 the 104th Division ordered the 161st Infantry Regiment's Headquarters and 2nd Battalion to join the 3rd Battalion already dispatched to the city. The 161st Infantry Regiment's reinforcements arrived in Swatow on the early hours of the 21st and landed after the Goto Task Force's successful takeover of the city. By the 23rd they had made their way up the Hai River and linked up with their 3rd Battalion in Anbu.

Since capturing Swatow, the Chinese 9th Independent Brigade had withdrawn north to defend Chaozhou, establishing a new frontline at Fengxi and a secondary line in Fuyang. The Japanese surmised they were awaiting reinforcements and would launch a counterattack to retake Swatow.

Leaving a guard force from some of the 137th Infantry Regiment and Independent 70th Infantry Battalion behind in recently captured Swatow, the Goto Task Force advanced north towards Chaozhou and commenced their attack on June 25.

Serving as the Task Force's left flank, the 161st Infantry Regiment advanced along the Chaochow – Swatow Railway line towards Fuyang. In the evening, around two kilometers from the outskirts of Fuyang the regiment clashed with some five hundred Chinese troops armed with mortars and water-cooled machine guns. On the right flank, the 137th Infantry Regiment moved up the Hai River and in the afternoon encountered heavy resistance from the Chinese defenders near Fengxi. A platoon led by 2nd Lieutenant Shibayama was selected to carry out a breakthrough assault and managed to force an opening in the enemy's lines, allowing the regiment to push through Fengxi.

Worrying they'd fail to link up with the 137th Infantry Regiment in time, the 161st Infantry Regiment carried out fierce attacks on the enemy positions near Fuyang throughout the night. The regiment's exhausted troops covered in mud finally managed to overtake the positions by 1:30 AM the following morning. While braving difficult weather, light bombers from the Japanese Army's 31st Air Squadron worked closely to support ground forces. By the 26th, the Goto Task Force had toppled the 9th Independent Brigade's fighting power in Fengxi, advancing forward and capturing Chaozhou on the morning of June 27.
