= Tenth Area Army =

10th Area Army
- Active: September 29, 1944 - August 15, 1945
- Country: Empire of Japan
- Branch: Imperial Japanese Army
- Type: Infantry
- Role: Field Army
- Garrison/HQ: Taipei
- Nickname: 湾 (Wan = “bay”)

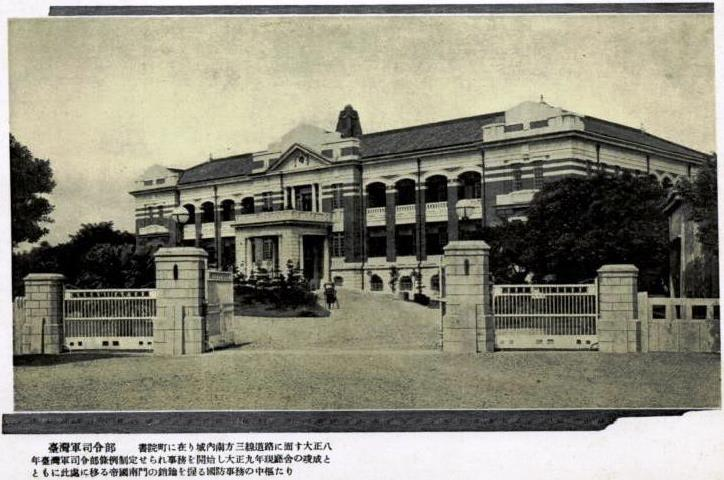

The Tenth Area Army (第10方面軍, Dai-jū hōmen-gun) was a field army of the Imperial Japanese Army during World War II.

== History ==
The 10th Area Army was originally formed out of the Taiwan Army of Japan on September 29, 1944 under the Imperial General Headquarters as part of the last desperate defense effort by the Empire of Japan to deter possible landings of Allied forces in Taiwan during Operation Downfall (or Operation Ketsugō (決号作戦, Ketsugō sakusen) in Japanese terminology). It was headquartered in Taipei. and consisted of the 32nd army, 40th army, and other smaller units.

As priorities after Battle of Okinawa shifted, the 40th army headquarters were reassigned to control the units being raised in Kagoshima Prefecture, and the former units of 40th army were subordinated directly to the 10th Area Army from 14 May 1945.

As with similar field armies raised on the Japanese home islands during this time, the 10th Area Army consisted mostly of poorly trained reservists, conscripted students and home guard militia. In addition, the Japanese had organized the Patriotic Citizens Fighting Corps — which included all healthy men aged 15–60 and women 17–40 — to perform combat support, and ultimately combat jobs. Weapons, training, and uniforms were generally lacking: some men were armed with nothing better than muzzle-loading muskets, longbows, or bamboo spears; nevertheless, they were expected to make do with what they had.

The 10th Area Army was demobilized at the surrender of Japan on August 15, 1945 without having seen combat in Taiwan, although units transferred to the Ryukyu Islands for the Battle of Okinawa were annihilated by American forces.

== List of Commanders ==
	Name	From	To
Commanding officer	General Rikichi Ando	22 September 1944	15 August 1945
Chief of Staff	Lieutenant General Haruki Isayama	22 September 1944	15 August 1945
