= Tadashi Hanaya =

Japanese general (1894-1957)

- 花谷 正
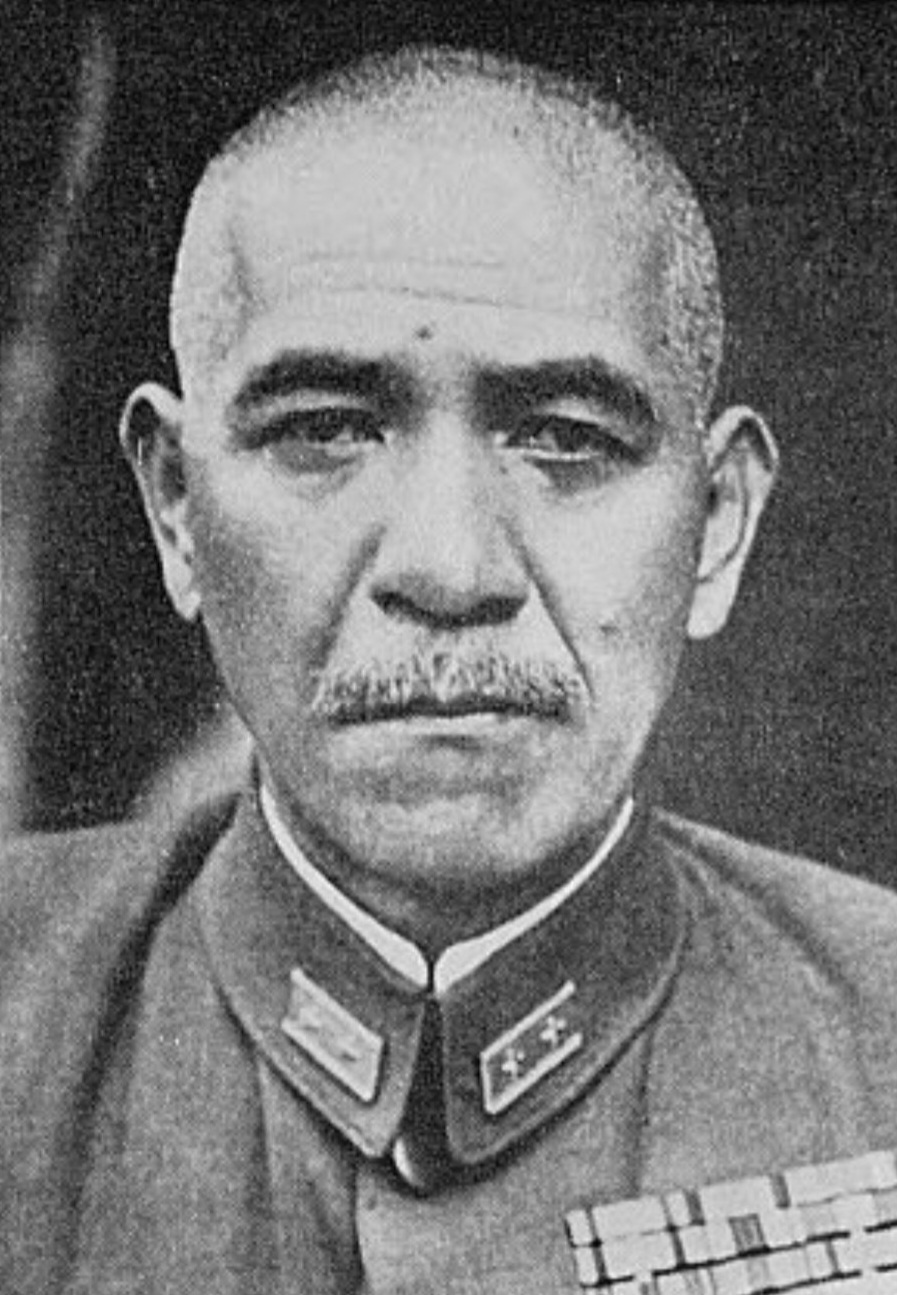
- Born: January 5, 1894; Katsuta District, Okayama, Japan
- Died: August 28, 1957 (aged 63)
- Education: Imperial Japanese Army Academy; Army Staff College
- Military career
- Allegiance: Empire of Japan
- Branch: Imperial Japanese Army
- Service years: 1914–1945
- Rank: Lieutenant General
- Units: IJA 54th Infantry Regiment; Imperial Japanese Army General Staff Office; Kwantung Army
- Commands: IJA 37th Infantry Regiment; Mukden Special Operations Office; IJA 35th Regiment; IJA 43rd Infantry Regiment; Japanese Military Delegation to Manchukuo; IJA 29th Infantry Brigade; IJA 29th Infantry Division; IJA 1st Army; IJA 55th Infantry Division; IJA 39th Army; IJA 18th Area Army
- Conflicts: Mukden incident; Second Sino-Japanese War; Battle of Shanghai; World War II; Burma campaign; Battle of the Admin Box

Tadashi Hanaya (花谷 正, Hanaya Tadashi; 5 January 1894 – 28 August 1957) was a general in the Imperial Japanese Army, commanding Japanese ground forces in Burma during World War II.

== Biography ==
Hanaya was born in Katsuta District, Okayama as the son of a village headman. He attended military preparatory schools, and graduated from the 26th class of the Imperial Japanese Army Academy in May 1914 and was initially assigned to the IJA 54th Infantry Regiment. He graduated from the 34th class of the Army Staff College in November 1922.

Hanaya served in the early portion of his career in the Imperial Japanese Army General Staff Office, and was also stationed at Zhengzhou in China under orders from the Kwantung Army. In August 1929, he became a battalion commander with the IJA 37th Infantry Regiment. As a major in 1931, he was assigned to the military intelligence section of the Kwantung Army and served as head of the Mukden Special Operations Office. In this capacity, he was deeply involved in planning the Mukden incident with General Seishiro Itagaki and General Kanji Ishiwara, which led to the subsequent Japanese occupation of Manchuria. Hanaya subsequently commanded a battalion of the IJA 35th Regiment and returned to the staff of the Kwantung Army in 1935, and the Imperial Japanese Army General Staff in 1936. In August 1937, Hanaya was promoted to colonel, and was given command of the IJA 43rd Infantry Regiment. This regiment was involved in combat in Shanghai around the start of the Second Sino-Japanese War. He was appointed head of the Japanese military delegation to Manchukuo in 1939, following the Nomonhan Incident.

In March 1940, Hanaya was promoted to major general and was given command of the IJA 29th Infantry Brigade. He subsequently served as commander of the infantry group of the IJA 29th Infantry Division in 1941, before being promoted to chief-of-staff of the IJA 1st Army in December 1941. He was promoted to lieutenant general in October 1943, and was assigned command of the IJA 55th Infantry Division in Burma. This division was heavily involved in combat against the British Army in the Battle of the Admin Box from 5 to 23 February 1943. His division was also ordered to invade the Akyab region of Burma from 11 January 1944; however, his offensive was destroyed by British reinforcements and air supremacy and retreated to avoid encirclement. In particular, 19 February 1944, the commander of the 112th regiment broke the radio communications and withdrew his remaining men without order. 112th regiment was by that time down to roughly 400 men from original 3000, and was faced by British forces including "a hundred" of artillery pieces, according to survivor's testimony. Hanaya's men counterattacked along the lower Sittang River in May–June 1945, which allowed part of the IJA 25th Army to escape.

In July 1945, Hanaya was appointed chief of staff of the IJA 39th Army, which was based in Bangkok. However, only 5 days later he was promoted to chief of staff of the IJA 18th Area Army. Hanaya had a reputation for brutalizing the officers under his command, and was universally hated, maintaining his position despite numerous complaints only due to direct support from Hideki Tojo. His methods featured extremely foul language, arbitrary beating (he was cited to say "I beat you because you are easy victim"), ordering ill soldiers out of hospital, and multiple forced suicides of subordinated officers.

He was also one of the first to accept the announcement by emperor Hirohito ending the war. In the immediate postwar era, Hanaya was active in ultra-rightist organizations (acting independently), and published his memoirs on the Manchurian Incident in 1955. Then ill, customary fundraising among former subordinates failed to attract even a single donation, and his funeral was shunned by the community.
