= Eighteenth Area Army =

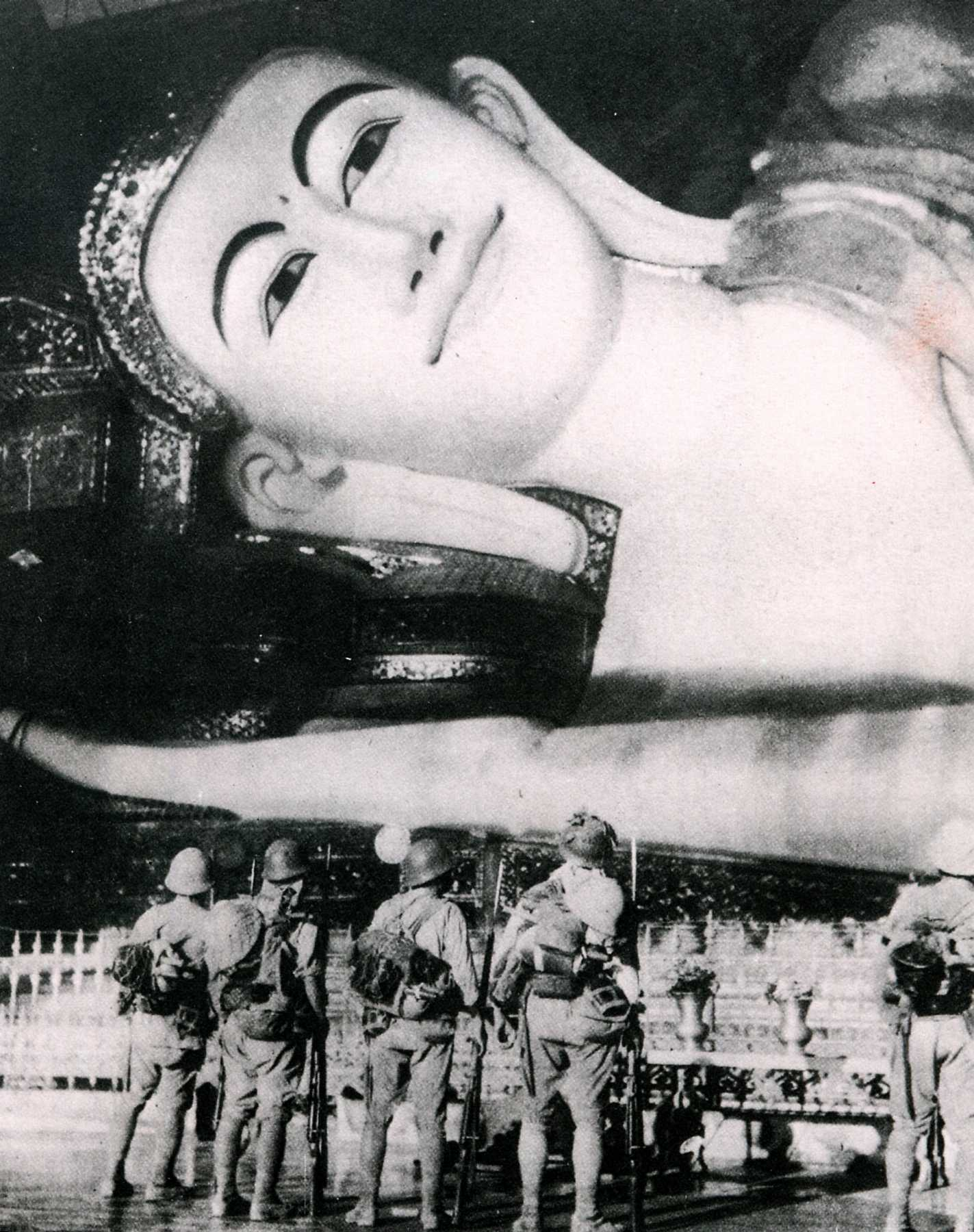
- Japanese troops in Burma
- Active: January 4, 1943 - August 15, 1945
- Country: Empire of Japan
- Branch: Imperial Japanese Army
- Type: Infantry
- Role: Field Army
- Garrison/HQ: Bangkok
- Nickname: 義 (Gi = “righteous”)

The Eighteenth Area Army (第18方面軍, Dai jyūhachi hōmen gun) was a field army of the Imperial Japanese Army during World War II.

== History ==
The 18th Area Army was originally formed on January 4, 1943, as the Thailand Garrison Command (泰国駐屯軍司令官, Tai-koku Chūtongun shirebu). It was renamed the Thirty-ninth Army on December 14, 1944, and became the 18th Area Army on July 7, 1945, shortly before the end of the Pacific War.

The 18th Area Army was under the control of the Southern Expeditionary Army Group as a military reserve and garrison force, ostensibly to help defend the Empire of Japan's nominal ally, the Kingdom of Thailand against possible invasion by the Allies, but in more practical terms, it was present to ensure that Thailand remained an ally to Japan. It was headquartered in Bangkok.

The 18th Area Army was demobilized in Bangkok at the surrender of Japan on August 15, 1945, without having seen combat.

== List of Commanders ==
=== Commanding officer ===
	Name	From	To	Notes
1	Lieutenant General Aketo Nakamura	4 January 1943	20 December 1944	Siam Garrison Army
x	Lieutenant General Aketo Nakamura	20 December 1944	14 July 1945	Japanese 39th Army
x	Lieutenant General Aketo Nakamura	14 July 1945	15 August 1945	18th Area Army

=== Chief of Staff ===
	Name	From	To	Notes
1	Major General Seiji Moriya	4 January 1943	21 January 1943	Siam Garrison Army
2	Major General Kunitaro Yamada	21 January 1943	22 November 1944	Siam Garrison Army
3	Major General Hitoshi Hamada	22 November 1944	20 December 1944	Siam Garrison Army
1	Major General Hitoshi Hamada	20 December 1944	9 July 1945	Japanese 39th Army
2	Major General Tadashi Hanaya	9 July 1945	14 July 1945	Japanese 39th Army
1	Major General Tadashi Hanaya	14 July 1945	15 August 1945	Japanese 18th Area Army
