= Attorney General Martin =

Attorney General Martin may refer to:

- Clarrie Martin (1900–1953), Attorney General of New South Wales
- Crawford Martin (1916–1972), Attorney General of Texas
- Edward T. Martin (1910–1984), Attorney General of Massachusetts for sixteen days in 1967
- Francois Xavier Martin (1762–1846), Attorney General of Louisiana
- James Martin (premier) (1820–1886), Attorney General of New South Wales
- John E. Martin (1891–1968), Attorney General of Wisconsin
- Joseph Martin (Canadian politician) (1852–1923), Attorney General of Manitoba
- Luther Martin (1748–1826), Attorney General of Maryland

== See also ==
- General Martin (disambiguation)
