= Jack Martin (basketball) =

American basketball player and coach

Biographical details
- Born: August 15, 1922; Desdemona, Texas, U.S.
- Died: October 1, 2015 (aged 93); San Antonio, Texas, U.S.

Playing career
- 1946–1948: Hardin–Simmons

Coaching career (HC unless noted)
- 1948–1951: Hardin–Simmons
- 1951–1976: Lamar

Head coaching record
- Overall: 375–323
- Tournaments: 4–4 (NCAA College Division)

Accomplishments and honors

Championships
- 3 LSC regular season (1961–1963); 2 Southland regular season (1964, 1970)

Jack Tracy Martin (August 15, 1922 – October 1, 2015) was an American basketball coach. Martin coached the Lamar Cardinals for 25 seasons in both the Lone Star Conference and the Southland Conference. Jack was a brigadier general in the Texas Air National Guard, and held a top security defense rating. He served in the Pacific throughout World War II, and was a veteran of more than 35 years in the Air Force.

== Personal life ==
Martin was born on August 15, 1922, in Desdemona, Texas, to Ernest William and Betty Myers Martin. He was raised in Burkett, Texas with his sister Lois. Following graduation from Burkett High School in 1937, he attended John Tarleton Agricultural College in Stephenville, Texas, on a basketball scholarship, participated in the ROTC program and majored in petroleum engineering. After graduation, Jack enlisted in US Army Air Corps, September, 1942; 16 months later was commissioned 2nd Lt. Martin served with distinction in the Pacific Theater during WWII, and at 22 one of the youngest B-29 pilots in the Theater.

After discharge from Ft. Sam Houston in 1946, with numerous scholarship offers, Martin chose Hardin-Simmons Baptist University, Abilene, Texas. While at Hardin-Simmons Baptist University met freshman cheerleader, Shirley Stephens, three months later, 27 June 1947, they were married. Their daughter, Sharon, arrived one year later. Martin graduated from HSU in 1948 with a Bachelor of Science degree in physical education and Mathematics. At HSU, he was an All-Conference guard for two years and captain of the basketball team in his senior year. In 1948 he was appointed, at age 25, he was appointed as HSU's youngest basketball coach. Martin earned a Master of Science Degree in education and mathematics in 1951 from HSU. After three successful coaching seasons, he accepted Head Basketball position at Lamar University, Beaumont, Texas, coaching there 25 years. At the conclusion of his coaching career, he became the director of placement at Lamar University, an administrative post he held 13 years until his retirement in 1990.

In 1948 Martin became a member of the Army National Guard in Abilene. After moving to Beaumont, the State of Texas appointed him the commander to organize the mid-country Air National Guard Squadron, Jefferson County Airport, Nederland, which became known for its efficiency and superb performances. He completed 35 years with Air Force and Texas Air National Guard.

Martin served on the NCAA Rules’ Committee six years and was treasurer for two years. He received numerous honors for basketball achievement; the most prestigious being named to the Hardin-Simmons University Athletics Hall of Fame and the Lamar University Sports Hall of Honor. He was also named to the All Border Conference Team as an Outstanding Point Guard in 1946-47 and 1947-48. Some additional recognitions include Distinguished Alumni at HSU in 1982; Induction into the Hall of Leaders at HSU in 2008, the Builders’ Association of Sabine Area Distinguished Citizen Award; Beaumont YMCA Award for Outstanding Leadership and Service to the Community, Life Membership Award in the Southwest Placement Association; Honorary Member – Delta Sigma Pi Business Fraternity; and Sons of the Republic of Texas; and Order of Daedalians, Fraternity of Military Pilots. He is listed on the Tarleton State College Wall of Honor Memorial Monument as a General Officer who served with extraordinary distinction in positions of great responsibility and as a recipient of the Distinguished Service Medal. Among other medals he received were the Legion of Merit Medal, Air Medal, and WWII Heavy Bomber Pilot Medal. He was also a faithful member of First Baptist Church in Beaumont and helped establish the Recreation and Family Life Center at the church; and a member of the South Beaumont Lions Club.

On October 1, 2015, at the age of 93, Martin died in San Antonio, Texas.

== Coaching career ==
=== Hardin Simmons ===
Immediately upon graduation from HSU in 1948, Martin was appointed head basketball coach. At age 25, he became one of the few to coach a senior-college team after never having coached in a high school or serving as an assistant, and was one of the nation's youngest coaches in a major senior college. He led the Cowboys for three seasons.

=== Lamar ===
Jack Martin was the first and longest-serving head coach in Lamar's history. He came to Lamar after coaching three seasons at his alma mater Hardin-Simmons. Martin began coaching the Cardinals as they entered the college division Lone Star Conference in 1951. Martin coached Billy Tubbs from 1955 to 1957, Tubbs would later become the first player or student to return and coach Lamar Basketball. In 1964 Lamar began its transition into Division I and the Southland Conference. The highlight of Jack Martin's career would be his 1968–1969 squad that earned a #1 national ranking in the Associated Press college division poll. Martin's squad that year won its first 15 games of the season against very strong competition. The Cardinals won their first game against Pepperdine 65–64 then traveled to Memphis and beat a strong Memphis State team, 82–69. A week later, they quieted a stunned crowd in College Station's G. Rollie White Coliseum by strumming Southwest Conference champion Texas A&M, 98–87.

With the Cardinals sitting at 6–0 and sixth-ranked University of Tulsa coming to town, most observers figured the good times were at an end. Instead, they kept rolling as Martin's flashy Cards decked Tulsa, 103–77.

"Since we had gone 8–17 the previous season, what that team did to start that year has to be one of the greatest surprises ever in Lamar basketball, at least up until that point," said Joe Lee Smith, then LU's director of sports information. "They beat a good Pepperdine team and an outstanding Memphis State team to get started, then they beat Texas A&M on the road, which was totally unexpected.

"Tulsa was ranked No. 6, but we kicked the dog out of them. That triggered a lot of national attention. It was the first year for us to be fully Division I, and after that win we started getting a few votes in the major college polls."

After the Cardinals held off Arkansas State 84–81 in Jonesboro to tie the school record of 12 straight wins, they rose to No. 18 in the United Press International major college poll. They were the only team ranked in both polls.

A few nights later, the prominent Houston Cougars, who had been to the Final Four the previous season, came to McDonald Gym. Coach Guy Lewis' Cougars had never lost to Lamar, up until this point. With 8:15 left in the game, the Cardinals trailed 56–44, but they rallied to go ahead 61–59 in the final minute. The Cougars scored in the final seconds, however, and the teams went into overtime tied at 61.

The overflow throng in McDonald Gym and those viewing the game by closed-circuit television in a nearby dining hall erupted into bedlam when forward Jim Nicholson stole the ball and went in for a layup seconds after the overtime tip-off. Then, spindly guard Earl Dow popped in a corner jumper to give the Cards a four-point lead, and they controlled the rest of overtime, winning 71–65.

On a cold February 1 night in Abilene, the record streak reached 15 games with an 85–72 victory over Abilene Christian. Two nights later on "The Stage" in Arlington, it ended with a 76–71 loss to Texas-Arlington.

== Military career ==
=== Active duty ===
Following graduation from John Tarleton Agricultural College in Stephenville, Texas, on a basketball scholarship, Jack participated in the ROTC program and majored in petroleum engineering, Jack joined the US Army Air Corps on Sept. 5, 1942 and spent 16 months training as a pilot and instructor. He was commissioned on June 27, 1944, as a 2nd Lt. He served as a pilot for the 884th Bomb Squadron, 383rd Bomb Group in the United States and for the 435th Bomb Squadron, 333rd Bomb Group, 316th Bomb Wing in the Pacific Theater of Operations (Okinawa and Guam) when the bombs were dropped on Japan in August 1945. He flew B-24 and B-29 heavy bomber aircraft, had 700 flying hours and was in command of and responsible for the plane and crew while in flight. Following the surrender of the Japanese, he transferred to and also served as controller for the 305th Fighter Control Squadron, 301st Fighter wing, Okinawa and was responsible for fighter interception for the Air Defense Command with over 1000 flying hours of P-38 and P-47 fighter aircraft.

When Japan surrendered unconditionally, ending the war in the South Pacific, large numbers of service men were left with little to do except wait for their return to the States. Martin decided to form a competition basketball team. He stated that it was great fun playing basketball and flying with those P-47 pilots even though he was called the “Throttle Jockey from Texas”! The 301st won the Championship of Okinawa Tournament and went on to win the South Pacific All-Service Championship which was in Rozalle Stadium, Manila, Capitol of the Philippine Islands on Southwest Luzon.

=== National Guard ===
After WWII, Jack continued serving his country by immediately joining the US Army National Guard in Abilene, Texas. He served with distinction as the Commander of a Field Artillery Battery. In June, 1956, at the request of the Texas Governor, Martin and 20 guardsmen started the 273rd GEEIA (Ground Electronics Engineering Installation Agency) Communications Texas Air National Guard Squadron where he served as Commander and in 1957 he obtained his BI/Top Secret Security Clearance designation and in 1969 he attended the National War College Defense Strategy Seminar and later the Command and General Staff School in Ft. Leavenworth, Kansas. Under his leadership, the squadron was known worldwide for the capabilities, initiative and professionalism in performance of both its state and federal missions including NATO Communications installations in Europe. In 1974, Martin completed the National Security Management Course from the Industrial College of the Armed Forces in Washington, D.C. After retiring from Commander of the 273rd Squadron in 1975, Col. Martin was promoted by the Governor of Texas to Brevet Brigadier General to serve in various assignments including representing the US Dept. of Defense in numerous foreign countries, Liaison for the Air Force Academy, and Civil Service Disaster Relief Operations Coordinator in Southeast Texas.

== Head coaching record ==
Record table
Season	Team	Overall	Conference	Standing	Postseason
Hardin–Simmons Cowboys (Border Conference) (1948–1951)
1948–49	Hardin–Simmons	13–10			
1949–50	Hardin–Simmons	15–10			
1950–51	Hardin Simmons	13–15	6–10	T–6th	
Hardin–Simmons:		41–35			
Lamar Cardinals (Lone Star Conference) (1951–1963)
1951–52	Lamar	7–16	1–9	6th	
1952–53	Lamar	11–12	4–6	4th	
1953–54	Lamar	13–11	4–6	4th	
1954–55	Lamar	11–14	5–7	5th	
1955–56	Lamar	12–12	7–5	4th	
1956–57	Lamar	14–11	5–9	5th	
1957–58	Lamar	10–12	3–11	8th	
1958–59	Lamar	17–7	9–5	2nd	
1959–60	Lamar	18–9	11–3	3rd	NCAA College Division Regional Third Place
1960–61	Lamar	19–8	12–2	1st	
1961–62	Lamar	20–8	13–1	1st	NCAA College Division Regional Third Place
1962–63	Lamar	22–5	12–2	1st	NCAA College Division Regional Runner-up
Lamar Cardinals (Southland Conference) (1963–1976)
1963–64	Lamar	19–6	7–1	1st	NCAA College Division Regional Third Place
1964–65	Lamar	18–6	5–3	3rd	
1965–66	Lamar	17–9	4–4	2nd	NCAA College Division Regional Third Place
1966–67	Lamar	5–19	0–8	5th	
1967–68	Lamar	8–17	3–5	4th	
1968–69	Lamar	20–4	6–2	2nd	
1969–70	Lamar	15–9	7–1	1st	
1970–71	Lamar	11–13	5–3	2nd	
1971–72	Lamar	13–13	7–1	2nd	
1972–73	Lamar	11–13	6–6	4th	
1973–74	Lamar	6–19	0–4	3rd	
1974–75	Lamar	7–16	4–4	3rd	
1975–76	Lamar	10–14	6–4	3rd	
Lamar:		334–283	146–112		
Total:		375–323			
National champion Postseason invitational champion Conference regular season champion Conference regular season and conference tournament champion Division regular season champion Division regular season and conference tournament champion Conference tournament champion
