= Canton Operation =

Campaign of the Second Sino-Japanese War

Coordinates: 23.09°N 113.30°E

- Part of the Second Sino-Japanese War and the interwar period
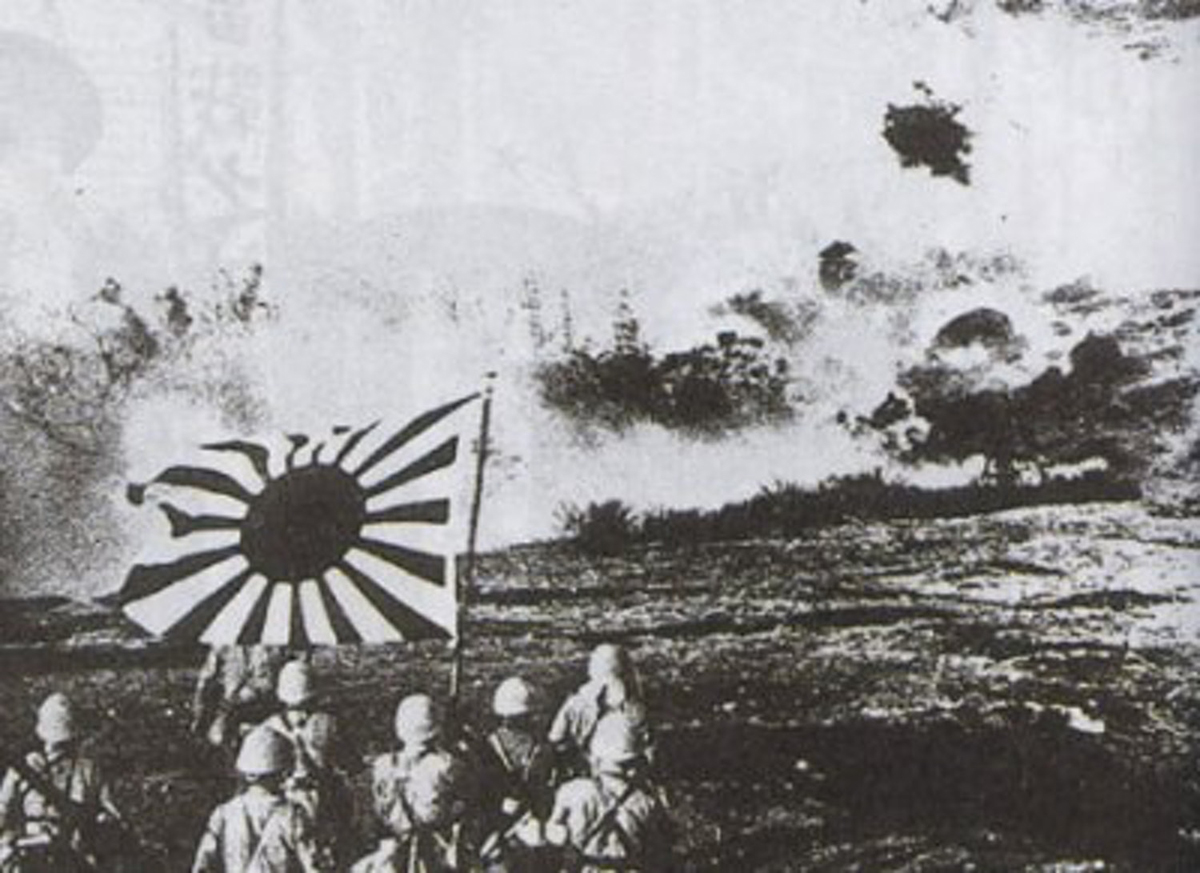
- Japanese naval landing forces blasting Chinese pillbox and marching with the naval flag
Date	12 October – 29 October 1938 (2 weeks and 3 days)
Location	Canton city in Guangdong province, Republic of China
Result	Japanese victory

Belligerents
Japan	China

Commanders and leaders
(Empire of Japan) Lt. Gen. Motoo Furusho, (Empire of Japan) Adm. Koichi Shiozawa	(Republic of China (1912–1949)) Yu Han-mou

Units involved
Imperial Japanese Army; (Empire of Japan) 21st Army: 5th Division; 18th Division; 104th Division; 4th Air Division; Imperial Japanese Navy; (Empire of Japan) 5th Fleet: 9th, 10th and 8th Cruiser Divisions; 2nd and 5th Torpedo Squadrons; 1st and 2nd Carrier Divisions; Seaplane tenders Chitose and Kamikawa Maru; 3rd Destroyer Division; 1st Gunboat Division	(Republic of China (1912–1949)) National Revolutionary Army; (Republic of China (1912–1949)) 12th Army Group: 62nd Army; 63rd Army; 64th Army; 65th Army; 93rd Division (under the 66th Army); 20th Independent Brigade; 9th Independent Brigade; 2nd Independent Regiment; Humen Fortress Command

Strength
Imperial Japanese Army: 70,000 men; 27,000 horses; Army aircraft: 4 direct support aircraft; 24 fighters; 27 light bombers; Total aircraft: 55: Imperial Japanese Navy: 2 aircraft carriers; 1 light aircraft carrier; 1 heavy cruiser; 8 light cruisers; 23 destroyers; 2 seaplane tenders; 3 gunboats; 6 minesweepers; Navy aircraft: 39 carrier fighters; 45 carrier bombers; 43 carrier torpedo bombers; 6 naval reconnaissance aircraft; 9 medium bombers; Total aircraft: 142: Transports: 80 daihatsu; 180 shohatsu; 300 motorized sampans; 250 barges; 200-250 fishing ships; 10 tugboats; 20-25 sea trucks; 10 launches	80,000 men

Casualties and losses
Official Japanese war records claim: 173 killed; 493 wounded; 1,264 sick; Total casualties: 1,930 1,069 horses killed, wounded or sick 5 aircraft	Chinese claim: (Note: The statistics of casualties for the 453rd brigade of the 151st division, 457th brigade of the 153rd division, 943rd regiment of the 158th division, and 627th regiment of the 9th independent brigade in guerilla actions are not included.; The losses of security and police personnels and local militias are not included.): 2,954 killed; 5,645 wounded; 2,643 missing; Total casualties: 11,242 Official Japanese war records claim 1,340 captured. Another official Japanese military source claimed 5,203 Chinese troops killed. Official Japanese war records claim: 2,371 rifles; 214 heavy and light machineguns; 134 artillery pieces; 53 coastal artillery pieces; 21 tanks and light armored vehicles; 151 vehicles

The Canton Operation (Chinese: 廣州戰役; pinyin: Guǎngzhōu Zhànyì) was part of a campaign by Japan during the Second Sino-Japanese War to blockade China to prevent it from communicating with the outside world and importing needed arms and materials. Control of Guangzhou (Canton) and the Pearl River Delta would provide a base to make the blockade of Guangdong province more effective by seizing southern China's major port and isolate the British port of British Hong Kong.

== Background ==
By the end of 1937, south China was crucial to the Republic of China as a means of maintaining contact with the outside world. Guangzhou and Hong Kong served as vital centers of transportation and international aid to Chiang Kai-Shek. Approximately 80 percent of supplies from abroad to the Chinese forces in the interior passed through Guangzhou. Imperial General Headquarters believed that a blockade of Guangdong province would deprive China of essential war material and the ability to prolong the war.

In 1936 the Hankow-Canton (Hankou-Guangzhou) railway was completed. With the Kowloon-Canton (Hong Kong-Guangzhou) railway, this formed a rapid all-rail link from south China to central and northern China. For the first sixteen months of the war about 60,000 tons of goods transited per month through the port of Hong Kong. The central government also reported the import of 1.5 million gallons of gasoline (4,100 tons) through Hong Kong in 1938. More than 700,000 tons of goods would eventually reach Hankou using the new railway.

For comparison, the Soviet Union was more willing to provide direct military support to prolong the war. In addition to the Sino-Soviet Non-Aggression Pact signed in August 1937, a barter agreement was negotiated to trade munitions for strategic materials such as tungsten and antimony. Starting in 1937 Soviet war material was transported through Xinjiang (Sinkiang) to Lanzhou (Lanchow) using 20,000 camels. Chinese raw materials would travel back the same way or via Hong Kong to Vladivostok. By 1940, 50,000 camels and hundreds of trucks were transporting 2,000-3,000 tons of Soviet war material per month into China.

Japanese planning for operations began in early November 1937. The objectives of the blockade could be achieved by seizing a portion of Daya Bay and conducting air operations from there. In December 1937, the 5th Army with the 11th Division, the Formosa Mixed Brigade and the 4th Air Brigade were activated in Formosa under the command Lt. Gen. Motoo Furusho to accomplish this objective. Due to the proximity of Daya Bay to Hongkong, the Japanese Government feared that trouble might break out between Britain and Japan. The operation was subsequently suspended and the 5th Army was deactivated. By June 1938, the Battle of Wuhan caused the Imperial General Headquarters to realize that it could not localize the fighting. Imperial General Headquarters reversed policy and began preparations to capture Guangzhou and expedite the settlement of the war.

== Prelude ==
=== Pre-emptive strikes ===
While the full-scale War of Resistance-World War II raged at the Battle of Shanghai and Battle of Nanking, pressing demands for aerial support at the Battle of Taiyuan in the northern front and Canton in the southern front, forced the Nationalist Air Force of China to split the 28th PS, 5th PG based at Jurong Airbase in the Nanking defense sector into two smaller squadrons, dispatching them with Lt. Arthur Chin leading half of the squadron towards Canton, and Capt. Chan Kee-Wong leading the other half to Taiyuan. On 27 September 1937, 28th PS commander Lt. Arthur Chin led four Hawk IIs out of Shaoguan Airbase while 29th PS commander Lt. Chen Shun-Nan led three Hawk IIIs out from Tianhe Airbase on an intercept of IJNAF G3M bombers sent to attack the Canton-Hankow railway infrastructure; the two flights of Hawks attacked the Japanese bombers over Canton, claiming at least two kills, with one G3M streaming fuel, where it ditched off the coast of Swatow, and the crew rescued by a British freighter, with one of the gunners dying of his battle wounds. In October 1937, the Chinese government ordered 36 Gloster Gladiator Mk.I fighters whose performance and firepower well-exceeds that of the Hawk IIs and IIIs; most of these became the frontline fighter aircraft of the Chinese Air Force in the Canton defense sector as the war raged into 1938.

On 23 February 1938 (some sources date 24 February), Capt. John Huang Xinrui (like Arthur Chin, a Chinese-American volunteer pilot for the Chinese Air Force) commanded the renewed 29th PS now equipped with the new Gloster Gladiator fighters, led nine of his squadron's British-made Gladiators out of Nanxiong Airbase to its first-ever aerial-combat baptism of fire over Canton, along with three 28th PS Gladiators, they intercepted thirteen Nakajima E8N fighter-attack seaplanes from the seaplane tenders Notoro Maru and Kinugasa Maru; unfortunately the Chinese pilots efforts were severely thwarted in the ensuing battle, as most of the machine guns on the Gladiators jammed, yet despite the greatly reduced firepower from the Gladiators, five of the E8N were still shot-up enough to go down as confirmed kills by Capt. Huang and the other pilots hitting the Japanese planes with only one, two or three working guns (out of four) per Gladiator. Arthur Chin revealed later that the cause of the jamming of the Gladiator's machine guns were the result of defective Belgian-made ammunition rounds. Tragically, the bad ammunition led to fatal consequences, as the Gladiator pilots Lt. Xie Chuanhe (Hsieh Chuan-ho) and his wingman Lt. Yang Rutong both tailed and targeted the E8Ns, only to be stymied with their Gladiator's inoperable weapons, with Lt. Yang killed in a burst of machine gun fire from the counter-attacking E8N; Lt. Chen Qiwei (Chen Chi-wei) was lost under similar circumstances.

=== 4th War Area Army ===
The 4th War Area Army under the command of He Yingqin in 1938 was assigned to the defense of south China. General Yu Hanmou was in command of the 12th Army Group defending Guangdong province. Eight divisions and two brigades of regular army troops were deployed in the vicinity of Guangzhou. Another five divisions of regular army troops were deployed in Fujian province. The 4th War Area Army totalled about 110,000 regular army troops. Most regular army units in Guangxi province and four divisions from Guangdong had been transferred north to participate in the Battle of Wuhan.

In addition to regular army troops, two militia divisions were deployed in the vicinity of Guangzhou and the Guanxi militia consisted of five militia divisions in Guangxi province. The militia divisions would generally be recruited from the local civilian population and disbanded as the army moved through new areas. These divisions were generally employed for security, supply transportation and reconnaissance.

The main strength of the Chinese forces in Guangdong were concentrated in Guangzhou and to the immediate east of the city. Other elements defended Chaozhou and western Guangdong. Chinese defensive installations included the Humen fortress overlooking the mouth of the Pearl River and three defensive lines near Daya Bay. Three batteries of four three-inch guns, a battery of three 120mm guns and Soviet 37mm guns were stationed in Guangzhou for anti-air defense.

=== Japanese blockade ===
Prior to the Canton Operation, the Imperial Japanese Navy conducted an aerial and naval interdiction campaign against China's communication lines to neighbouring regions. Japan believed that the blockade would hasten the end of the war. Disruption of the Chinese logistics network was the primary Japanese objective in Guangdong province from August 1937 until October 1938.

The 5th Fleet's 10th Division blockaded and patrolled the coast from Haimenchen, Zhejiang to Shantou and the 5th Destroyer Squadron patrolled the coast south of Shantou. Occasionally Japanese units from the Marianas were deployed in support of coastal blockade operations in south China. These usually consisted of cruisers accompanied by a flotilla of destroyers. One or two aircraft carriers and fleet auxiliaries would also be on station. Naval interdictions focused on stopping junks ferrying military supplies from Hong Kong to coastal China. The first recorded attack occurred in September 1937 when eleven junks were sunk by a Japanese submarine. Although the Japanese were able to blockade Chinese shipping and ports, foreign shipping could still enter and depart from Hong Kong. The central government had set up Hong Kong as a warehouse for munitions and supplies to pass through.

Aerial interdictions directed bombers against Chinese railway bridges and trains in Guangdong. Starting from October 1937, the Japanese launched air raids against the Sunning railway. The attacks targeted government facilities and bridges in Jiangmen (Kongmoon) and towns along the railway. By 1938, airstrikes against the Kowloon-Canton railway became a common occurrence with damaged trains found periodically along the railway. An air defense early warning system was established to shunt trains during air raids into forested areas that provided overhead concealment. In May 1938 the Colonial Office and the Foreign Office approved a Chinese request to construct and operate a locomotive repair yard within the New Territories to keep the railway operational. Airstrikes conducted against rail facilities in Guangzhou were designed to interrupt rail supplies from Hong Kong so that Japan would not be required to commit to land operations in south China. However, the air raids had failed to severely impede railway operations or stop supplies moving through Hunan or Guangxi.

The blockade in south China also included attacks against aircraft flying out of Hong Kong. In November 1937, a Royal Navy aircraft from HMS Eagle encountered Japanese naval anti-aircraft fire off the coast of Hong Kong. In December 1937, fifteen Japanese bombers overflew Lantau Island and the Taikoo docks. In August 1938 Japanese naval aircraft shot down a China National Aviation Corporation passenger plane and another two passenger planes from the Eurasia Aviation Corporation were shot down the following month.

In addition to airstrikes against military targets, the Japanese conducted politically motivated terror bombing in Guangzhou. Bombing of Guangzhou intensified starting from May to June 1938 with the employment of incendiary munitions and low-level strafing attacks against ships. The Imperial Japanese Navy Air Service, operating from bases in Formosa and the aircraft carrier Kaga conducted about 400 airstrikes during this period and continued into July. By the end of summer only 600,000 of the original 1.3 million residents remained in the city of Guangzhou. From August 1937 to October 1938 casualties in Guangzhou were estimated at 6,000 killed and 8,000 injured.

== Aftermath ==
After the capture of Guangzhou, Japanese forces conducted mopping-up operations at the surrounding areas, suffering at least 40 killed and 103 wounded against Nationalist Chinese forces from early November to early December 1938.

== See also ==
- Order of battle for Guangdong Operation
