= Aketo Nakamura =

Japanese general (1889–1966)

- 中村 明人
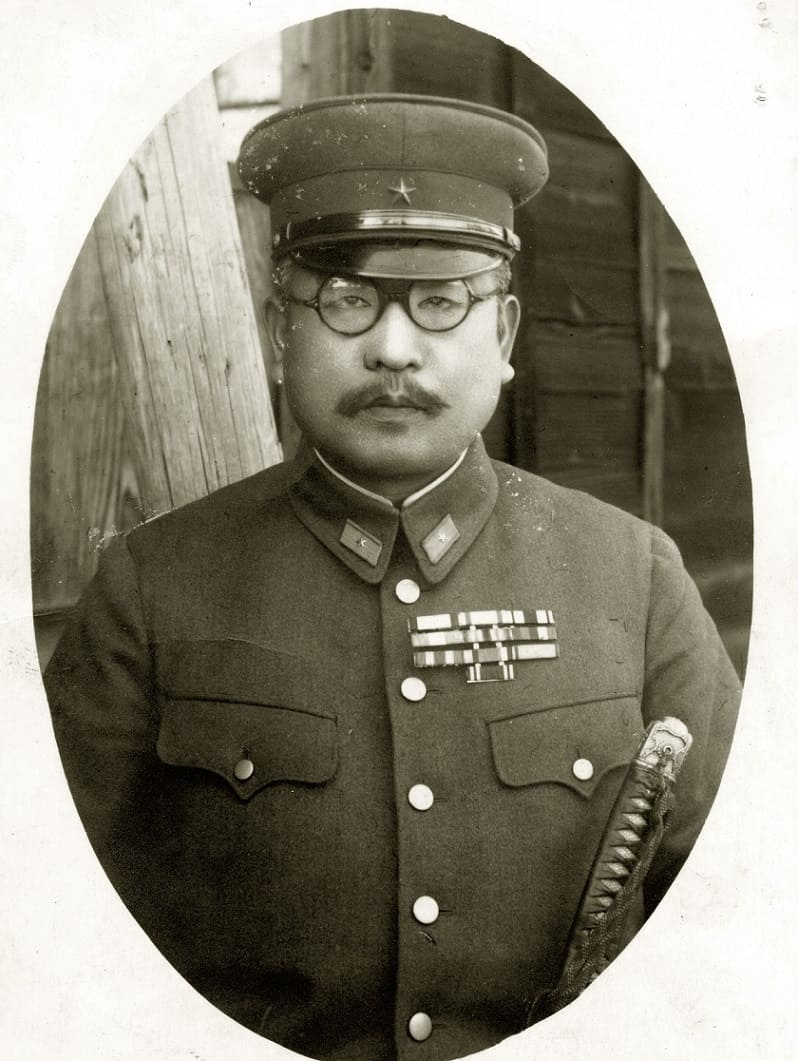
- Born: April 11, 1889; Nagoya, Japan
- Died: September 12, 1966 (aged 77)
- Education: Imperial Japanese Army Academy
- Military career
- Allegiance: Empire of Japan
- Branch: Imperial Japanese Army
- Rank: Lieutenant general
- Units: Siam Garrison Command; IJA 39th Army; IJA 18th Area Army
- Commands: IJA 5th Division
- Conflicts: World War II; Japanese invasion of French Indochina

Aketo Nakamura (中村 明人, Nakamura Aketo; 11 April 1889 – 12 September 1966) was a Japanese lieutenant general during World War II.

== Biography ==
In 1910, Nakamura entered the Imperial Japanese Army Academy.

In 1940, he participated in the Japanese invasion of French Indochina at the head of the IJA 5th Division.

On January 4, 1943, he received the post of General Officer in Thailand, first called the Siam Garrison Command, then the IJA 39th Army, and finally on July 7, 1945 the IJA 18th Area Army. At the end of the war, he surrendered his troops to the allies and took his retirement in 1946.
