= Motoo Furushō =

Japanese general (1882-1940)

- 古荘 幹郎
- Born: 28 September 1884; Kumamoto prefecture, Japan
- Died: 21 July 1940 (aged 55); Tokyo, Japan
- Military career
- Allegiance: Empire of Japan
- Branch: Imperial Japanese Army
- Service years: 1902–1940
- Rank: General
- Commands: 11th Division; Taiwan Army of Japan; Fifth Army; Twenty-First Army
- Conflicts: Russo-Japanese War; Second Sino-Japanese War
- Other work: Vice Minister of War

Motoo Furushō (古荘 幹郎, Furushō Motoo; 14 September 1882 – 21 July 1940) was a lieutenant general of the Imperial Japanese Army and commander of the Japanese Twenty-First Army in 1938 during the Canton Operation.

== Biography ==
A native of Kumamoto prefecture, Furushō attended military preparatory schools as a youth, and graduated from the 14th class of the Imperial Japanese Army Academy in 1902. The following year, he was commissioned as a second lieutenant in the Imperial Guards. He was in combat during the Russo-Japanese War in 1904-1905 with the 4th Guards Infantry Regiment.

After the war, Furushō returned to Army Staff College and graduated from the 21st class in 1909. After graduation, he was assigned a number of administrative positions within the Imperial Japanese Army General Staff, and did a tour of duty as a military attaché to Germany, and another tour as aide-de-camp to Field Marshal Yamagata Aritomo.

After serving as an instructor at the Army War College from 1921 to 1923, Furushō became Chief of the 1st Section (Organization & Mobilization), 1st Bureau, Imperial Japanese Army General Staff from 1923 to 1925. He was then given command of the 2nd Imperial Guards Regiment, continuing his long association with the Imperial Guard, from 1925 to 1927.

After serving with the Ministry of War from 1927 to 1928, Furushō was promoted to major general and given command of the IJA 2nd Infantry Brigade. He returned to various administrative positions within the General Staff from 1929 to 1934.

Promoted to lieutenant general in 1933, Furushō took command of the IJA 11th Division in 1934. He subsequently served as Vice Minister of War from 1935 to 1936.

In 1936, Furushō became Head of Army Aeronautical Department, but in 1937 was appointed Commander in Chief of the Taiwan Army District.

With the start of the Second Sino-Japanese War in 1937, Furushō went to China as commander of the Japanese Fifth Army. In 1938, he became commander of the Japanese Twenty-First Army. He returned to Japan in 1938, was promoted to full general and served as a member of the Supreme War Council until his death in 1940. His grave is at Tama Cemetery, in Fuchū, Tokyo.
