= Nobutake Kondō =

Japanese admiral (1886–1953)

- 近藤 信竹
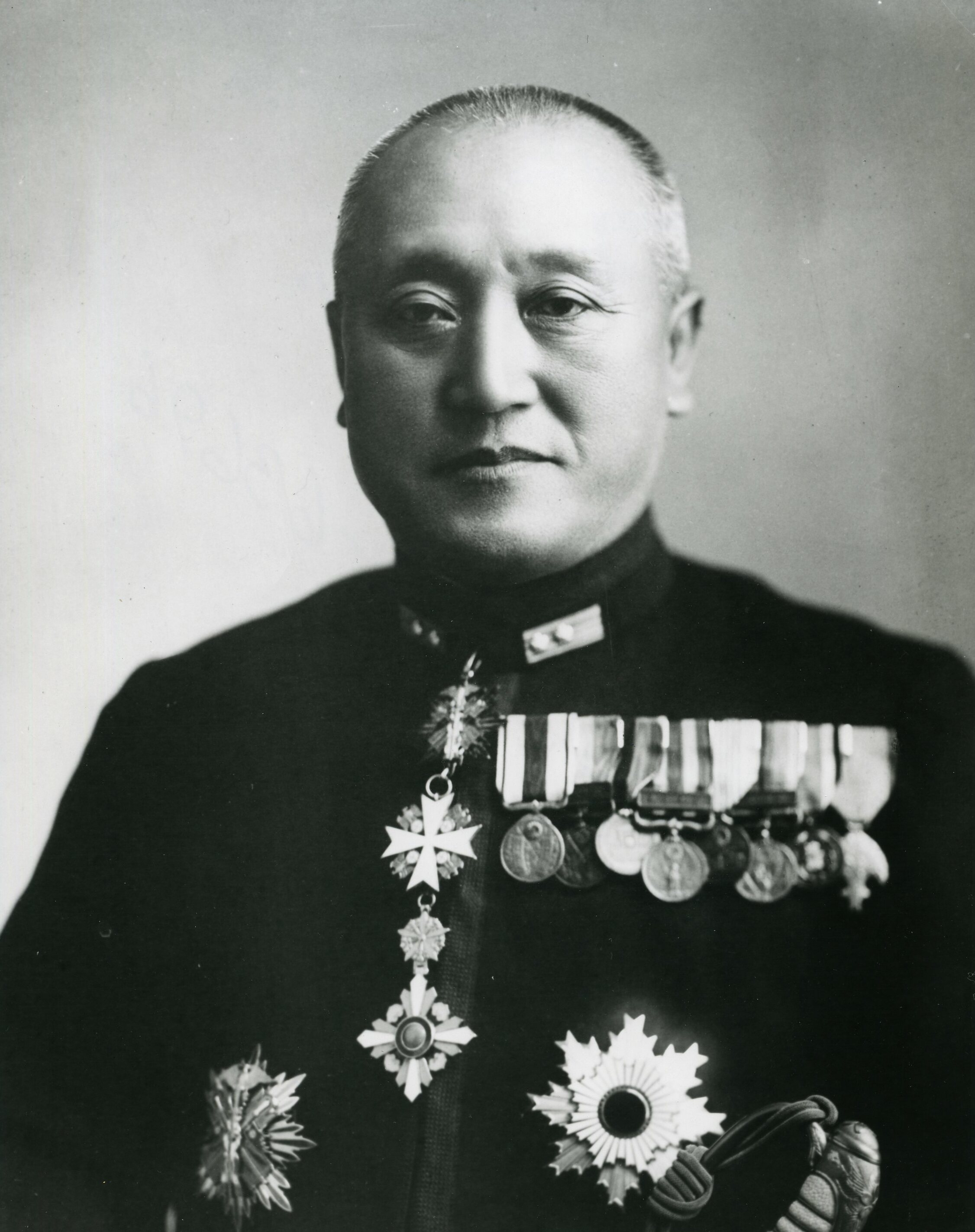
- Born: 25 September 1886; Osaka, Kansai, Empire of Japan
- Died: 19 February 1953 (aged 66); Setagaya, Tokyo, Japan
- Military career
- Allegiance: Japan
- Branch: Imperial Japanese Navy
- Service years: 1907–1945
- Rank: Admiral
- Commands: Kako, Kongō, Naval Operations Bureau, 5th Fleet, Vice-chief of Navy General Staff, 2nd Fleet, Naval Councillor, China Area Fleet
- Conflicts: Second Sino-Japanese War; Hainan Island Operation; Swatow Operation; World War II; Pacific War; Malayan campaign; Dutch East Indies campaign; Indian Ocean raid; Battle of Midway; New Guinea campaign; Guadalcanal campaign; Solomon Islands campaign
- Awards: Order of the Rising Sun (2nd class); Order of the Golden Kite (1st class and 3rd class); Order of the Sacred Treasure (3rd class)
- Other work: Supreme War Council

Nobutake Kondō (近藤 信竹; 25 September 1886 – 19 February 1953) was an admiral in the Imperial Japanese Navy during World War II. As commander of IJN 2nd Fleet, the Navy's principal detached force for independent operations, Kondō was regarded as second in importance only to Admiral Isoroku Yamamoto.

== Biography ==
=== Early life and career ===
Kondō was a native of Osaka. He graduated at the head of his class of 172 cadets from the 35th session of the Imperial Japanese Navy Academy in 1907. As a midshipman he served on the cruiser Itsukushima and battleship Mikasa. After his commissioning as ensign, he was assigned to the cruiser Aso, destroyer Kisaragi and battleship Kongō. From 1912 to 1913 he was a naval attaché to the United Kingdom. After his return to Japan, he served briefly on the Fusō, then in a number of staff positions throughout World War I. From 1916 to 1917 he was chief Gunnery Officer on Akitsushima.

After the end of the war, Kondō attended the Naval Staff College, and was promoted to lieutenant commander on 1 December 1919.

From 1920 to 1923, Kondō was stationed in Germany, as part of the Japanese delegation to confirm Germany's adherence to the provision of the Treaty of Versailles. On his return to Japan, he was stationed for six months on the battleship Mutsu, and promoted to commander on 1 December 1923. From 1924 to 1925, he was an aide-de-camp to Crown Prince Hirohito. On completion of this task, he became an instructor at the Imperial Japanese Navy Academy and was promoted to captain. He subsequently served in a number of positions on the Imperial Japanese Navy General Staff. He was captain of the Kako from 1929 to 1930 and of the battleship Kongō from 1932 to 1933.

Kondō was promoted to rear admiral on 15 November 1933, Chief of Staff of the Combined Fleet in 1935, and vice admiral on 15 November 1937.

=== World War II ===
After the start of the Second Sino-Japanese War, Kondō commanded the IJN 5th Fleet in the Hainan Island Operation and Swatow Operation off of southern China.

At the time of the attack on Pearl Harbor, Kondō commanded the IJN 2nd Fleet, participating in the invasions of Malaya, the Philippines and the Dutch East Indies. He was overall commander for the Indian Ocean Raid. During the Battle of Midway, he commanded the Midway Occupation Force and Covering Group. Subsequently, his forces played a leading role during the Guadalcanal campaign, seeing combat in the Battle of the Eastern Solomons (23–25 August 1942) and the Battle of the Santa Cruz Islands (26–27 October).

In the second night action of the Naval Battle of Guadalcanal on 14/15 November 1942, Kondō personally led the battleship Kirishima along with cruisers Atago, Takao, Nagara, and Sendai, in what was to have been a decisive attack to eliminate the threat from Henderson Field through a massive nocturnal shelling. Instead, Kondō was confronted by an American task force with battleships USS Washington and USS South Dakota, and was defeated, losing Kirishima. This defeat marked a turning point of the entire Guadalcanal campaign.

Kondō was apparently tainted by the Guadalcanal failures, and was soon removed from seagoing commands, or indeed any positions of real authority. Yamamoto's demotion of Kondō was nonetheless less harsh than that of his predecessor, Hiroaki Abe, due to Imperial Navy culture and politics. Kondō, who also held the position of second in command of the Combined Fleet, was a member of the upper staff and "battleship clique" of the Imperial Navy while Abe was a career destroyer specialist. Kondō was not reprimanded or reassigned but instead was left in command of one of the large ship fleets based at Truk.

Kondō was appointed Deputy Commander of the Combined Fleet in October 1942 and was promoted to full admiral on 29 April 1943. He became Commander in Chief of the China Area Fleet from December 1943 until May 1945, when he was appointed to the Supreme War Council.

== Notes ==
Military offices
Preceded by Yoshida Zengo	Combined Fleet & 1st Fleet; Chief-of-staff; 15 March 1935 – 15 November 1935	Succeeded by Nomura Naokuni
Preceded by Shiozawa Kōichi	5th Fleet; Commander-in-chief; 15 December 1938 – 29 September 1939	Succeeded by Takasu Shirō
Preceded by Koga Mineichi	Navy General Staff; Vice-Chairman; 21 October 1939 – 1 September 1941	Succeeded by Itō Seiichi
Preceded by Koga Mineichi	2nd Fleet; Commander-in-chief; 1 September 1941 – 9 August 1943	Succeeded by Kurita Takeo
Preceded by Yoshida Zengo	China Area Fleet; Commander-in-chief; 1 December 1943 – 15 May 1945	Succeeded by Fukuda Ryōzō
