= Maurice Martin (general) =

Maurice Pierre Auguste Martin (1878–1952) was a French soldier and general in the French army during World War II.

He is also notable for requesting that the United States government freeze all Japanese assets in the United States, after Japan invaded French Indochina in September 1940.

== Battles ==
- Pacific War
- Japanese invasion of French Indochina
