= Twenty-First Army (Japan) =

Infantry of the Imperial Japanese Army

Japanese Twenty-First Army
- Active: September 19, 1938 - February 19, 1940
- Country: Empire of Japan
- Branch: Imperial Japanese Army
- Type: Infantry
- Role: Corps
- Garrison/HQ: Guangzhou
- Nickname(s): none
- Engagements: Canton Operation

The Japanese 21st Army (第21軍, Dai-nijyūichi gun) was an army of the Imperial Japanese Army during the Second Sino-Japanese War.

== History ==
The Japanese 21st Army was formed on September 19, 1938 under the Imperial General Headquarters. It was transferred to the control of the China Expeditionary Army on September 23, 1939 and assigned the primary role in the Canton Operation (the invasion of Guangdong Province in southern China), together with the Imperial Japanese Navy’s 5th Fleet.

On October 12, the 18th and 104th Divisions landed, followed by command units the following day. By October 21, the provincial capital of Guangzhou was under Japanese control. The IJA 5th Division continued to advance up the Pearl River and by November 5 had taken the city of Foshan. By the end of November, the entire province was under Japanese control.

The Japanese 21st Army was disbanded on February 9, 1940. Its command staff joined the staff of the Japanese Southern China Area Army, and its divisions were reassigned to other areas.

== List of Commanders ==
=== Commanding officer ===
	Name	From	To
1	General Motoo Furushō	8 September 1938	9 November 1938
2	General Rikichi Andō	9 November 1938	10 February 1940

=== Chief of Staff ===
	Name	From	To
1	Lieutenant General Hisaichi Tanaka	8 September 1938	1 August 1939
2	Lieutenant General Yuitsu Tsuchihashi	1 August 1939	1 December 1939
3	Major General Hiroshi Konpon	1 December 1939	10 February 1940

== Organization (as of February 9, 1940) ==
21st Army

- 5th Infantry Division
  - 9th Infantry Brigade
    - 11th Infantry Regiment
    - 41st Infantry Regiment
  - 21st Infantry Brigade
    - 21st Infantry Regiment
    - 42nd Infantry Regiment
  - 5th Mountain Artillery Regiment
  - 5th Cavalry Regiment
  - 5th Engineer Regiment
  - 5th Transport Regiment
- 18th Infantry Division
  - 23rd Infantry Brigade
    - 55th Infantry Regiment
    - 56th Infantry Regiment
  - 35th Infantry Brigade
    - 114th Infantry Regiment
    - 124th Infantry Regiment
  - 22nd Cavalry Battalion
  - 18th Mountain Artillery Regiment
  - 12th Military Engineer Regiment
  - 12th Transport Regiment
- 38th Infantry Division
    - 228th Infantry Regiment
    - 229th Infantry Regiment
    - 230th Infantry Regiment
- 104th Infantry Division
  - 107th Infantry Brigade
    - 108th Infantry Regiment
    - 170th Infantry Regiment
  - 132nd Infantry Brigade
    - 137th Infantry Regiment
    - 161st Infantry Regiment
  - 104th Field Artillery Regiment
  - 104th Cavalry Regiment
  - 104th Engineer Regiment
  - 104th Transport Regiment
- 106th Infantry Division
- 111th Mountain Artillery Regiment
- 10th Independent Mountain Artillery Regiment
- 15th Independent Military Engineer Regiment
