= Rikichi Andō =

Japanese officer and war criminal (1884–1946)

- 安藤 利吉

19th Governor General of Taiwan
- In office 30 December 1944 – 25 October 1945
- Monarch: Shōwa
- Preceded by: Kiyoshi Hasegawa
- Succeeded by: Chen Yi (as Chief Executive of Taiwan Province)

Personal details
- Born: 3 April 1884 Sendai, Miyagi, Japan
- Died: 19 April 1946 (aged 62) Tilanqiao Prison, Shanghai, China

Military service
- Allegiance: Empire of Japan
- Branch/service: Imperial Japanese Army
- Years of service: 1904–1945
- Rank: General
- Commands: Twenty-First Army; Southern China Area Army; Taiwan Army of Japan; Tenth Area Army
- Battles/wars: Second Sino-Japanese War; Battle of South Guangxi; Winter Offensive (1939–1940)

Rikichi Andō (安藤 利吉, Andō Rikichi; 3 April 1884 – 19 April 1946) was a general in the Imperial Japanese Army and 19th and final Japanese Governor-General of Taiwan from 30 December 1944 to October 1945.

== Biography ==
=== Early career ===
Andō was a native of Miyagi Prefecture. He served as an instructor at the Army War College from 1924 to 1925. From 1925 to 1927, he was sent to British India as a military attaché, and on his return to Japan, served in a number of staff assignments under the Imperial Japanese Army General Staff. He returned to the field in 1928 as commander of the 13th Infantry Regiment, and was promoted to Chief of Staff of the IJA 5th Division in 1930.

From 1931 to 1932, Andō returned to the General Staff, where he was Chief of Military Administration Section, Military Affairs Bureau. He was appointed military attaché to the United Kingdom from 1932 to 1934. After his return to Japan, he became Commandant of the Toyoma Army Infantry School, and subsequently commander of the 5th Independent Garrison Unit. From 1937 to 1938, he was Deputy Inspector-General of Military Training.

=== The man who started the Pacific War ===
With the outbreak of the Second Sino-Japanese War, Andō was given a field assignment as commander of his old unit, the IJA 5th Division in 1938. Later that year, he was promoted to commander in chief of the IJA 21st Army in China, which became part of the Japanese Southern China Area Army in 1939. The Japanese Southern China Area Army was largely a garrison force controlling Japanese-occupied Guangdong and Guangxi Provinces.

In the midst of diplomatic negotiations between Japan and its ally, Vichy France, over access to air strips and seaports in French Indochina, Andō took independent initiative and ordered his forces across the border, without prior authorization from the government in Tokyo. Japanese military and political leaders were outraged; however, as the invasion had already occurred, military and political considerations meant that the Japanese government had no choice but to follow through. The unauthorized invasion of French Indochina created a diplomatic confrontation with the West and the imposition of an American oil embargo against Japan. Andō was recalled to Tokyo on 9 February 1941 and forced into retirement as punishment.

=== Taiwan ===
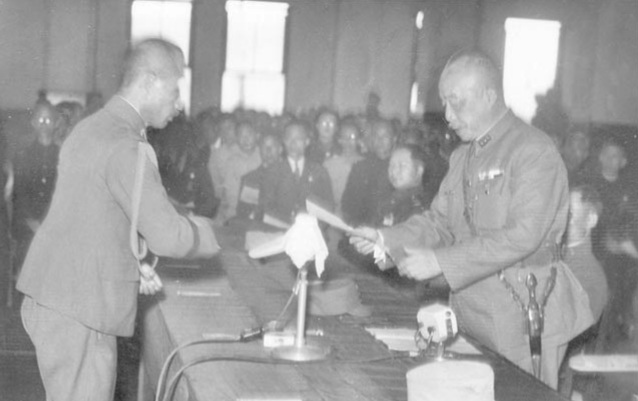
Chen Yi (right) accepting the receipt of Order No. 1 signed by Rikichi Andō (left), the last Japanese Governor-General of Taiwan, in Taipei City Hall.

In the fall of 1941, Andō was recalled to service, promoted to full general, and given command of the Japanese Tenth Area Army in Taiwan. The 10th Area Army was essentially the "Taiwan Army", as it had no additional combat forces assigned to it, and served as a garrison force for the island. Ando became the final Japanese Governor-General of Taiwan on 30 December 1944. After the end of the war, the 10th Area Army was disbanded in September 1945.

Arrested by Chinese authorities and charged with war crimes from his tenure in China, Andō committed suicide by taking poison while in prison in Shanghai before he could go to trial.

== See also ==
- Taiwan under Japanese rule
