= 170th Infantry Regiment (Imperial Japanese Army) =

- Active: World War II
- Branch: Infantry
- Part of: Twenty-First st Army
- Engagements: Second Sino-Japanese War

The 170th Infantry Regiment was an infantry regiment in the Imperial Japanese Army. The regiment was attached to the 21st Army until 1940. The regiment participated during the Second Sino-Japanese War and World War II. In 1941, it formed the basis of the 21st Independent Mixed Brigade.

== Organization ==
- 1st Battalion
- 2nd Battalion
- 3rd Battalion
