= Japanese invasion of French Indochina =

1940 World War II conflict

- Part of French Indochina in World War II and World War II
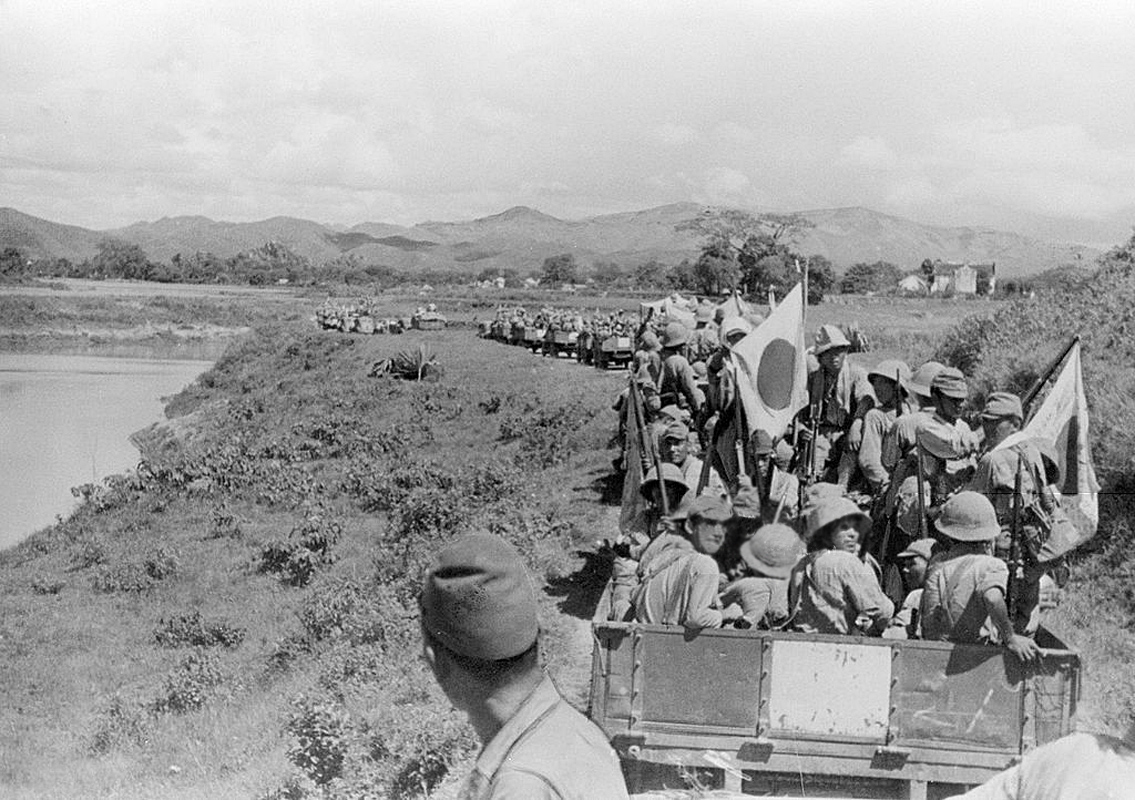
- Imperial Japanese Army soldiers advance to Lang Son, French Indochina, in September 1940
Date	22–26 September 1940 (4 days)
Location	French Indochina
Result	Japanese victory
Territorial changes	Japanese occupation of French Indochina from Lạng Sơn province

Belligerents
Japan	Vichy France: French Indochina	Vietnamese Nationalist Party: Kiến Quốc Army

Commanders and leaders
(Empire of Japan) Aketo Nakamura (Empire of Japan) Takuma Nishimura	(Vichy France) Jean Decoux (Vichy France) Maurice Martin	Cường Để; Trần Trung Lập (executed); Đoàn Kiểm Điểm (executed)

Casualties and losses
~100 according to sources Japanese claim : 67 killed and 205 wounded. According to the detailed battle report of the 5th Division (September 22 to September 29, 1940) : 71 killed, 230 wounded.	~900 according to sources Japanese claim : 408 killed and 2,216 captured (French and Vietnamese troops)	2 battalions

French Indochina (dark red) within the projected Japanese sphere of influence during World War II (light red), as it appeared by late 1942.

The Japanese invasion of French Indochina (仏印進駐, Futsu-in shinchū) (French: Invasion japonaise de l'Indochine) was a short undeclared military confrontation between Japan and Vichy France in northern French Indochina. Fighting lasted from 22 to 26 September 1940; the same time as the Battle of South Guangxi in the Sino-Japanese War.

An important objective of the Japanese was to prevent China from importing arms and fuel through French Indochina along the Kunming–Haiphong railway, from the Indochinese port of Haiphong, through the capital of Hanoi to the Chinese city of Kunming in Yunnan.

Although an agreement ceasing supply of arms had been reached between the French and Japanese governments prior to the outbreak of fighting, Japan invaded Indochina. As per the prior agreement, Japan was allowed to occupy Tonkin in northern Indochina, and thus effectively blockade China, but later expanded its occupation to the whole of Indochina.

== Background ==
The occupation of Indochina also fit into Japan's long-term plans. Japanese leaders then dreamed of creating what they called a Greater East Asia Co-Prosperity Sphere, an economic and political coalition of Asian nations tied to Japan. Together, these Asian countries would expel Western imperialists and capitalists then share trade, resources and commodities between themselves.

In early 1940, troops of the Imperial Japanese Army (IJA) moved to seize southern Guangxi and Longzhou County, where the eastern branch of the Kunming–Hai Phong Railway reached the border at the Friendship Pass in Pingxiang. They also tried to move west to cut the rail line to Kunming. The railway from Indochina was the Chinese government's last secure overland link to the outside world.

On 10 May 1940, Germany invaded France. On 22 June, France signed an armistice with Germany (in effect from 25 June). On 10 July, the French parliament voted full powers to Marshal Philippe Pétain, effectively abrogating the Third Republic. Although much of metropolitan France came under German occupation, the French colonies remained under the direction of Pétain's government at Vichy. Resistance to Pétain and the armistice began even before it was signed, with Charles de Gaulle's appeal of 18 June. As a result, a de facto government-in-exile in opposition to Pétain, called Free France, was formed in London.

== Franco-Japanese negotiations ==
On 19 June, Japan took advantage of the defeat of France and the impending armistice to present the Governor-General of Indochina, Georges Catroux, with a request, in fact an ultimatum, demanding the closure of all supply routes to China and the admission of a 40-man Japanese inspection team under General Issaku Nishihara. The Americans became aware of the true nature of the Japanese "request" through intelligence intercepts since the Japanese had informed their German allies. Catroux initially responded by warning the Japanese that their unspecified "other measures" would be a breach of sovereignty. He was reluctant to acquiesce to the Japanese, but with his intelligence reporting that Japanese army and navy units were moving into threatening positions, the French government was not prepared for a protracted defense of the colony. Therefore, Catroux complied with the Japanese ultimatum on 20 June. Before the end of June the last train carrying munitions crossed the border bound for Kunming. Following this humiliation, Catroux was immediately replaced as governor-general by Admiral Jean Decoux. He did not return to France, however, but to London.

On 22 June, while Catroux was still in his post, the Japanese issued a second demand: naval basing rights at Guangzhouwan and the total closure of the Chinese border by 7 July. Issaku Nishihara, who was to lead the "inspection team", the true purpose of which was unknown, even to the Japanese, arrived in Hanoi on 29 June. On 3 July, he issued a third demand: air bases and the right to transit combat troops through Indochina. These new demands were referred to the government in France.

The incoming governor, Decoux, who arrived in Indochina in July, urged the government to reject the demands. Although he believed that Indochina could not defend itself against a Japanese invasion, Decoux believed it was strong enough to dissuade Japan from invading. At Vichy, General Jules-Antoine Bührer, chief of the Colonial General Staff, counselled resistance. The still neutral United States had already been contracted to provide aircraft, and there were 4,000 Tirailleurs sénégalais in Djibouti that could be shipped to Indochina in case of need. In Indochina, Decoux had under his command 32,000 regulars, plus 17,000 auxiliaries, although they were all ill-equipped.

On 30 August 1940, the Japanese foreign minister, Yōsuke Matsuoka, approved a draft proposal submitted by his French colleague, Paul Baudouin, (Note: Baudouin was a former general manager of the Banque de l'Indochine.) whereby Japanese forces could be stationed in and transit through Indochina only for the duration of the Sino-Japanese War. Both governments then "instructed their military representatives in Indochina to work out the details [although] they would have been better advised to stick to Tokyo–Vichy channels a bit longer". Negotiations between the supreme commander of Indochinese troops, Maurice Martin, and General Nishihara began at Hanoi on 3 September.

During negotiations, the government in France asked the German government to intervene to moderate its ally's demands. The Germans did nothing. Decoux and Martin, acting on their own, looked for help from the American and British consuls in Hanoi, and even consulted with the Chinese government on joint defence against a Japanese attack on Indochina.

On 6 September, an infantry battalion of the Japanese Twenty-Second Army based in Nanning violated the Indochinese border near the French fort at Đồng Đăng. The Twenty-Second Army was a part of the Japanese Southern China Area Army, whose officers, remembering the Mukden incident of 1931, were trying to force their superiors to adopt a more aggressive policy. Following the Đồng Đăng incident, Decoux cut off negotiations. On 18 September, Nishihara sent him an ultimatum, warning that Japanese troops would enter Indochina regardless of any French agreement at 22:00 (local time) on 22 September. This prompted Decoux to demand a reduction in the number of Japanese troops that would be stationed in Indochina. The Japanese Army General Staff, with the support of the Japanese Southern China Area Army, was demanding 25,000 troops in Indochina. Nishihara, with the support of the Imperial General Headquarters, got that number reduced to 6,000 on 21 September.

Seven and a half hours before the expiration of the Japanese ultimatum on 22 September, Martin and Nishihara signed an agreement authorizing the stationing of 6,000 Japanese troops in Tonkin north of the Red River, the use of four airfields in Tonkin, the right to move up to 25,000 troops through Tonkin to Yunnan and the right to move one division of the Twenty-Second Army through Tonkin via Haiphong for use elsewhere in China. Already on 5 September, the Japanese Southern Army had organized the amphibious Indochina Expeditionary Army under Major-General Takuma Nishimura, it was supported by a flotilla of ships and aircraft, both carrier- and land-based. When the accord was signed, a convoy was waiting off Hainan Island to bring the expeditionary force to Tonkin.

== Invasion ==
The accord had been communicated to all relevant commands by 21:00, an hour before the ultimatum was set to expire. It was understood between Martin and Nishimura that the first troops would arrive by ship. The Twenty-Second Army, however, did not intend to wait to take advantage of the accord. Lieutenant-General Aketo Nakamura, commander of the 5th (Infantry) Division, sent columns across the border near Đồng Đăng at precisely 22:00.

At Đồng Đăng there was an exchange of fire that quickly spread to other border posts overnight. The French position at the railhead at Lạng Sơn during the Battle of Lạng Sơn was surrounded by Japanese armour and forced to surrender on 25 September. Before surrendering, the French commanders had ordered the breechblocks of the 155mm cannons thrown into a river to prevent the Japanese from using them. During the Sino-French War of 1884–1885, the French had been forced into an embarrassing retreat from Lạng Sơn in which equipment had likewise been thrown into the same river to prevent capture. When the breechblocks of 1940 were eventually retrieved, several chests of money lost in 1885 were found also. Among the units taken captive at Lạng Sơn was the 2nd Battalion of the 5th Foreign Infantry Regiment that contained 179 German and Austrian volunteers, whom the Japanese in vain tried to induce to change sides.

On 23 September, the French Government protested the breach of the agreements by the IJA to the Japanese government. Around the same time, Vietnamese nationalists attempted to organize strikes along the Yunnan-Haiphong Railway but mostly failed.

On the morning of 24 September, Japanese aircraft from aircraft carriers in the Gulf of Tonkin attacked French positions on the coast. A French Government envoy came to negotiate; in the meantime, shore defenses remained under orders to open fire on any attempted landing.

On 26 September, Japanese forces came ashore at Dong Tac, south of Haiphong, and moved on the port. A second landing put tanks ashore, and Japanese planes bombed Haiphong, causing some casualties. By early afternoon the Japanese force of some 4,500 troops and a dozen tanks were outside Haiphong.

By the evening of 26 September, fighting had died down. Japan took possession of Gia Lam Airbase outside Hanoi, the rail marshaling yard on the Yunnan border at Lao Cai, and Phu Lang Thuong on the railway from Hanoi to Lạng Sơn, and stationed 900 troops in the port of Haiphong and 600 more in Hanoi.

== Aftermath ==
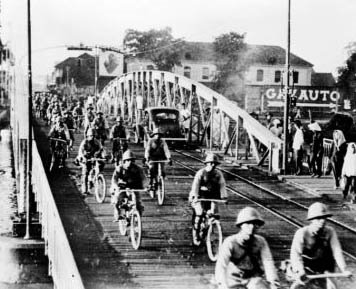
Japanese troops entering Saigon in 1941.

The Japanese tendered an official apology for the incident at Lạng Sơn on 5 October 1940. The Japanese-occupied towns were returned to French control and all French prisoners were released.

The occupation of southern French Indochina did not happen immediately. On 9 December 1940, an agreement was reached whereby French sovereignty over its army and administrative affairs was confirmed, while Japanese forces were free to fight the war against the Allies from Indochinese soil. The Vichy government had agreed that some 40,000 troops could be stationed there. However, Japanese planners did not immediately move troops there, worried that such a move would be inflammatory to relations between Japan, the United Kingdom, and the United States. Furthermore, within the Japanese high command there was a disagreement over what to do about the Soviet threat to the north of their Manchurian territories. The tipping point came just after the German invasion of the Soviet Union in late June 1941. With the Soviets tied down, the high command concluded that a "strike south" would solve Japan's problems with the United States, most notably the increasing American concerns about Japan's moves in China, and the possibility of a crippling oil embargo on Japan. To prepare for an invasion of the Dutch East Indies, some 140,000 Japanese troops invaded southern French Indochina on 28 July 1941. French troops and the civil administration were allowed to remain, albeit under Japanese supervision.

The Vietnamese perspective on the Japanese occupation of French Indochina was complex. On one hand, Japanese occupation led the Vietnamese people to think about rebellion against the Western powers controlling Southeast Asia. Japan was potentially an Asian power that might "liberate" them from European colonial rule. At the same time, Japanese occupation during wartime was also seen as harsh, and contributed to the Vietnamese famine of 1945. In May 1971, a document from senior North Vietnamese political figure Trường Chinh was published in English translation which denounced allegations that the Japanese were treated as liberators after assisting the removal of the French, even afterwards turning on the local Viet Minh resistance forces and committing atrocities. According to Chinh, "Militarily after suppressing the ability of the French to offer resistance, the Japanese pirates turned on the Viet Minh to entice them to cease guerilla attacks and cooperate with the Japanese. But all inducements of the Japanese army were rejected by the Viet Minh. The Japanese then went on the offensive to destroy our base areas. Wherever they went, the Japanese forces burned down homes, murdered law-abiding citizens, raped women, and stole possessions."

With the Allied invasion of France in 1944, Japan suspected that the French authorities in Indochina might assist Allied operations in the region. Therefore, Japan deposed the French authorities in the spring of 1945, imprisoning the French administrators and taking direct control of Indochina until the end of the war. At that point, Vietnamese nationalists under the Viet Minh banner took control in the August Revolution, and issued a Proclamation of Independence of the Democratic Republic of Vietnam. The Japanese occupation of Indochina helped strengthen the Viet Minh and contributed to the outbreak of the First Indochina War in 1946 against French rule.

== See also ==
- Collaboration with the Empire of Japan

== Bibliography ==
- Boissarie, Delphine (2015). "Indochina during World War II: An Economy under Japanese Control". In Boldorf, Marcel; Okazaki, Tetsuji (eds.). Economies under Occupation: The Hegemony of Nazi Germany and Imperial Japan in World War II. Routledge. pp. 232–244. ISBN 978-1-317-50650-8.
- Dreifort, John E. (1982). "Japan's Advance into Indochina, 1940: The French Response". Journal of Southeast Asian Studies. 13 (2). Cambridge University Press: 279–295. doi:10.1017/S0022463400008705. JSTOR 20070499. S2CID 162702460.
- Ehrengardt, Christian-Jacques (2003). "Ciel de feu en Indochine, 1939–1945" [Sky of Fire in Indochina, 1939–1945]. Aéro Journal (in French). No. 29. pp. 4–26.
- Gunn, Geoffrey C. (2014). Rice Wars in Colonial Vietnam: The Great Famine and the Viet Minh Road to Power. Rowman and Littlefield. ISBN 978-1-4422-2302-8.
- Hata, Ikuhiko (1980). "The Army's Move into Northern Indochina". In Morley, James W. (ed.). The Fateful Choice: Japan's Advance into Southeast Asia, 1939–1941. New York: Columbia University Press. pp. 155–163.
- Long-hsuen, Hsu; Ming-kai, Chang (1971). History of the Sino-Japanese War (1937–1945). Translated by Ha-hsiung, Wen (2nd ed.). Taipei: Chung Wu Publishing.
- Jennings, Eric (2004). Vichy in the Tropics: Pétain's National Revolution in Madagascar, Guadeloupe, and Indochina, 1940-1944. Stanford: Stanford University Press. ISBN 978-0-8047-5047-9.
- Marr, David G. (1995). Vietnam, 1945: The Quest for Power. Berkeley: University of California Press. ISBN 978-0-520-92039-2.
- Michelin, Franck (2017). "The Pacific War started in Indochina: the Occupation of French Indochina and the Route to Pearl Harbor". Vietnam-Indochina-Japan's relation during the Second World War Document and Interpretation. Waseda University Institute of Asia-Pacific Studies. pp. 54–59. ISBN 978-4-902590-71-5.
- Murakami, Sachiko (1981). Japan's Thrust into French Indochina, 1940–1945 (PhD). New York University.
- Murakami, Sachiko (1990). "Indochina: Unplanned Incursion". In Conroy, Hilary; Wray, Harry (eds.). Pearl Harbor Re-examined: Prologue to the Pacific War. University of Hawaii Press. pp. 141–150. ISBN 978-0-8248-1235-5.
- Porch, Douglas (2010). The French Foreign Legion: A Complete History of the Legendary Fighting Force. Skyhorse. ISBN 978-1-62873-239-9.
- Tarling, Nicholas (1990). "The British and the First Japanese Move into Indo-China". Journal of Southeast Asian Studies. 21 (1). Cambridge University Press: 35–65. doi:10.1017/S0022463400001958. JSTOR 20071130. S2CID 162746113.
- Yoshizawa, Minami (1992). "The Nishihara Mission in Hanoi, July 1940". In Takeshi, Shiraishi; Motoo, Furuta (eds.). Indochina in the 1940s and 1950s. Ithaca, N.Y.: Cornell University Press. pp. 9–54. ISBN 978-1-5017-1916-5.
