= Japanese South China Area Army =

- Active: February 9, 1940-June 26, 1941
- Country: Empire of Japan
- Branch: Imperial Japanese Army
- Type: Infantry
- Role: Area Army
- Garrison/HQ: Canton
- Nicknames: Nami (波, Wave)

The Japanese South China Area Army (南支那方面軍, Minami Shina hōmen gun) was an area army of the Imperial Japanese Army during Second Sino-Japanese War.

== History ==
The Japanese South China Area Army was formed on February 9, 1940, under the control of the China Expeditionary Army. It was transferred to direct control by the Imperial General Headquarters on July 23, 1940. Headquartered in Canton, it was responsible for direction of the Japanese invasion of southern China, garrisoning Japanese-occupied Guangdong Province and controlling military operations in neighboring Guangxi Province. It was disbanded on June 26, 1941, and its component units were reassigned back to the China Expeditionary Army.

On March 9, the 106th Division was recalled to Japan for demobilization from Central China. It was disbanded in Central China in April 1940 never having reached South China.

== List of Commanders ==
=== Commanding officer ===
	Name	From	To
1	Lieutenant General Rikichi Ando	10 February 1940	5 October 1940
2	Lieutenant General Jun Ushiroku	5 October 1940	26 June 1941

=== Chief of Staff ===
	Name	From	To
1	Major General Hiroshi Nemoto	10 February 1940	1 March 1941
2	Major General Rimpei Katō	1 March 1941	28 June 1941
